= Hungarian rail border crossings =

These are all Hungarian rail border crossings as of 2022. Crossings in bold have passenger traffic. Crossings in italics are abandoned. The year of opening is in brackets.

== Hungary - Slovakia ==
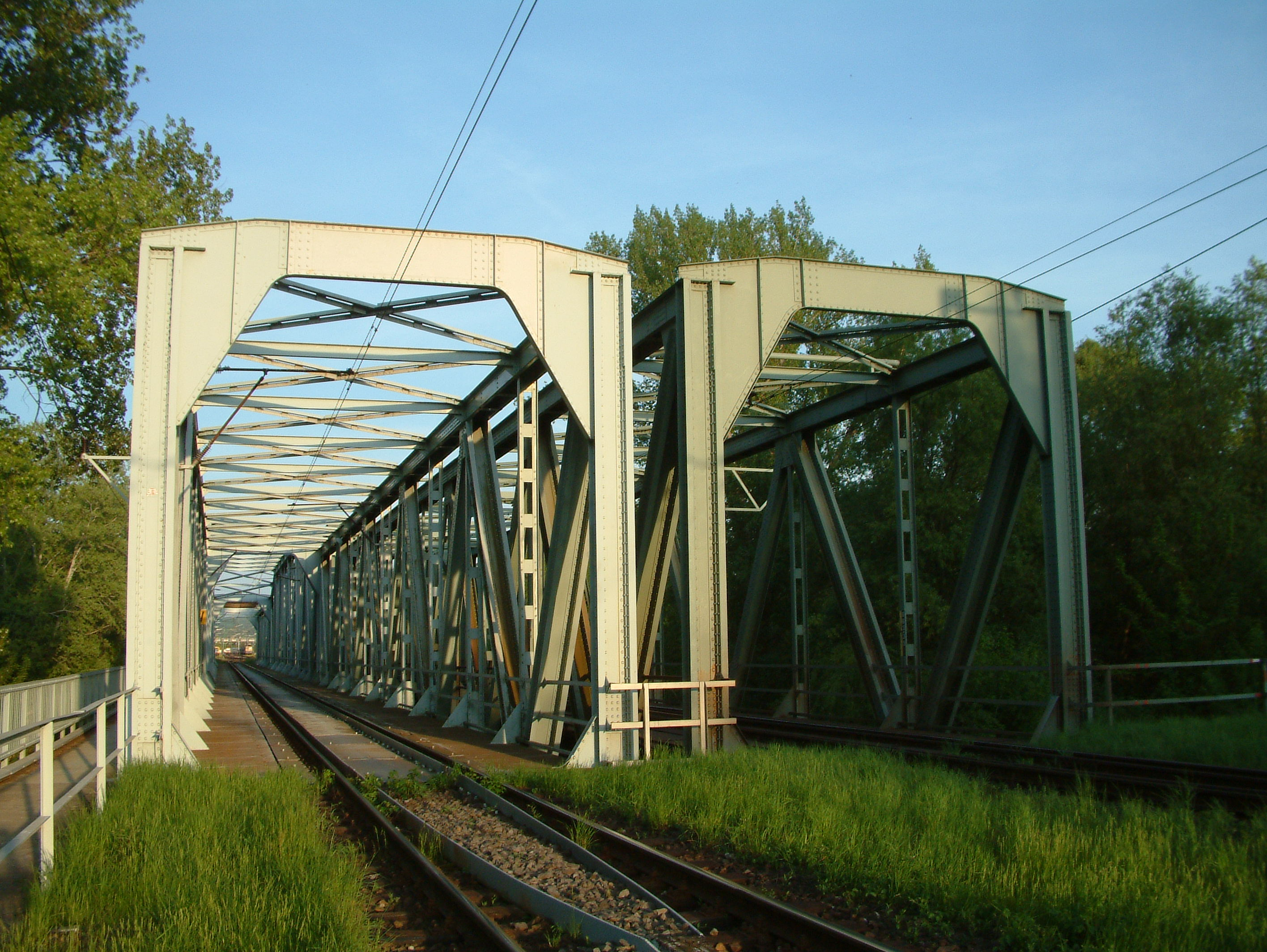
Bridge over Ipoly River

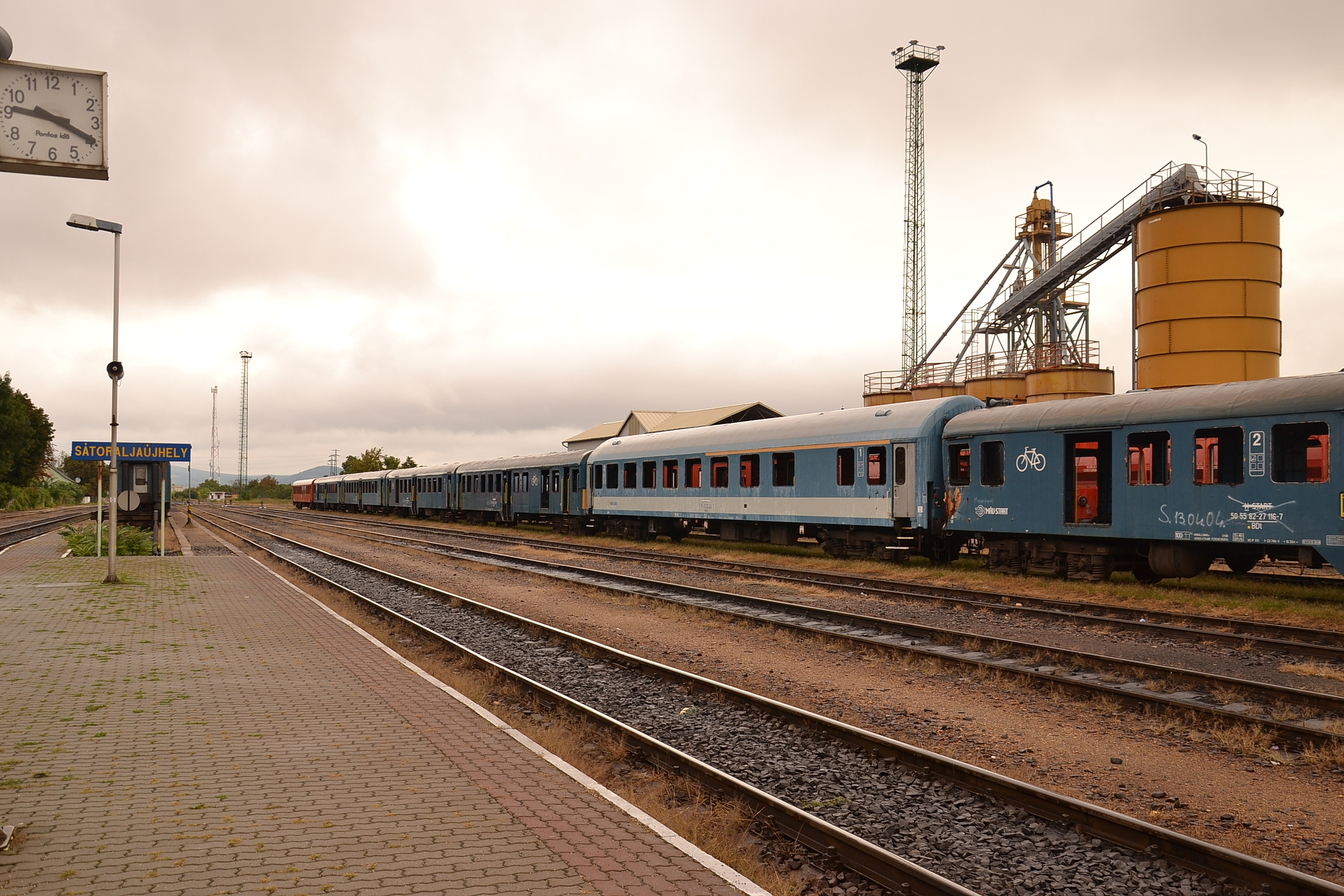
Sátoraljaújhely

As of 2023, 9 border crossings are operating, 3 of which have passenger traffic.

Note that all of these railway lines were built in Austria-Hungary and became border crossings after the Treaty of Trianon in 1920. Some railway lines were dismantled as the borders cut them, so they didn't function as border crossings.

- **Rajka - Rusovce (1891)**
- Komárom - Komárno (1910), freight trains only, no passenger traffic since 14 December 2008
- **Szob - Chľaba (1850)**
- Nagybörzsöny - Pastovce (1885-1918, Narrow gauge)
- Hont - Šahy (1886-1945) (track dismantled)
- Ipolytarnóc - Kalonda, freight trains only, no passenger traffic since 2 February 2003
- Nógrádszakál - Bušince, freight trains only, no passenger traffic since 2 August 1992
- Somoskőújfalu - Fiľakovo (1871), freight trains only, no passenger traffic since 1 May 2011
- Bánréve - Lenartovce (1873), freight trains only, no passenger traffic since 12 December 2009
- Bánréve - Abovce (1874-1920), track dismantled
- Tornanádaska - Turňa nad Bodvou (1890) (track out of use, no traffic)
- **Hidasnémeti - Kechnec (1860)**
- Sátoraljaújhely - Slovenské Nové Mesto (1872), freight trains only, no passenger traffic
- Zemplénagárd - Pribeník (Canceled, Narrow gauge)

== Hungary - Ukraine ==
- **Záhony - Chop (1873)** dual gauge 1435/1520 mm
- Eperjeske - Solovka (freight only) dual gauge 1435/1520 mm

== Hungary - Romania ==
As of 2023, 5 border crossings are operating, all of which have passenger traffic.

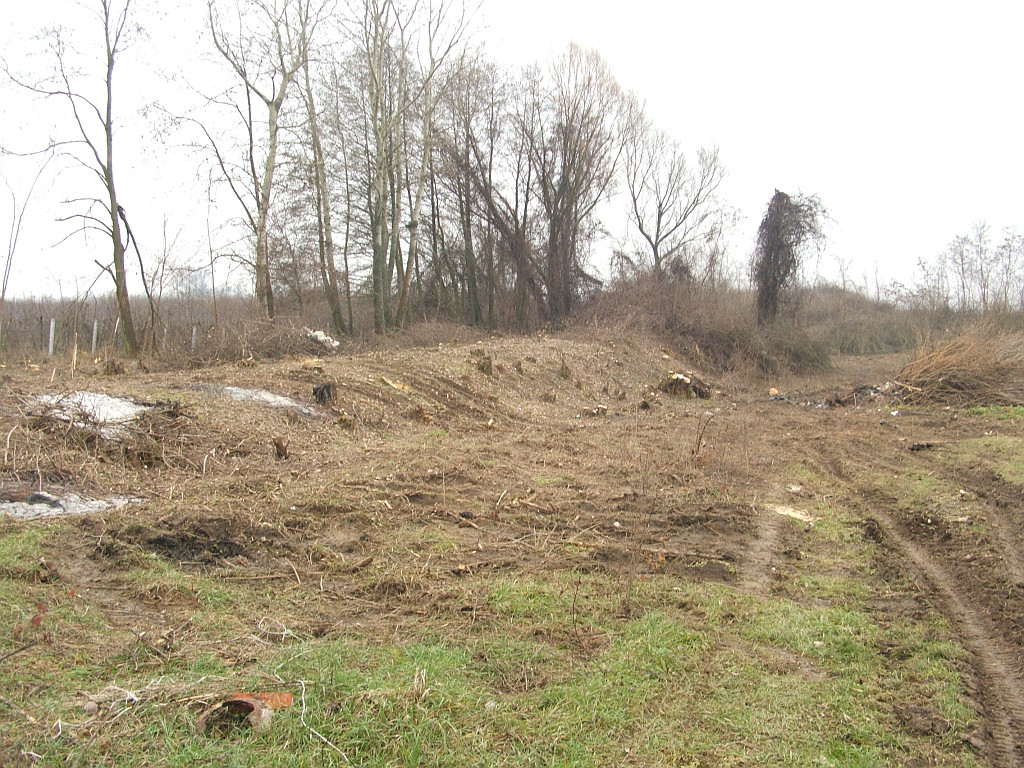
Abandoned track near Zajta

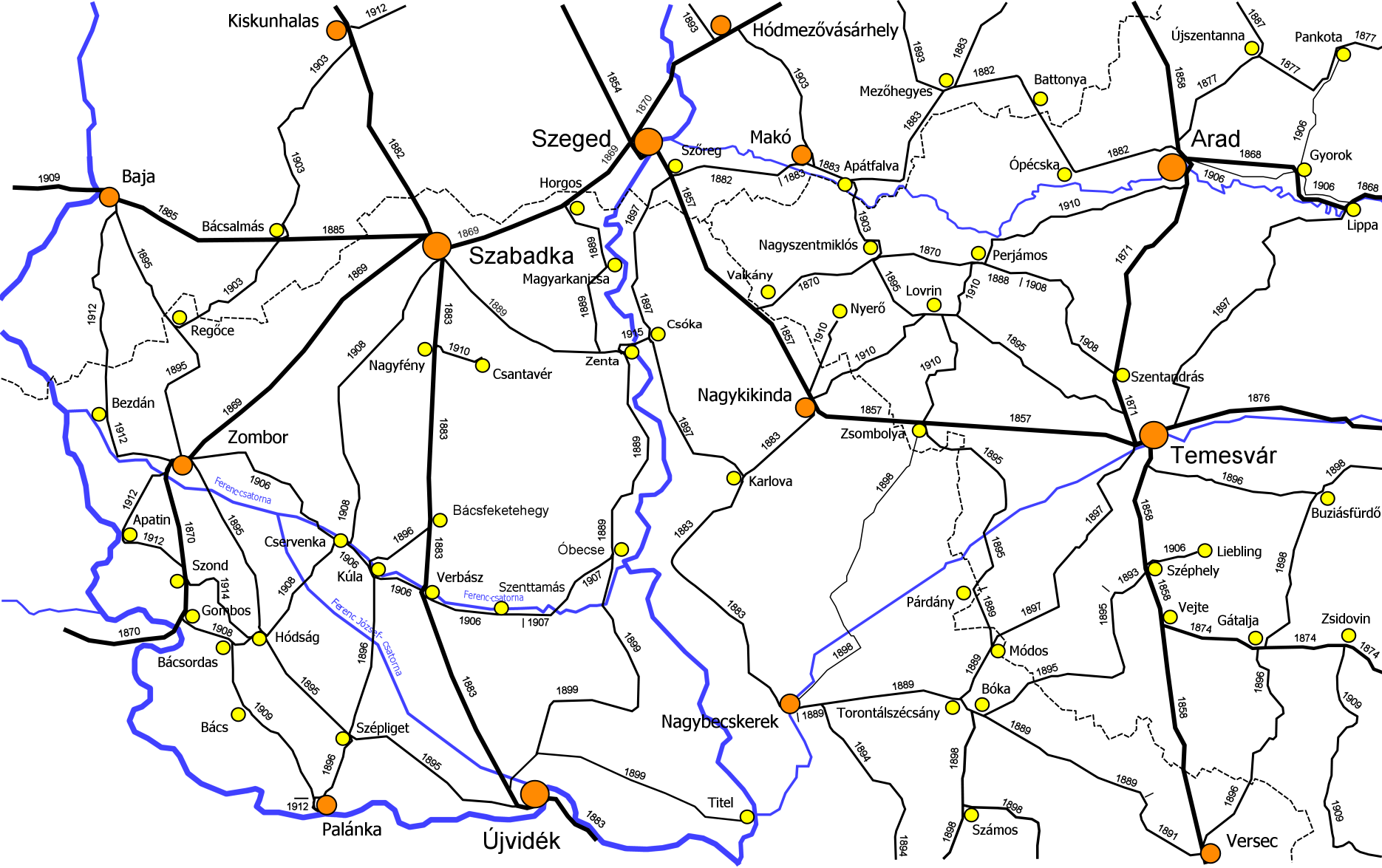
Railway lines in Bácska and Banat (1920)

Note that all of these railway lines were built in Austria-Hungary and became border crossings after the Treaty of Trianon in 1920.

- Zajta - Peleș (1898-1920, 1940-1945) (track dismantled)
- Csenger - Oar (1908-1920, 1940-1944) (track dismantled)
- Tiborszállás - Carei (1905)
- **Nyírábrány - Valea lui Mihai (1871)**
- Nagykereki - Santăul Mare (1911-1920, 1940-1945) (track dismantled)
- **Biharkeresztes - Episcopia Bihor (1858)**
- Körösnagyharsány - Cheresig (1887-1920, 1940-1944) (track dismantled)
- **Kötegyán - Salonta (1871)**
- Kötegyán - Ciumeghiu (1899-1920) (track dismantled)
- Elek - Grăniceri (1884-1920) (track dismantled)
- **Lőkösháza - Curtici (1858)**
- Battonya - Pecica (1882-1920) (track dismantled)
- Apátfalva - Cenad (1903-1920) (track dismantled)

== Hungary - Serbia ==
As of 2023, only one border crossing is operating.

Note that all of these railway lines were built in Austria-Hungary and became border crossings after the Treaty of Trianon in 1920.

- Szőreg - Rabe (1857-1920) (track dismantled), see Szeged-Temesvár railway
- Vedresháza - Đala (1897-1946) (track dismantled)
- **Röszke - Horgoš (1869)**, passenger traffic reopened on 28 November 2023
- Kelebia - Subotica (1882), see Budapest–Belgrade railway (no traffic until 2025 due to reconstruction works)
- Csikéria - Subotica (1885-1944) (track dismantled)
- Ólegyen - Riđica (1903-1944) (track dismantled)
- Gara - Riđica (1895-1944) (track dismantled)
- Hercegszántó - Bački Breg (1912-1944) (track dismantled)

== Hungary - Croatia ==
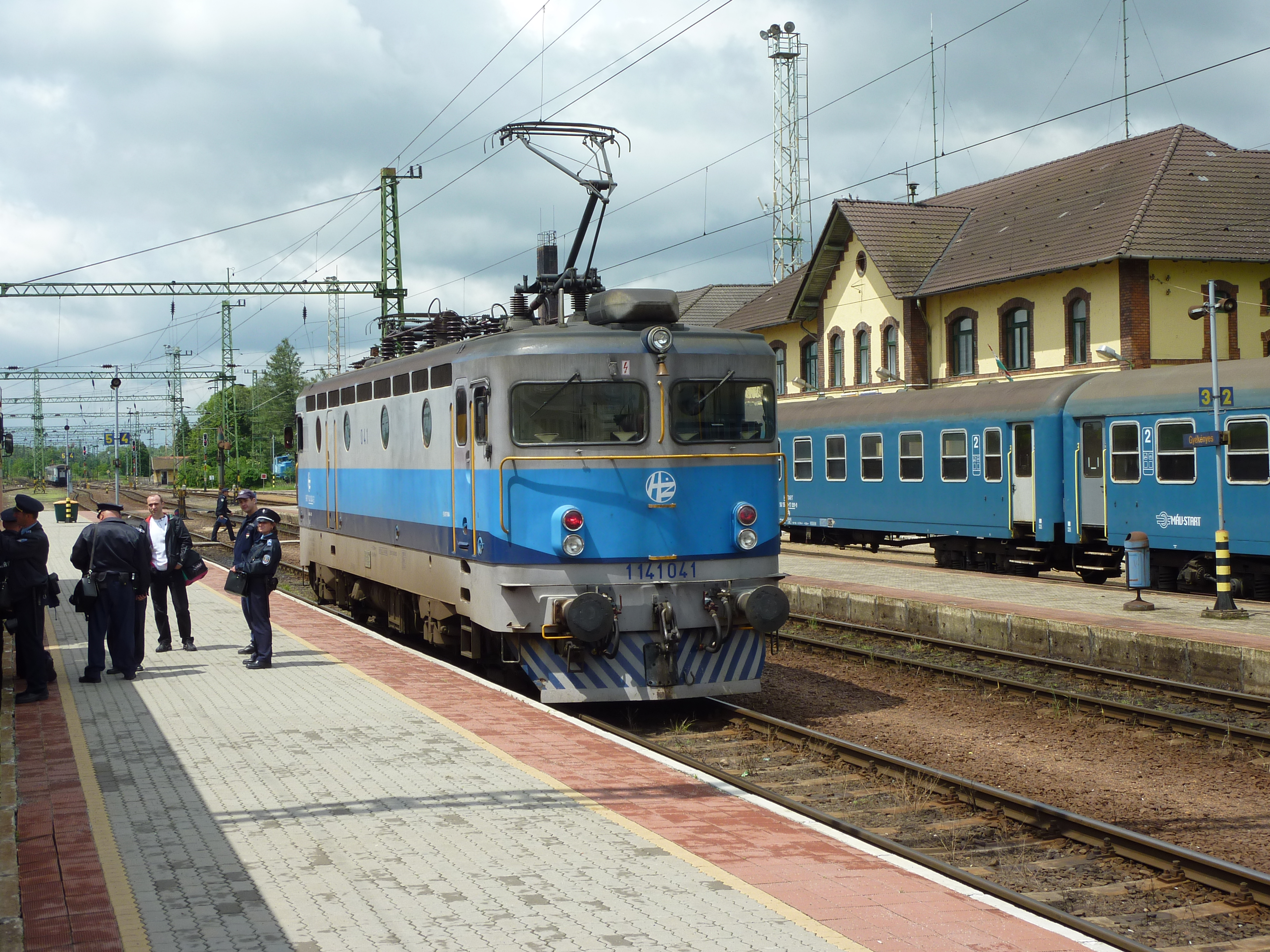
Gyékényes

Note that all of these railway lines were built in Austria-Hungary and became border crossings after the Treaty of Trianon in 1920.

- **Magyarbóly - Beli Manastir (1870)**
- Beremend - Baranjsko Petrovo Selo (track dismantled)
- Drávaszabolcs - Donji Miholjac (track dismantled)
- Drávasztára-Zaláta - Noskovci (track dismantled)
- Barcs - Virovitica (1885- 1968) (track dismantled)
- **Gyékényes - Botovo (1862)**
- Murakeresztúr - Kotoriba (1860), freight trains only, no passenger traffic

== Hungary - Slovenia ==
- Rédics - Lendava (track dismantled)
- **Bajánsenye - Hodoš (2000)** (old railway: 1907–1945, rebuilt in 2000 on a new alignment)

== Hungary - Austria ==
As of 2023, 6 border crossings are operating, all of which have passenger traffic.

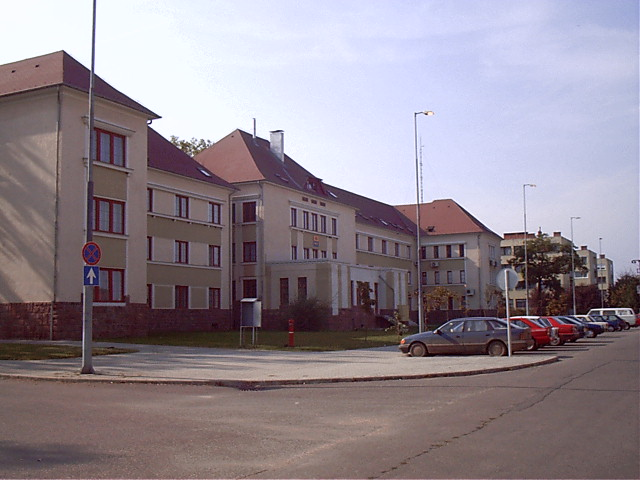
Hegyeshalom

Note that all of these railway lines were built in Austria-Hungary and became border crossings after the Treaty of Trianon in 1920.

- **Szentgotthárd - Mogersdorf (1872)**
- Kőszeg - Rattersdorf-Liebing (1908-1960) (track dismantled)
- Répcevis - Lutzmannsburg (track dismantled)
- **Szentgotthárd - Deutschkreutz (1908)**
- Pinkamindszent – Strem (track dismantled)
- **Ágfalva - Loipersbach-Schattendorf (1847)**, see Sopron–Wiener Neustadt railway
- **Sopron - Baumgarten**
- **Fertőszentmiklós - Pamhagen (1897)**
- **Hegyeshalom - Nickelsdorf (1855)**

== See also ==
- Polish rail border crossings
- Czech rail border crossings
- Slovak rail border crossings
- Hungarian State Railways
