= Slovak rail border crossings =

List of railway crossings in and out of Slovakia

Slovak rail border crossings, as of 2007. Crossings in italic are abandoned. Year of opening in brackets.

== Slovakia – Czech Republic ==
Note that all those railway lines were built before dissolution of Czechoslovakia in 1993 and became border in that year

- Kúty – Lanžhot (1900)
- Holíč nad Moravou – Hodonín (1891), currently no regular passenger traffic
- Skalica na Slovensku – Sudoměřice – (1893), currently no regular passenger traffic
- Vrbovce – Velká nad Veličkou (1929)
- Horné Srnie – Vlárský průsmyk (1888)
- Lúky pod Makytou – Horní Lideč (1937)
- Čadca – Mosty u Jablunkova (1871)

== Slovakia – Poland ==
- Skalité – Zwardoń (1884)
- Suchá Hora – Podczerwone (1899–1975)
- Plaveč – Muszyna (1876), no passenger trains, only RegionalExpress trains from Poprad
- Medzilaborce – Łupków (1874), see also Łupków Pass

== Slovakia – Ukraine ==
- Maťovce – Uzhhorod, freight transport only, see Uzhhorod - Košice broad gauge track (1966)
- Čierna nad Tisou – Chop (1872)

== Slovakia – Hungary ==
- Rusovce – Rajka (1891)
- Komárno – Komárom (1910) (Freight Trains only, no passenger traffic since 14 December 2008)
- Chľaba – Szob (1850)
- Pastovce – Nagybörzsöny (1885–1918, Narrow gauge)
- Šahy – Hont (1886–1945) (track dismantled)
- Kalonda – Ipolytarnóc (Freight Trains only, no passenger traffic since 2 February 2003)
- Nógrádszakál – Bušince (Freight Trains only, no passenger traffic since 2 August 1992)
- Fiľakovo – Somoskőújfalu (1871), freight trains only, no passenger traffic since 1 May 2011
- Lenartovce – Bánréve (1873), freight trains only, no passenger traffic since 12 December 2009
- Turňa nad Bodvou – Tornanádaska (1890) (track out of use, no traffic)
- Kechnec – Hidasnémeti (1860)
- Slovenské Nové Mesto – Sátoraljaújhely (1872), (Freight Trains only, no passenger traffic)
- Pribeník – Zemplénagárd (Canceled, Narrow gauge)

== Slovakia – Austria ==
- Bratislava-Petržalka – Kittsee (1897–1945, line re-opened in 1998)
- Bratislava-Petržalka – Berg – Wolfsthal (1911–1945)
- Devínska Nová Ves – Marchegg (1848)

== See also ==
- Polish rail border crossings
- Czech rail border crossings
- Hungarian rail border crossings
