= Hungary–Slovakia border =

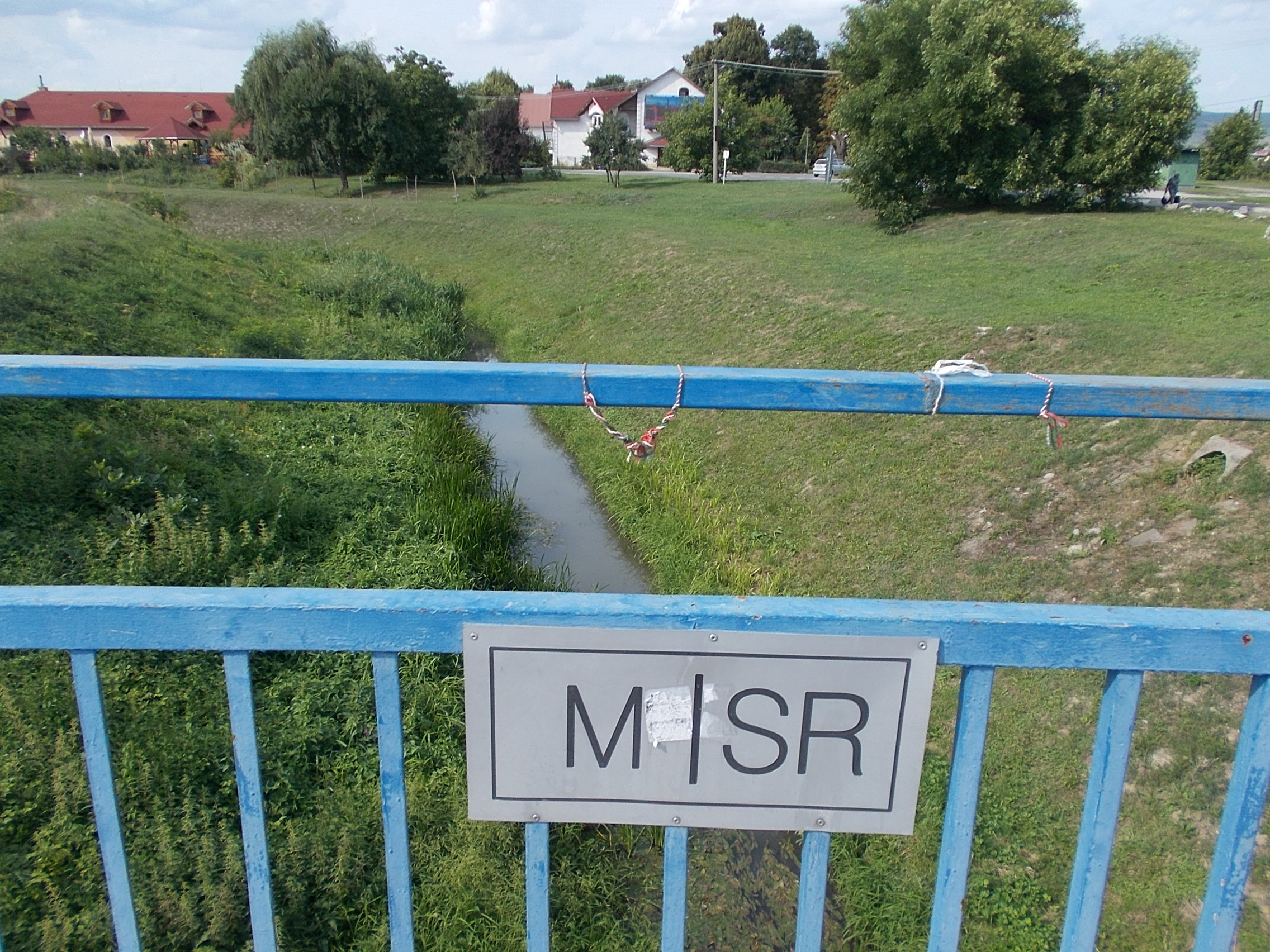
- Bridge over Ronyva/Roňava near Sátoraljaújhely

Characteristics
- Entities: Hungary Slovakia
- Length: 679 km (422 mi)

History
- Established: 1920; Signing of the Treaty of Trianon at the end of the World War I
- Current shape: 1947; Paris Peace Treaties
- Treaties: Treaty of Trianon (1920); Second Vienna Award (1940); Paris Peace Treaties (1947)

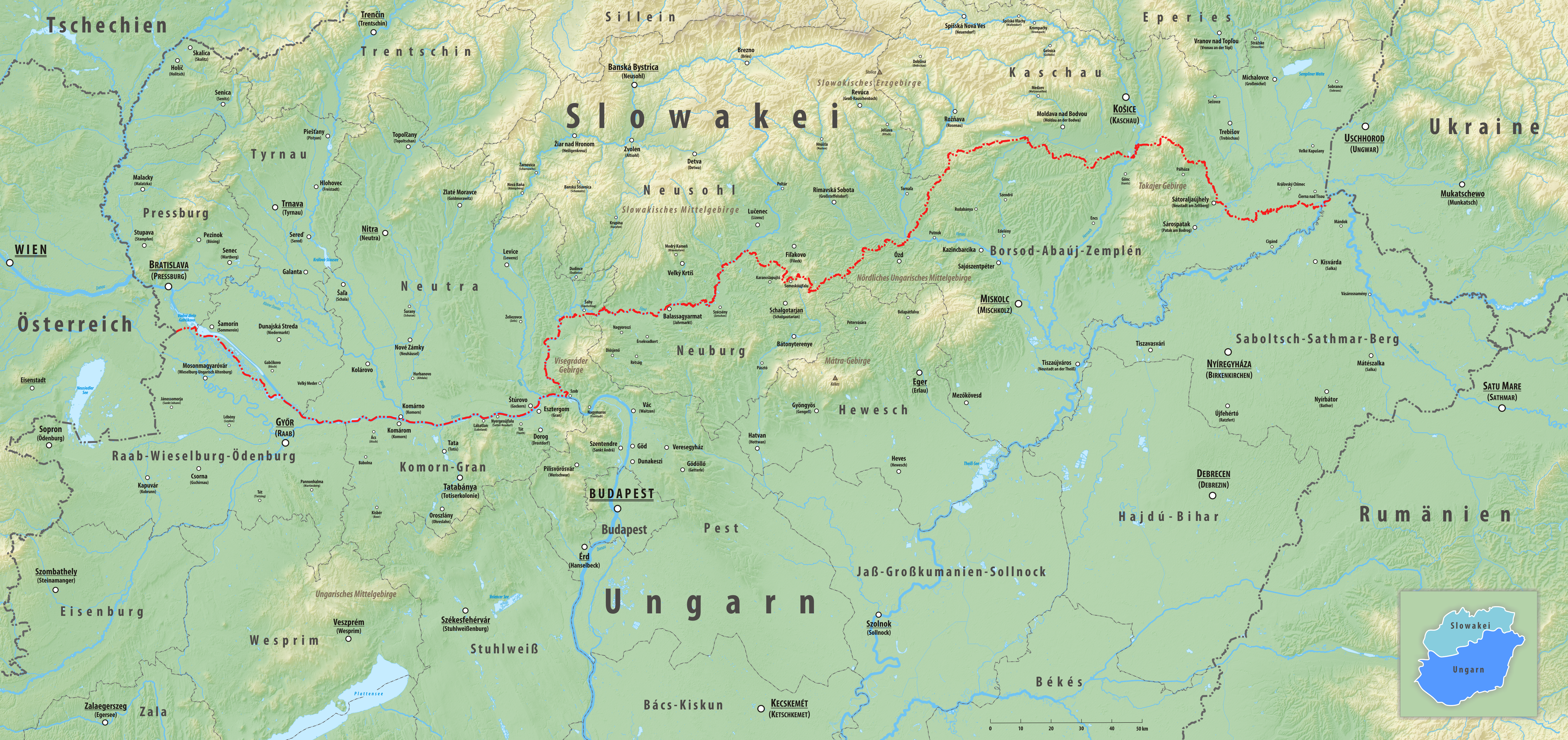
Hungarian–Slovak border (red)

The international border between Hungary and Slovakia forms a 679 kilometres (422 mi) arc extending from the tripoint with Austria at the west to the tripoint with Ukraine at the east.

== Counties and regions along the border ==
=== Hungary ===
Six Hungarian Counties have borders with Slovakia. These are the following:

- Győr–Moson–Sopron
- Komárom-Esztergom
- Pest
- Nógrád
- Borsod–Abaúj–Zemplén
- Szabolcs–Szatmár–Bereg

=== Slovakia ===
Five Slovak regions have borders with Hungary. These are the following:

- Bratislava
- Trnava
- Nitra
- Banská Bystrica
- Košice

== Border crossings ==
Hungarian and Slovak boundary markers

=== Road ===
Both countries are part of the Schengen Area and the European Union, so there are minimal or non-existent border controls.

Hungary checkpoint	(Slovakia) Slovak checkpoint	Opened	Type of road	Route in Hungary	Route in Slovakia	Notes
Rajka	Čunovo	1998	highway	M15	D2	Part of E65 / E75
Rajka	Čunovo		main road	15	I/2	
Rajka	Čunovo		local road	1409		
Lipót	Gabčíkovo	26 July 2013	ferry		1414	
Vámosszabadi	Medveďov	1973	main road	14	I/13	Part of E575; Vámosszabadi Bridge over the Danube
Komárom	Komárno	17 September 2020	main road	13		Monostori Bridge
Komárom	Komárno	1946	main road	132	I/64	Elisabeth Bridge
Neszmély	Radvaň nad Dunajom	29 June 2023	ferry			
Lábatlan (Piszke)	Kravany nad Dunajom	2013	ferry			
Esztergom	Štúrovo	2016	freight ferry			
Esztergom	Štúrovo	2001	main/local road	11326	I/63	Mária Valéria Bridge, vehicle only <3,5t
Ipolydamásd	Chľaba	28 July 2023	local road		1515	Károly Róbert Bridge over the Ipeľ
Letkés	Salka	1994	local road	12111	1518	vehicle only <3,5t
Vámosmikola	Pastovce	planned	local road	12113	1569	with the planned Bridge
Tésa	Vyškovce nad Ipľom		local road	12114	1583	vehicle only <3,5t
Hont (Parassapuszta)	Šahy (Homok)		main road	2	I/66	Part of E77
Hont (Parassapuszta)	Šahy (Homok)	planned	highway	M2	R3	planned in the future
Drégelypalánk	Chľaba	12 January 2024	local road	2208		Saint Borbála Bridge
Balassagyarmat	Slovenské Ďarmoty	1998	main road	222	II/527A	
Őrhalom	Vrbovka	1 December 2023	local road	2209	2610	Szent-Iványi Bridge over the Ipeľ
Szécsény (Pösténypuszta)	Kováčovce (Peťov)	24 February 2012	local road	22105	2616	Katalin Bridge
Nógrádszakál (Ráróspuszta)	Trenč	7 December 2011	local road	22103	2679	Madách Bridge
Ipolytarnóc	Kalonda		local/main road	2205	II/594	vehicle only <3,5t
Somoskőújfalu	Šiatorská Bukovinka		main road	21	I/71	
Cered	Tachty	2007	local road	23119	2783	vehicle only <3,5t
Bánréve	Lenartovce	2007	local road		2807	vehicle only <3,5t
Bánréve	Lenartovce		main road	26	I/67	vehicle only <3,5t
Aggtelek	Domica Cave		local/main road	26104	II/587	vehicle only <3,5t
Tornanádaska	Hosťovce		main/local road	27	3299	vehicle only <3,5t
Hídvégardó	Hosťovce	2007	local road	2614	3300	vehicle only <3,5t
Szemere	Buzica	2007	local road	2626	3400	vehicle only <3,5t
Tornyosnémeti	Milhosť	2018	motorway	M30	R4	Part of E71
Tornyosnémeti	Milhosť		main road	3	I/17	
Abaújvár	Kechnec (Vrbyny)	2015	local road			
Kéked	Trstené pri Hornáde	2011	local road	3709	3342	
Hollóháza	Skároš	2011	local road	37124	3400	
Sátoraljaújhely	Slovenské Nové Mesto		main road	37	I/79A	
Sátoraljaújhely	Slovenské Nové Mesto	2011	local road	Rákóczi út	3683	Bereczki Bridge over Rozsnyó, vehicle only <3,5t
Karos	Streda nad Bodrogom	2007	local road		3686	
Pácin	Veľký Kamenec	1995	local road	38304	3689	vehicle only <3,5t
Nagyrozvágy	Veľký Horeš	26 September 2023	local road	38122	38112	
Lácacséke	Pribeník	2011	local road			vehicle only <3,5t
Zemplénagárd	Veľké Trakany	2013	local road	38124		vehicle only <3,5t

=== Rail ===
All railway crossings are standard gauge. As of September 2026, three railway crossings have active, passenger traffic.

- Rajka – Rusovce; electrified 25 kV 50 Hz, single-track line for cargo and passenger services
- Komárom – Komárno; last train: 11 December 2004, electrified 25 kV 50 Hz
- Szob – Chľaba; electrified 25 kV 50 Hz, double-track line
- Ipolytarnóc – Kalonda; inactive
  - Nógrádszakál – Bušince; inactive
- Somoskőújfalu – Šiatorská Bukovinka; last train: 3 April 2011
- Bánréve – Lenartovce; last train: 13 December 2008
- Hidasnémeti – Čaňa; electrified 25 kV 50 Hz
- Sátoraljaújhely – Slovenské Nové Mesto; last train: 13 December 2008

== See also ==
- Hungary–Slovakia relations
