= Polish rail border crossings =

Polish rail border crossings as of 2007, abolished cross-border lines are in italic. Year of opening in brackets.

== Poland - Russia ==
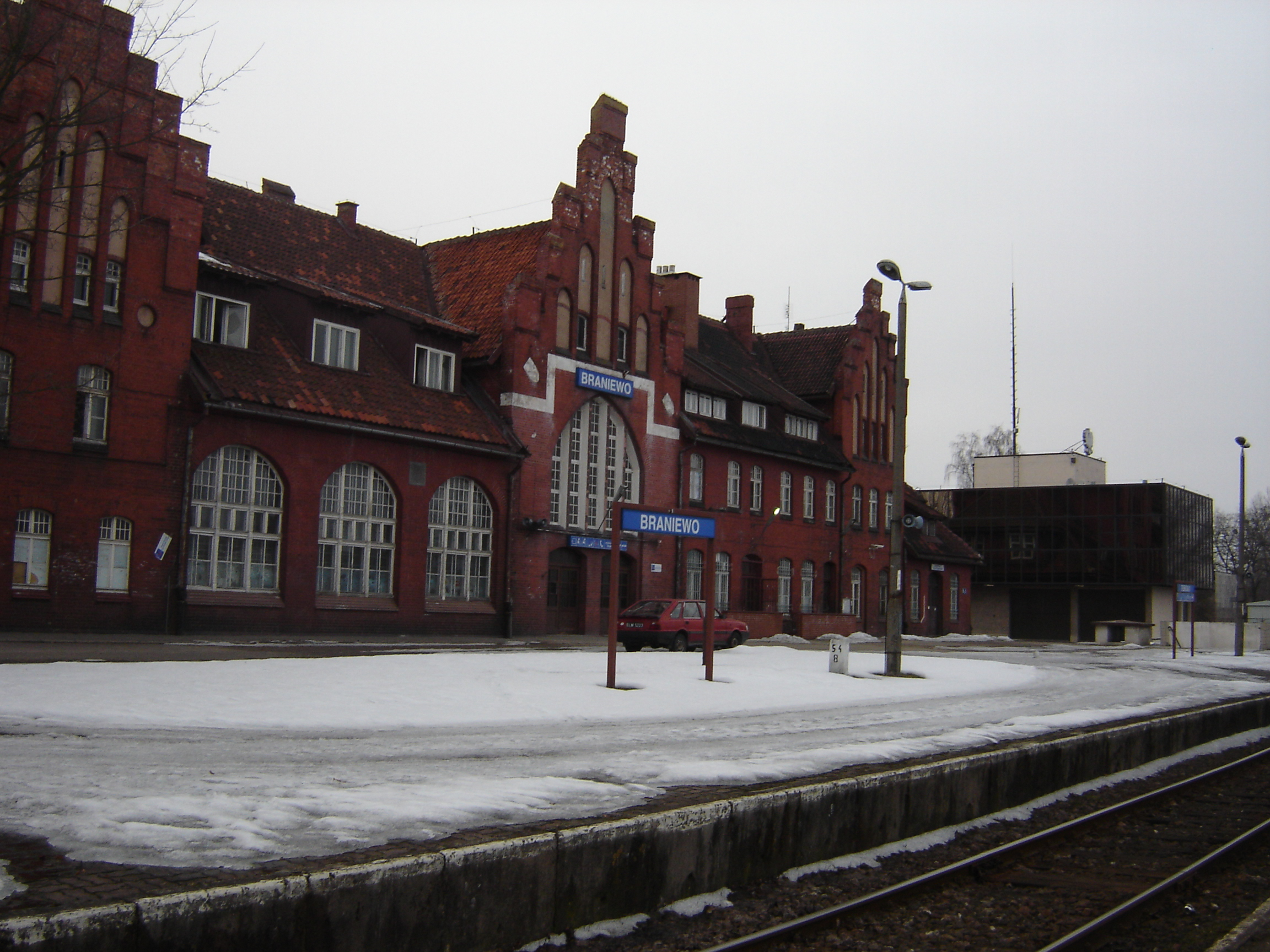
Railway station Braniewo

- Braniewo - Mamonovo (1853)
- Głomno - Bagrationovsk (1866)
- Skandawa - Zheleznodorozhny (1871)

== Poland - Lithuania ==
- Trakiszki - Mockava

== Poland - Belarus ==
- Kuźnica − Bruzgi Border Crossing - Highway
- Kuźnica − Grodno Border Crossing - Passenger & Freight Railway on the Saint Petersburg–Warsaw Railway
- Zubki - Bierestovica
- Siemianówka - Svislach
- Czeremcha - Visoko-Litovsk
- Terespol - Brest
- Wola Uhruska - Tomashovka

== Poland - Ukraine ==
- Dorohusk - Jahodyn (Yahodyn)
- Hrubieszów - Volodymyr-Volynskyi, see Linia Hutnicza Szerokotorowa
- Hrebenne - Rava-Ruska
- Werchrata - Rava-Ruska
- Przemyśl - Mostyska
- Malhowice - Nyzhankovychi
- Krościenko - Khyriv

== Poland - Slovakia ==
- Łupków - Medzilaborce (1874), see also Łupków Pass
- Muszyna - Plaveč (1876)
- Podczerwone - Suchá Hora (1899 - 1975)
- Zwardoń - Skalité (1884)

== Poland - Czech Republic ==
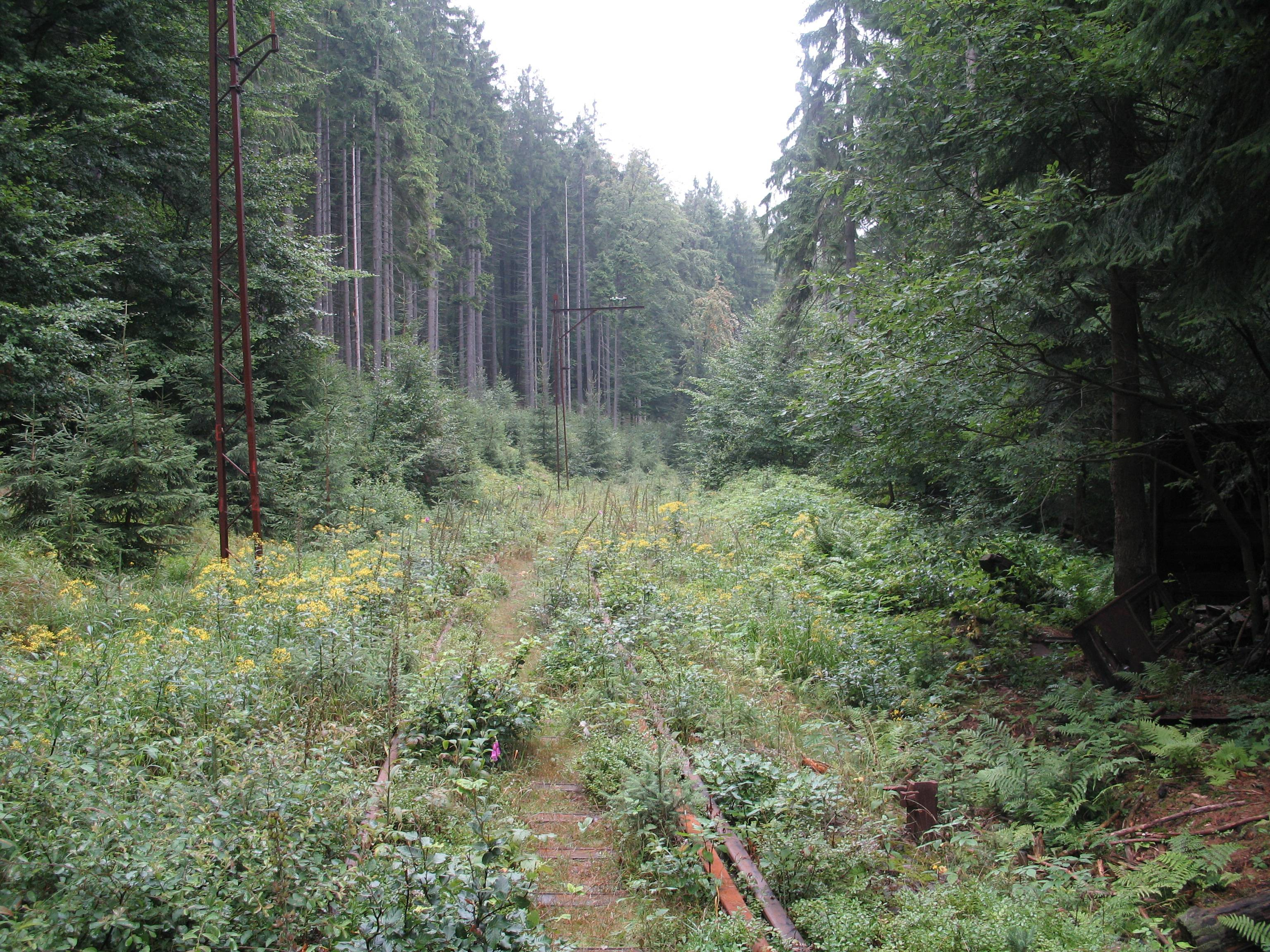
Abandoned Harrachov-Jakuszyce section of Izera railway in 2006, re-opened for traffic in 2010

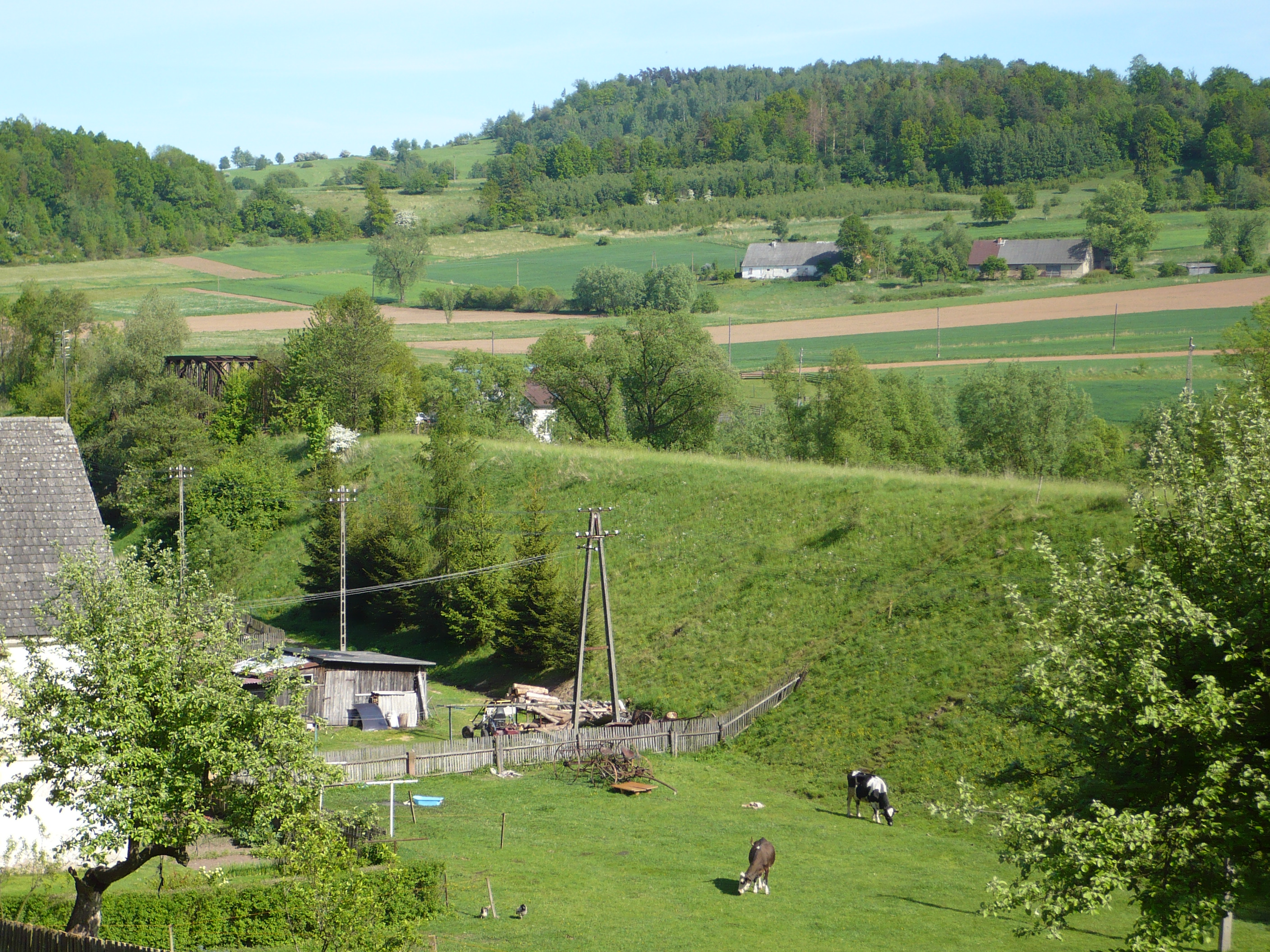
Abandoned railway bridge across Ścinawka at Tłumaczów (2009)

- Cieszyn - Český Těšín (1888)
- Marklowice - Albrechtice (1914-1931), abolished after enactment of border with Czechoslovakia, only base of bridge across Olza remained
- Zebrzydowice - Petrovice u Karviné (1855)
- Chałupki (Annaberg) - Bohumín (1848), see Emperor Ferdinand North Railway
- Krzanowice - Chuchelná (1895-1945)
- Pilszcz - Opava (1904-1945)
- Głubczyce - Krnov (1873-1945)
- Głuchołazy - Jindřichov ve Slezsku (1875)
- Głuchołazy - Mikulovice (1888)
- Kałków - Vidnava (1911-1945)
- Dziewiętlice - Bernartice (1896-1945)
- Międzylesie - Lichkov (1875)
- Kudowa-Zdrój - Náchod (1945 only)
- Tłumaczów - Otovice (1889-1945)
- Mieroszów - Meziměstí (1877)
- Lubawka - Královec (1869), freight only
- Jakuszyce - Harrachov (1902-1946, 2010-present), see Izera railway
- Mirsk - Jindřichovice pod Smrkem (1902-1945)
- Zawidów - Frýdlant v Čechách (1875), freight only
- Bogatynia - Heřmanice (1900-1945), narrow gauge, see Frýdlant-Heřmanice Railway
- Kopaczów (Oberullersdorf) - Hrádek nad Nisou (Grottau) (1859-1945), trains currently do not stop on the Polish territory, peage only

== Poland - Germany ==
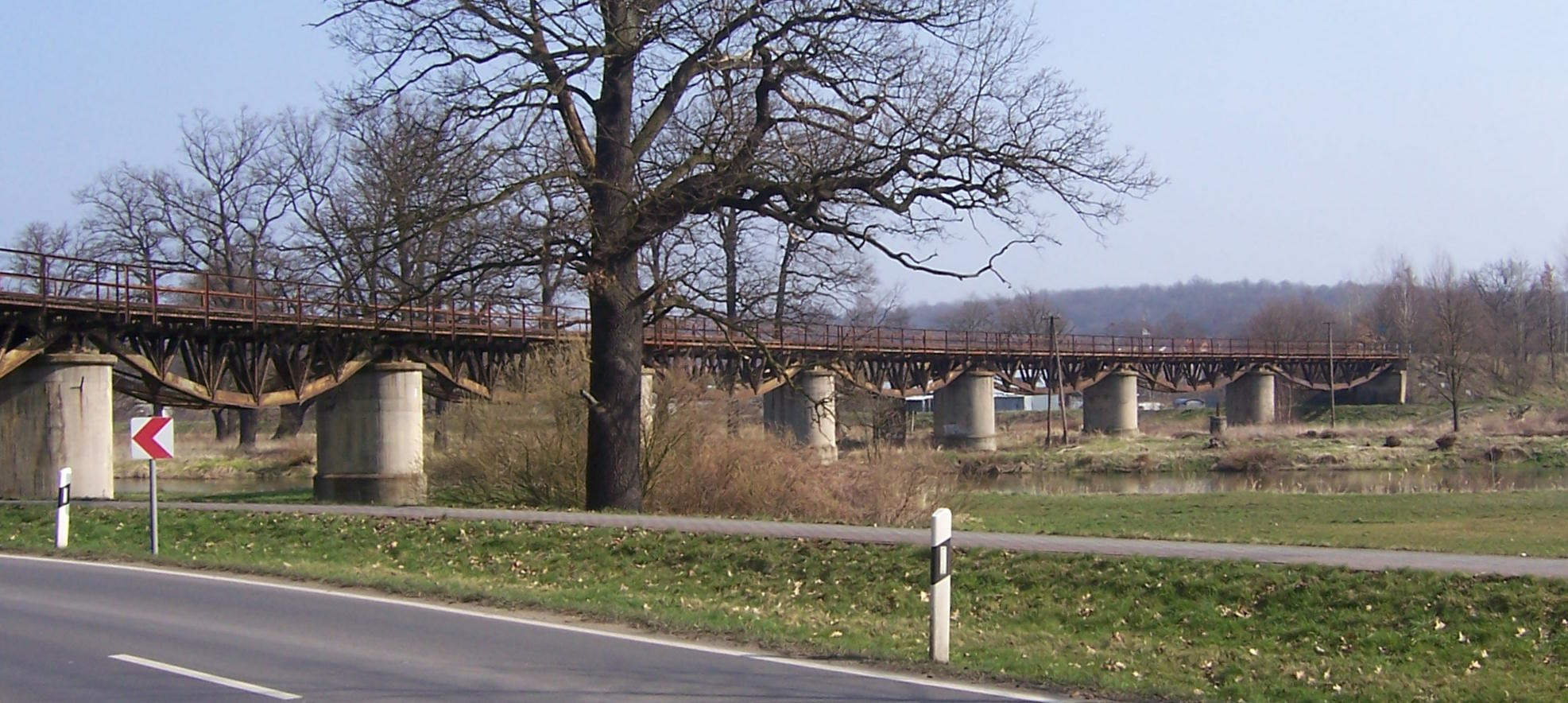
Abandoned bridge crossing the Neisse near Bad Muskau

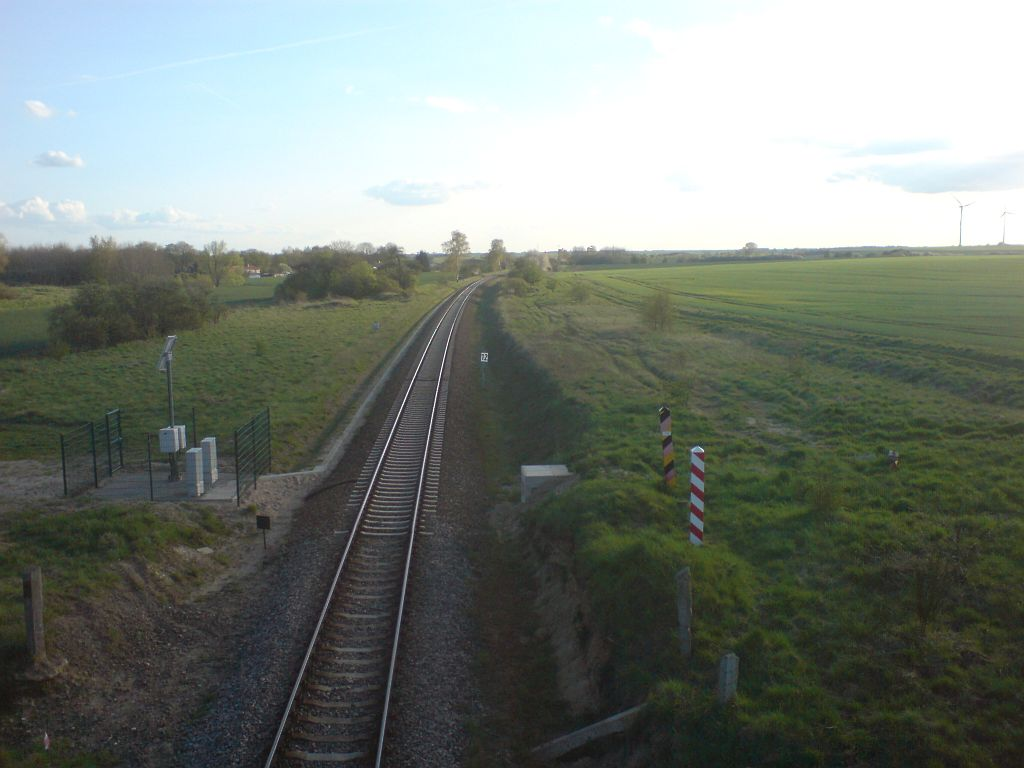
Railway Szczecin-Berlin line crosses Polish-German border

- Kopaczów (Oberullersdorf) - Zittau (1859-1945), trains currently do not stop on the Polish territory, peage only
- Sieniawka (Kleinschönau) - Zittau (-1945), narrow gauge
- Hirschfelde - Krzewina Zgorzelecka - Hagenwerder, border checkpoint at the Krzewina Zgorzelecka railway station
- Zawidów - Hagenwerder (1875-1945)
- Zgorzelec - Görlitz
- Węgliniec - Horka
- Sanice (Sänitz) - Steinbach (1908-1945), Horka-Przewóz line
- Łęknica - Bad Muskau, narrow gauge
- Zasieki - Forst (Lausitz)
- Gubin - Guben
- Gubinek - Guben
- Kunice - Kunitz
- Kunowice - Frankfurt
- Kostrzyn nad Odrą - Küstrin-Kietz
- Siekierki - Neurüdnitz (1897-1982), former Wriezener Bahn
- Szczecin - Tantow
- Barnisław - Ladenthin (1899-1945)
- Szczecin - Grambow
- Świnoujście - Garz (1894-1945)
- Świnoujście - Heringsdorf (1894-1945, 2008-)

== Poland - Sweden ==
- Swinoujscie - Ystad, train ferry, freight only

== Unrealised projects ==
- Chałupki (Annaberg) - Hlučín

== Literature ==
- Bernd Kuhlmann, Eisenbahnen über die Oder-Neiße-Grenze, Ritzau KG - Verlag Zeit und Eisenbahn, Pürgen 2004, ISBN 3-935101-06-6
- Miroslav Jelen, Zrušené železniční tratě v Čechách, na Moravě a ve Slezsku, Dokořán 2009, ISBN 978-80-7363-129-1
- EC (11 July 2023). "Strategy for the EU integration of the Ukrainian and Moldovan rail systems". transport.ec.europa.eu. European Commission. (160 pages).

== See also ==
- Czech rail border crossings
- History of rail transport in Poland
- Hungarian rail border crossings
- Slovak rail border crossings
