= Géza Udvary =

Hungarian painter

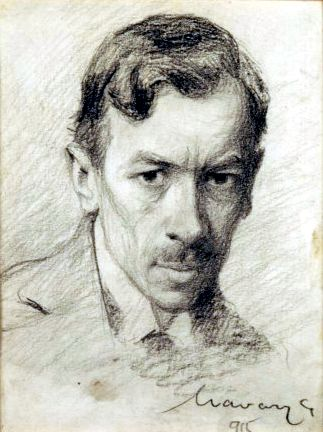
- Self-portrait (1915)
- Born: Géza László Udvary; 20 September 1872; Perbenyik, Kingdom of Hungary
- Died: 4 February 1932 (aged 59); Budapest, Kingdom of Hungary
- Movement: Romantic

Géza László Udvary (20 September 1872, Perbenyik - 4 February 1932, Budapest) was a Hungarian painter in the Romantic style.

== Biography ==
He attended the public schools of Kassa and Debrecen, then studied painting at a private school operated by Bertalan Karlovszky. Later, he enrolled at the "School of Decorative Arts" in Budapest. He also pursued his studies, briefly, in Vienna, Munich, Paris and several places in Italy.

At first, he concentrated on landscapes and portraits, but then turned to paintings of figures in the Renaissance style, for which he is best-known. After returning home, he spent seven years studying fresco painting in the master-class of Károly Lotz and would later create historical murals for the Hungarian Parliament Building. In 1901, he was appointed Professor of Figural Morphology at the "National School of Applied Arts". He also worked as a drawing teacher from 1903 to 1931.

From 1917 to 1918, a major exhibition of his works was held by the "Képírók Képfaragók Szalonjában" (a painter's association). After his death, a large retrospective was presented at the Műcsarnok (Hall of Art).

His son, Pál Udvary, also became a well-known painter.

== Selected paintings ==
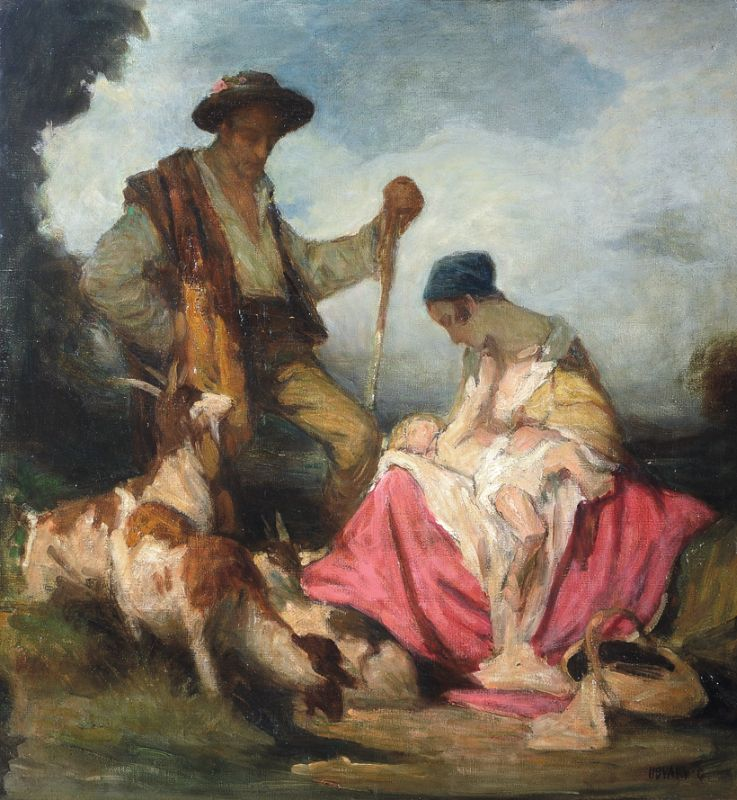
A Family at Rest

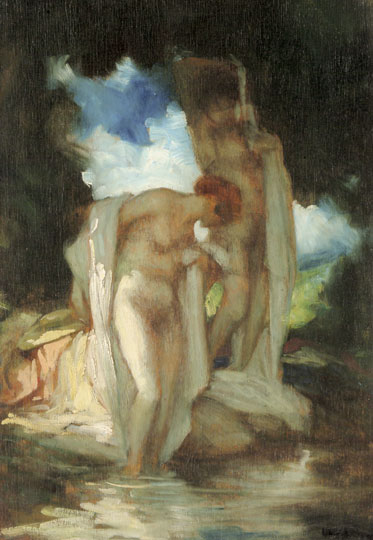
After the Bath

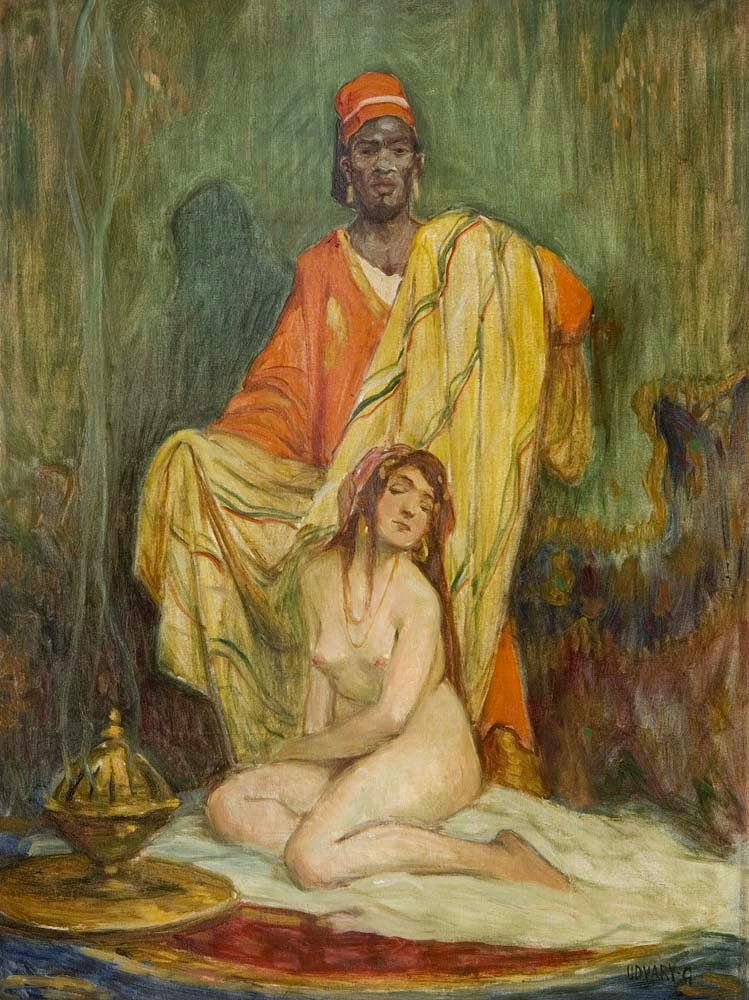
The Slave Trader

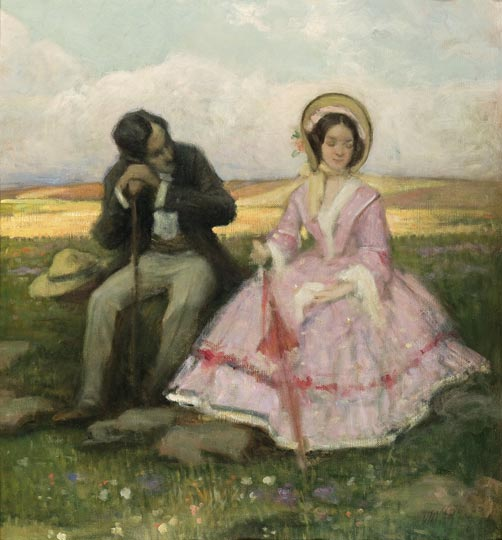
Courting
