= Kopaczów =

- Village
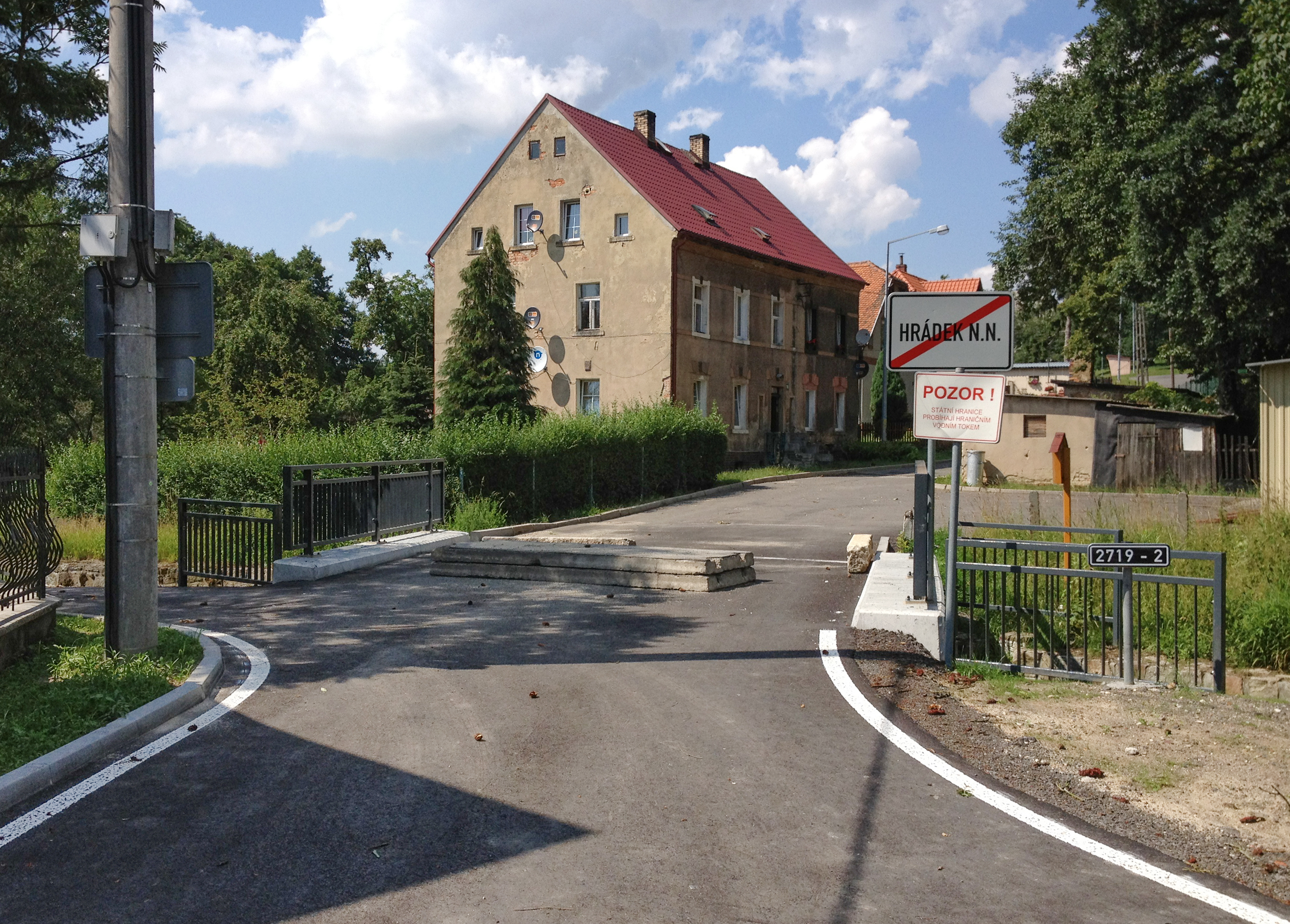
- Interactive map of Kopaczów
- Location within Poland
- Coordinates: 50°52′15″N 14°51′05″E
- Country: Poland
- Voivodeship: Lower Silesian Voivodeship
- County: Zgorzelec
- Gmina: Bogatynia

Population
  - Total: 329

Kopaczów [kɔˈpat͡ʂuf] (German: Oberullersdorf; Upper Sorbian: Hornja Ułrja) is a village in the administrative district of Gmina Bogatynia, within Zgorzelec County, Lower Silesian Voivodeship, in south-western Poland, close to the Czech and German borders.
