= Drávasztára =

Drávasztára Starin
- Village
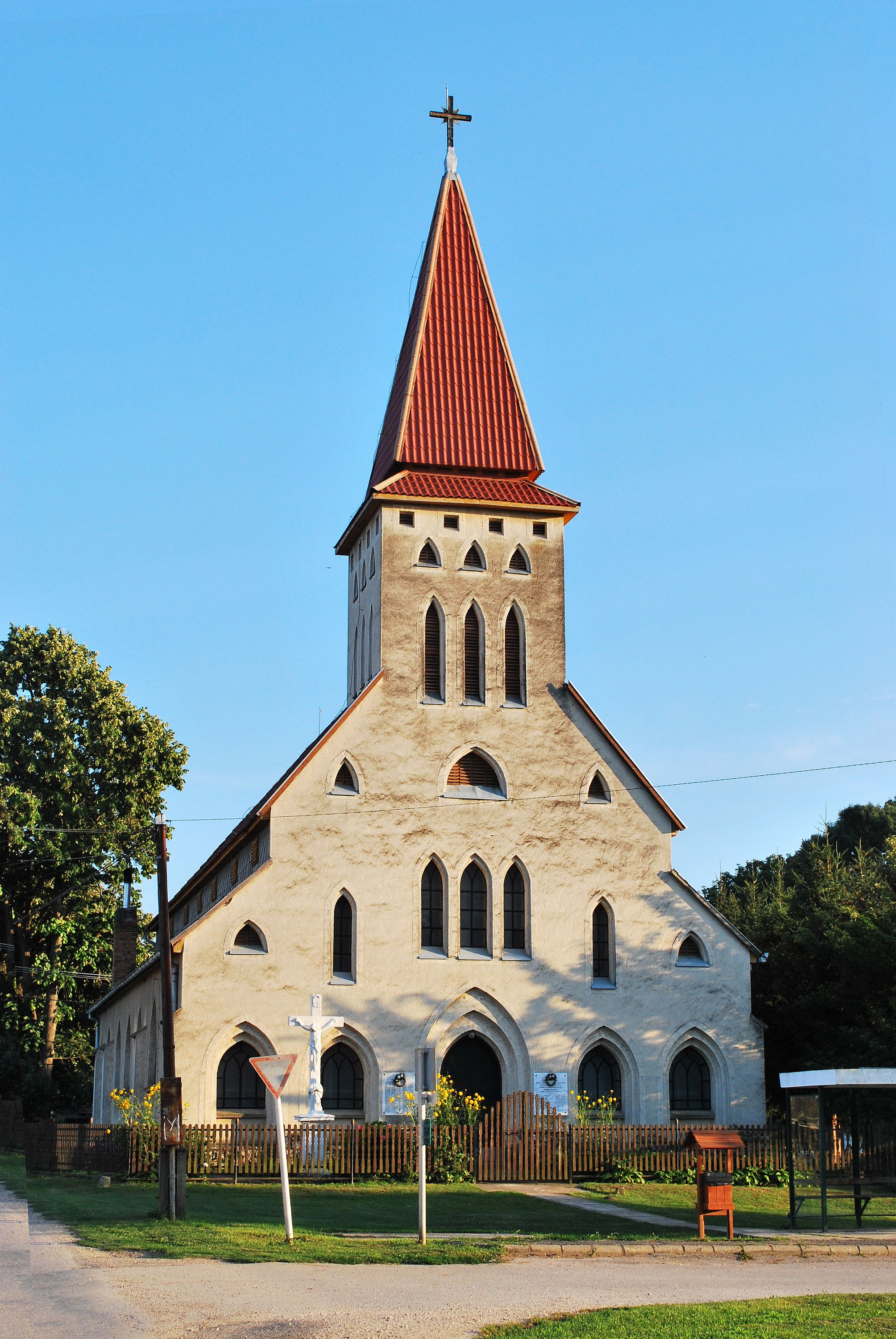
- Roman Catholic church in Drávasztára
- Interactive map of Drávasztára
- Coordinates: 45°49′N 17°49′E
- Country: Hungary
- County: Baranya

Area
  - Total: 7.02 sq mi (18.18 km^{2})

Population (2023)
  - Total: 367
  - Density: 52.3/sq mi (20.2/km^{2})
- Time zone: UTC+1 (CET)
  - Summer (DST): UTC+2 (CEST)

Drávasztára (Croatian: Starin) is a village in Baranya County, Hungary.

== Demographics ==
As of 2022, the town was 85.8% Hungarian, 34% Croatian, 3% German, and 1.4% Gypsy. The population was 57% Roman Catholic, and 4.1% Reformed.
