= Abovce =

Abovce Abafalva
- Municipality
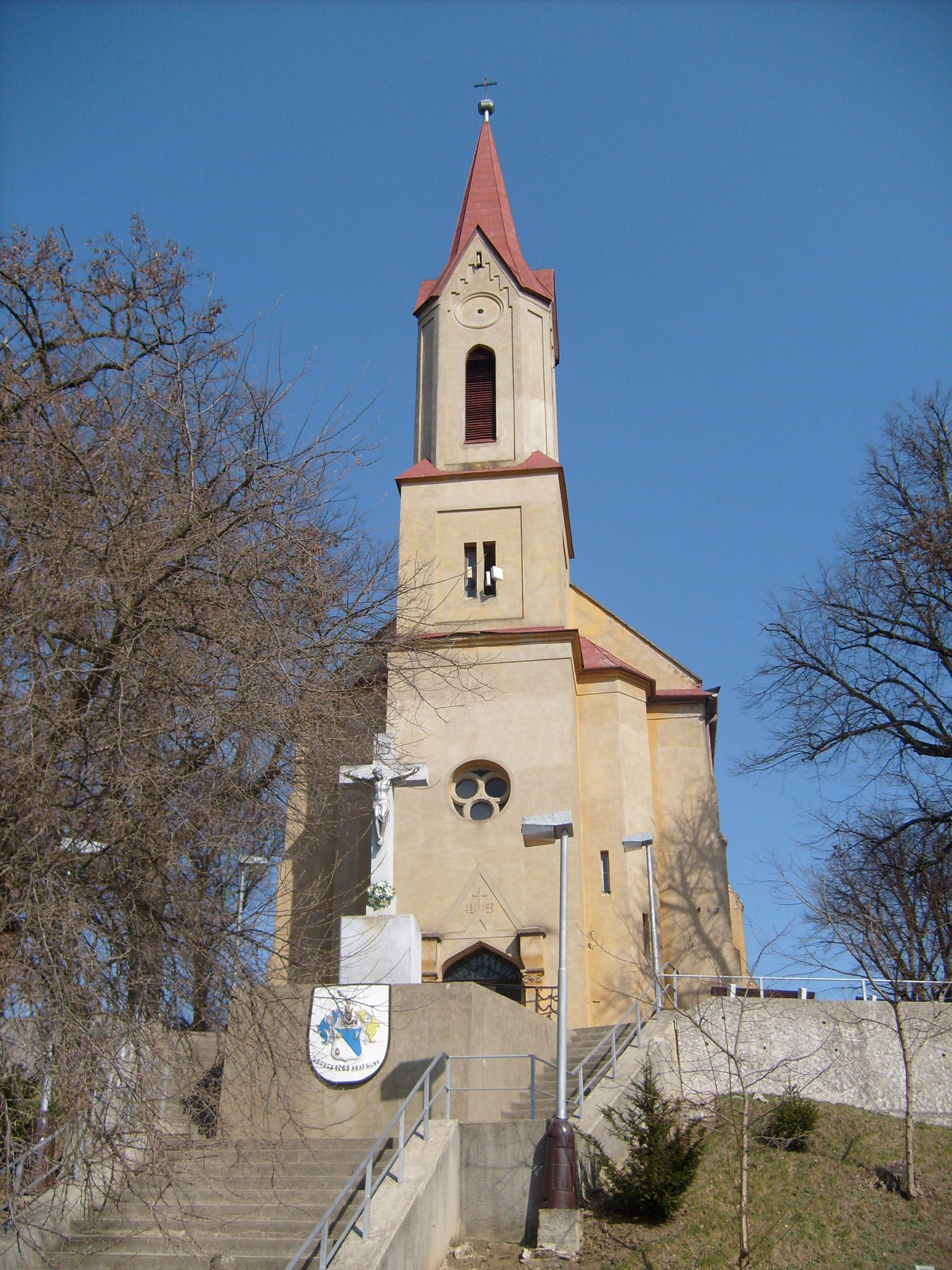

- Flag

- Location of Abovce in the Banská Bystrica Region Location of Abovce in Slovakia
- Coordinates: 48.27°N 20.28°E
- Country: Slovakia
- Region: Banská Bystrica Region
- District: Rimavská Sobota District
- First mentioned: 1339

Area
  - Total: 8.19 km^{2} (3.16 sq mi)
- Elevation: 159 m (522 ft)

Population (2025)
  - Total: 605
- Time zone: UTC+1 (CET)
  - Summer (DST): UTC+2 (CEST)
- Postal code: 980 44
- Area code: +421 47
- Vehicle registration plate (until 2022): RS
- Website: www.obecabovce.sk

Abovce (Hungarian: Abafalva) is a village and municipality in the Rimavská Sobota District of the Banská Bystrica Region of Slovakia. The village retains its agricultural character. Most important sightseeing is a village manor house.

== Geography ==
The municipality lies at an altitude of 159 metres (522 ft) and covers an area of 8.19 km^{2} (3.16 sq mi) (2025).

== History ==
In 2010 had been the settlement from the Bronze Age. In historical records, the village was first mentioned in 1339 (Abafalwa) when it belonged to the local noble family Abaffy. In 1380 name of the village is Hanua. In 15th and 16th centuries it suffered devastation and afterwards many epidemics beat its inhabitants. From 1938 to 1945 it belonged to Hungary under the First Vienna Award. In the village are community centre, mourning house, elementary school, kindergarten, espresso bar and petrol station.

== Genealogical resources ==
The records for genealogical research are available at the state archive in Banská Bystrica (Slovak: Štátny archív v Banskej Bystrici).

- Roman Catholic church records (births/marriages/deaths): ????-???? (parish: Putnok, Hungary)
- Reformated church records (births/marriages/deaths): 1730–1895
- Lutheran church records (births/marriages/deaths): 1778–1899
- Census records 1869 of Abovce are not available at the state archive.

== Population ==
Population statistic (10 years)
Year	1995	2005	2015	2025
Count	571	617	624	605
Difference		+8.05%	+1.13%	−3.04%

Population statistic
Year	2024	2025
Count	612	605
Difference		−1.14%

It has a population of 605 people (31 December 2025).

=== Ethnicity ===
Census 2021 (1+ %)
Ethnicity	Number	Fraction
Hungarian	490	78.14%
Slovak	140	22.32%
Romani	80	12.75%
Not found out	13	2.07%
Total	627	

In year 2021 was 627 people by ethnicity 490 as Hungarian, 140 as Slovak, 80 as Romani, 13 as Not found out, 3 as German and 1 as Bulgarian.

Note on population: The difference values of population numbers in the table "Population statistic" and in the sections "Ethnicity" & "Religion" is caused by the use of various statistical methods.

=== Religion ===
Census 2021 (1+ %)
Religion	Number	Fraction
Roman Catholic Church	435	69.38%
Evangelical Church	71	11.32%
None	66	10.53%
Calvinist Church	28	4.47%
Not found out	9	1.44%
Total	627	

In year 2021 was 627 people by religion 435 from Roman Catholic Church, 71 from Evangelical Church, 66 from None, 28 from Calvinist Church, 9 from Not found out, 4 from Christian Congregations in Slovakia, 3 from Jehovah's Witnesses, 3 from Greek Catholic Church, 3 from Apostolic Church, 2 from Other, 1 from United Methodist Church, 1 from Buddhism and 1 from Ad hoc movements.

== See also ==
- List of municipalities and towns in Slovakia
