= Nagybörzsöny =

Nagybörzsöny Deutschpilsen
- Village
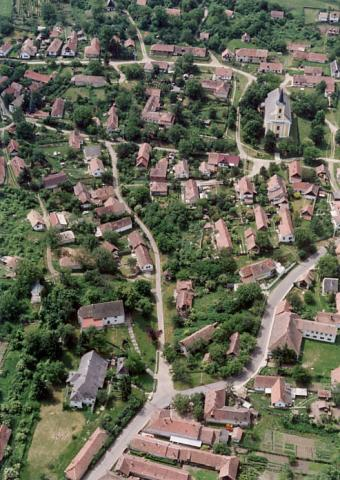

- Flag Seal

- Location within Hungary
- Coordinates: 47°56′N 18°50′E
- Country: Hungary
- Region: Central Hungary
- County: Pest County
- Sub region: Szobi

Area
  - Total: 50.69 km^{2} (19.57 sq mi)

Population (1 January 2008)
  - Total: 795
  - Density: 15.68/km^{2} (40.6/sq mi)
- Time zone: UTC+1 (CET)
  - Summer (DST): UTC+2 (CEST)
- Postal code: 2634
- Area code: 36 27
- Website: nagyborzsony.hu

Nagybörzsöny (German: Deutschpilsen or Deutsch Pilsen) is a village in Pest County, Hungary.

== Location ==
Nagybörzsöny is a village in the Börzsöny Mountains. It is near the National Park of Duna-Ipoly. The Börzsöny-creek flows through the village.

== History ==
The earlier name of this village was Börzsöny and it was, in all probability, founded in the 12th century by King Géza II of Hungary. In medieval times, it was able to grow into a full-fledged mining town due to its proximity to various ores, including gold. Documents dating from 1312 already describe these mines. However, the most significant part in the mines' history took place in the eighteenth century. In 1789, Pál Kitaibel officially discovered the element Tellurium in the Nagybörzsöny ores. Two other Hungarians were also noted for their research of the element. In 1782, Franz-Joseph Müller von Reichenstein, otherwise known as (Müller Ferenc), independently named the element. A third Hungarian who also laid claim to Tellurium was Ignaz von Born. Muller was from Sibiu/Nagyszeben in what is now Transylvania, and von Born worked in Vienna. In 1798, the new element was named by Martin Heinrich Klaproth; the name is derived from the Latin word "tellus", meaning earth. Tellurium has thermoelectric applications, and was used in alloys within the steel industry. The element eventually played an important role in the making of the outer shell of the first atom bomb.

== Transport ==
It is the terminus of a narrow-gauge railway to Szob.

== Sightseeings ==
- The main attraction of the village is an architectural one: The Árpád age romanesque church Szent István-templom, built in the 13th century. The church is surrounded by walls.
- Saint Nicolaus church
- Church of the miners. Gothic style, built in the 14th century
- Evangelic church classicist style, built in the 18th century
- Watermill: industrial memorial

== Gallery ==
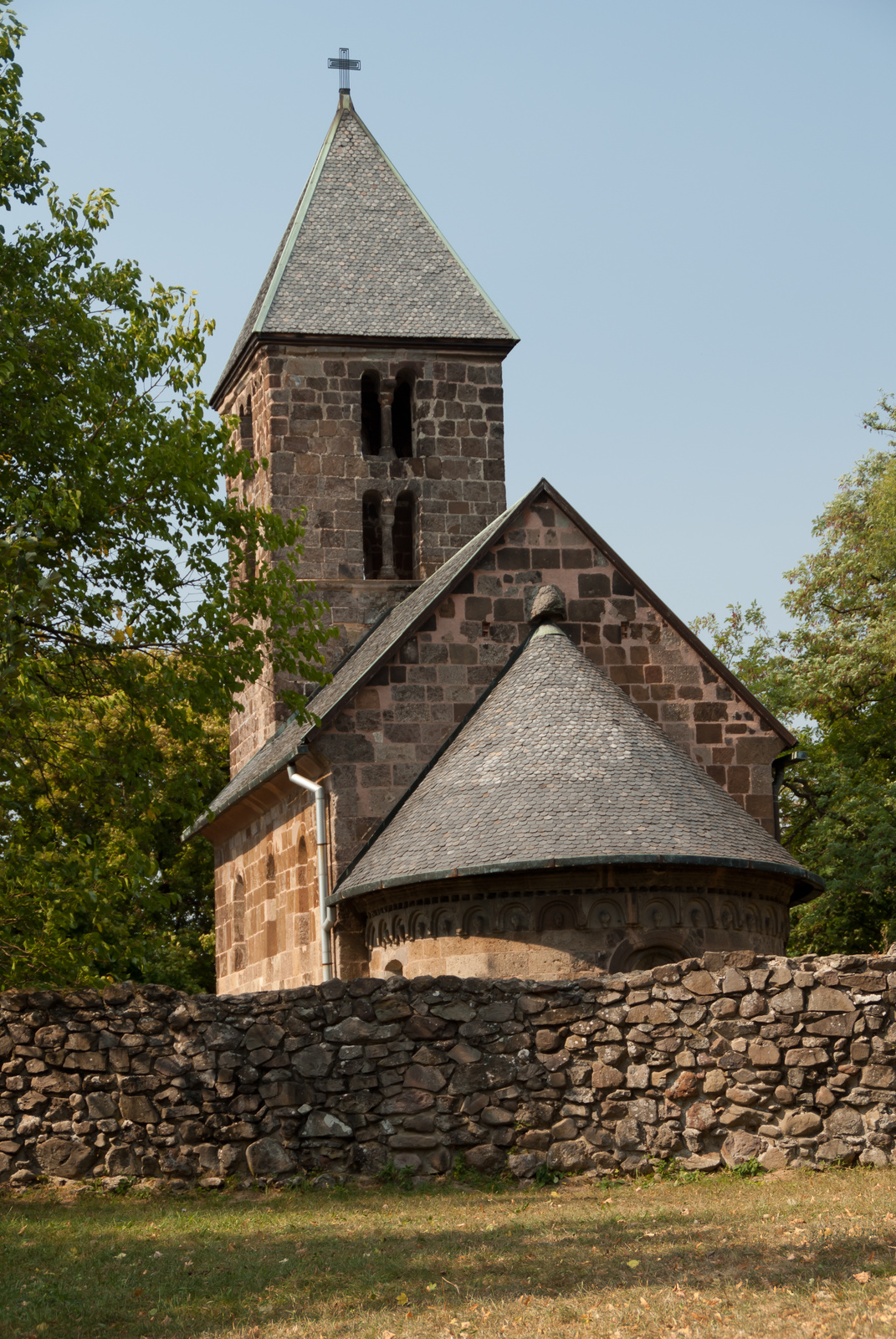

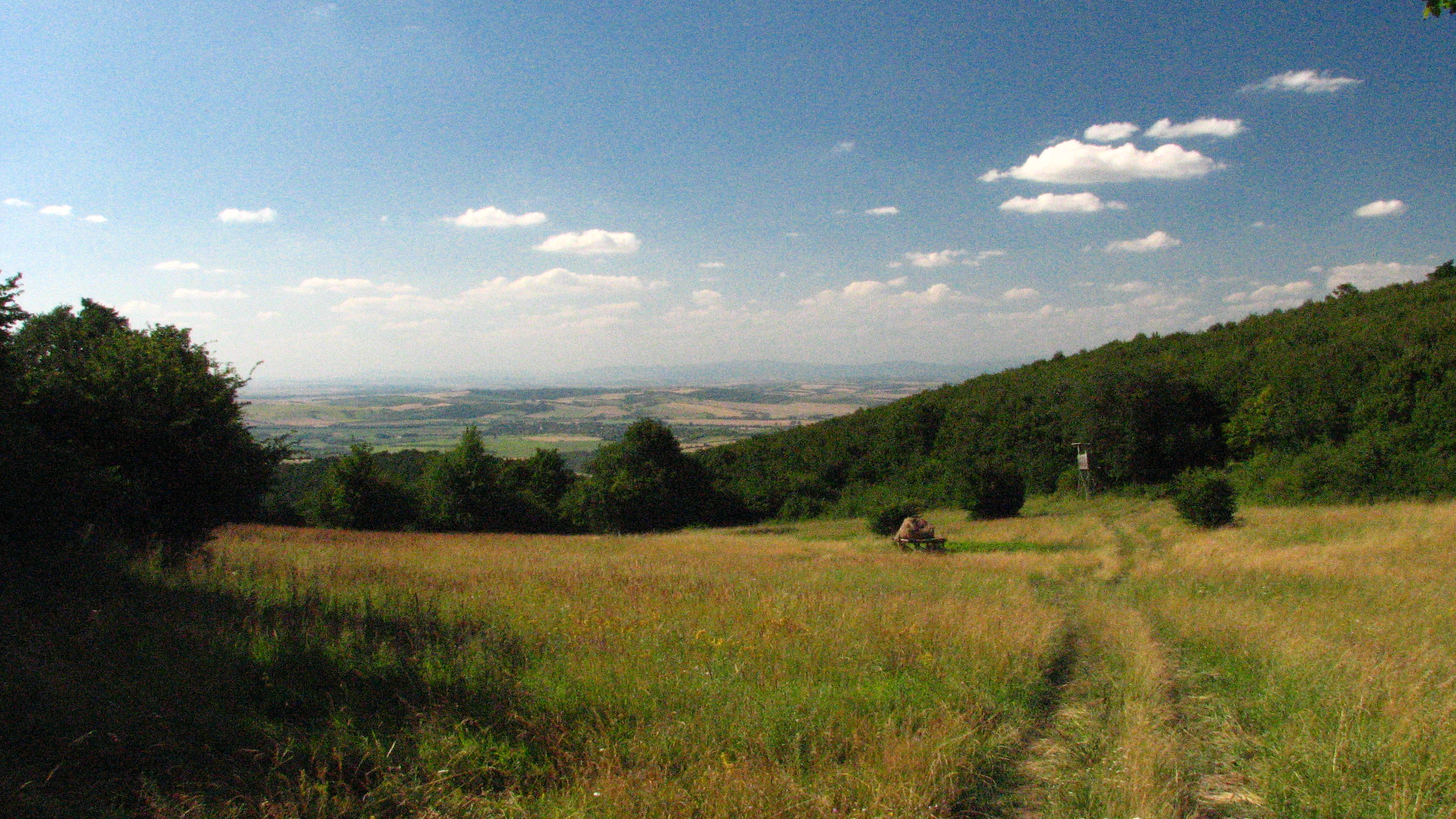

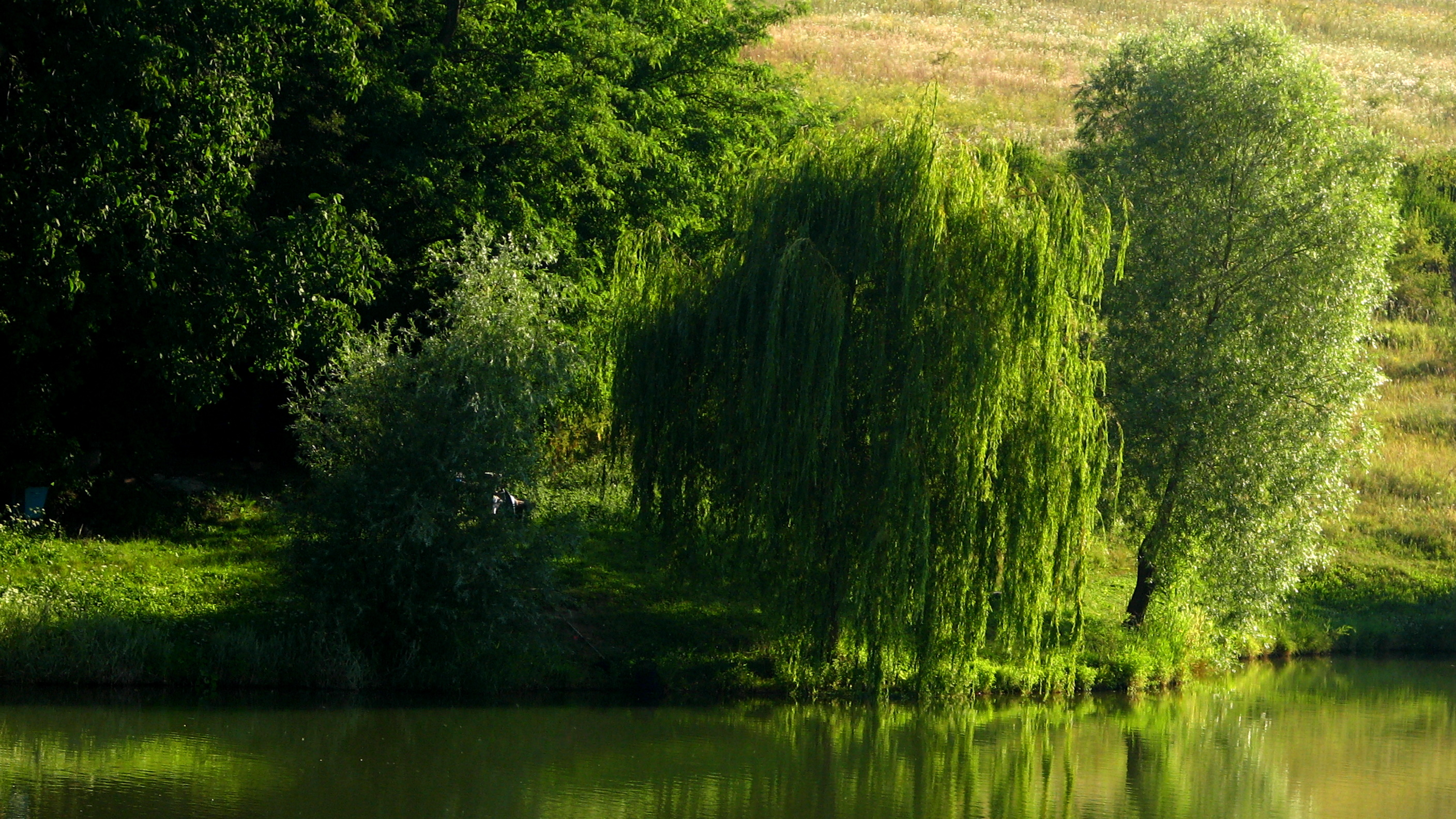
