= Chľaba =

Village and municipality in Slovakia

Chľaba Helemba
- Municipality
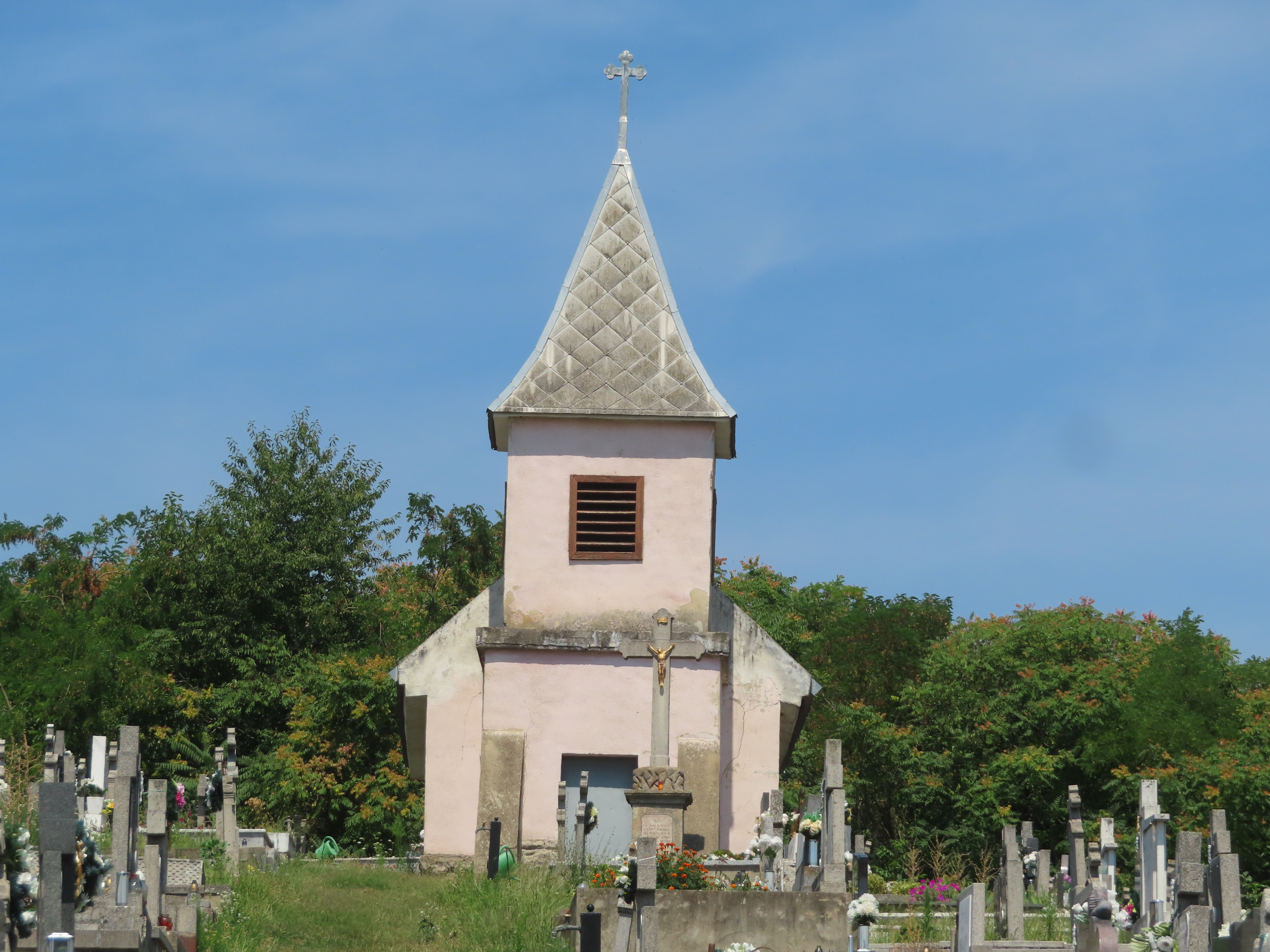

- Flag

- Location of Chľaba in the Nitra Region Location of Chľaba in Slovakia
- Coordinates: 47.83°N 18.83°E
- Country: Slovakia
- Region: Nitra Region
- District: Nové Zámky District
- First mentioned: 1138

Area
  - Total: 13.86 km^{2} (5.35 sq mi)
- Elevation: 115 m (377 ft)

Population (2025)
  - Total: 695
- Time zone: UTC+1 (CET)
  - Summer (DST): UTC+2 (CEST)
- Postal code: 943 66
- Area code: +421 36
- Vehicle registration plate (until 2022): NZ
- Website: www.chlaba.sk

Chľaba (Hungarian: Helemba) is a village and municipality in the Nové Zámky District in the Nitra Region of south-west Slovakia.

== History ==
In historical records the village was first mentioned in 1138

== Geography ==
The municipality lies at an altitude of 115 metres (377 ft) and covers an area of 13.86 km^{2} (5.35 sq mi) (2025).

== Population ==
Population statistic (10 years)
Year	1995	2005	2015	2025
Count	709	710	708	695
Difference		+0.14%	−0.28%	−1.83%

Population statistic
Year	2024	2025
Count	686	695
Difference		+1.31%

It has a population of 695 people (31 December 2025).

=== Ethnicity ===
Census 2021 (1+ %)
Ethnicity	Number	Fraction
Hungarian	538	76.31%
Slovak	191	27.09%
Not found out	22	3.12%
Total	705	

In year 2021 was 705 people by ethnicity 538 as Hungarian, 191 as Slovak, 22 as Not found out, 6 as Czech, 1 as Italian, 1 as Other and 1 as English.

Note on population: The difference values of population numbers in the table "Population statistic" and in the sections "Ethnicity" & "Religion" is caused by the use of various statistical methods.

=== Religion ===
Census 2021 (1+ %)
Religion	Number	Fraction
Roman Catholic Church	535	75.89%
None	132	18.72%
Not found out	17	2.41%
Calvinist Church	11	1.56%
Total	705	

In year 2021 was 705 people by religion 535 from Roman Catholic Church, 132 from None, 17 from Not found out, 11 from Calvinist Church, 4 from Greek Catholic Church, 3 from Evangelical Church, 2 from Christian Congregations in Slovakia and 1 from Other and not ascertained christian church.

According to the Census of inhabitants, houses and apartments in 2011, Chľaba had 695 inhabitants, of which 350 were men and 345 were women. 543 inhabitants (78.1%) claimed to be Hungarian and 123 (17.7%) to Slovak nationality. Roman Catholic Church is predominant in the village, to which 602 (86.6%) Chľabans registered.

== Facilities ==
The village has a public library and a football pitch.

== Genealogical resources ==
The records for genealogical research are available at the state archive "Statny Archiv in Nitra, Slovakia"

- Roman Catholic church records (births/marriages/deaths): 1839-1895 (parish A)

== See also ==
- List of municipalities and towns in Slovakia
