= Kalonda =

Kalonda Kalonda
- Municipality
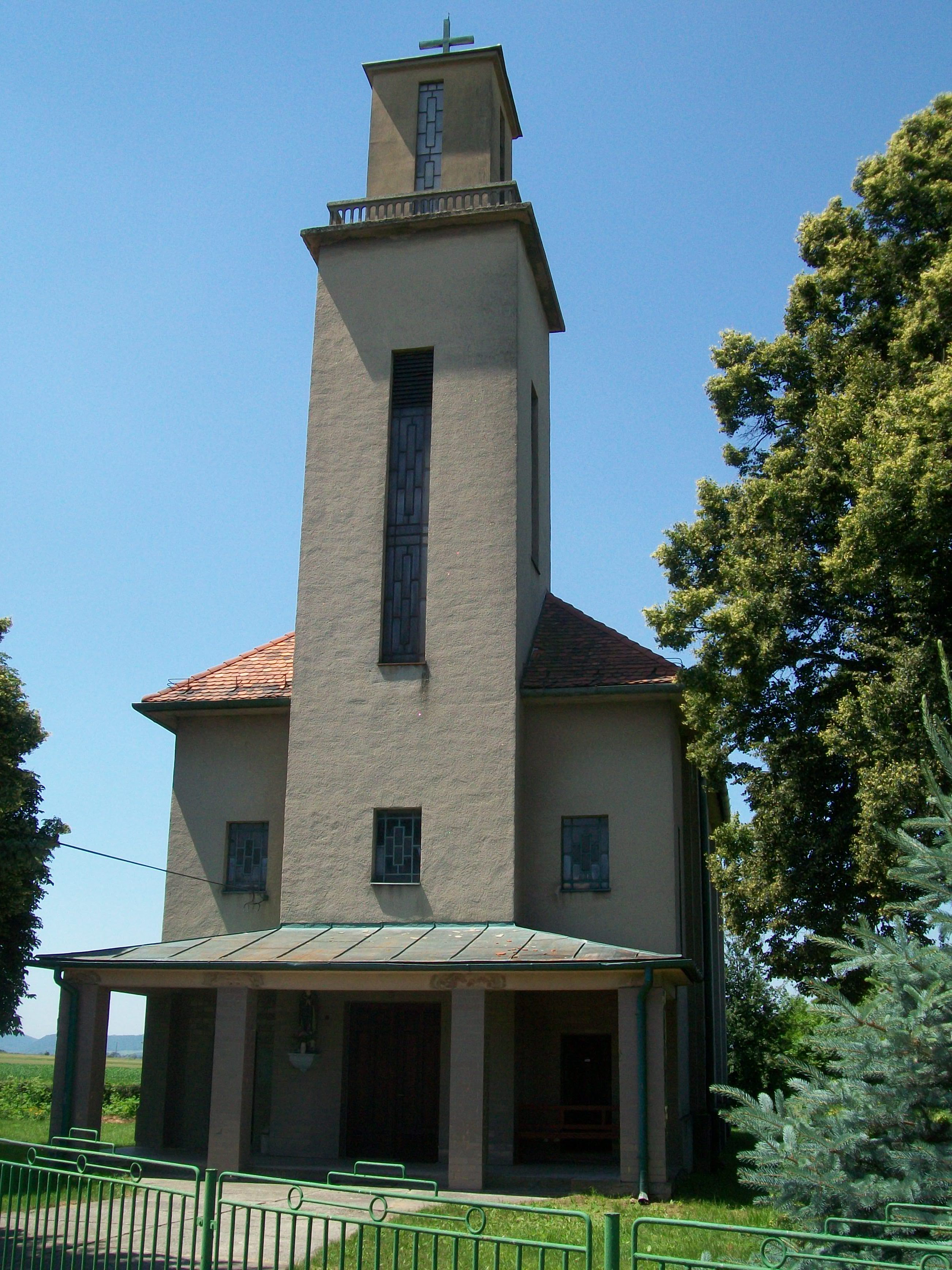
- Roman Catholic church in Kalonda

- Flag

- Location of Kalonda in the Banská Bystrica Region Location of Kalonda in Slovakia
- Coordinates: 48.27°N 19.65°E
- Country: Slovakia
- Region: Banská Bystrica Region
- District: Lučenec District
- First mentioned: 1238

Area
  - Total: 8.79 km^{2} (3.39 sq mi)
- Elevation: 168 m (551 ft)

Population (2025)
  - Total: 193
- Time zone: UTC+1 (CET)
  - Summer (DST): UTC+2 (CEST)
- Postal code: 985 31
- Area code: +421 47
- Vehicle registration plate (until 2022): LC
- Website: www.kalonda.sk

Kalonda (Hungarian: Kalonda) is a village and municipality in the Lučenec District in the Banská Bystrica Region of Slovakia.

== Geography ==
The municipality lies at an altitude of 168 metres (551 ft) and covers an area of 8.79 km^{2} (3.39 sq mi) (2025).

== Population ==
Population statistic (10 years)
Year	1995	2005	2015	2025
Count	222	227	209	193
Difference		+2.25%	−7.92%	−7.65%

Population statistic
Year	2024	2025
Count	195	193
Difference		−1.02%

It has a population of 193 people (31 December 2025).

=== Ethnicity ===
Census 2021 (1+ %)
Ethnicity	Number	Fraction
Hungarian	107	54.04%
Slovak	94	47.47%
Not found out	8	4.04%
Total	198	

In year 2021 was 198 people by ethnicity 107 as Hungarian, 94 as Slovak, 8 as Not found out, 1 as Jewish, 1 as Czech and 1 as Ukrainian.

Note on population: The difference values of population numbers in the table "Population statistic" and in the sections "Ethnicity" & "Religion" is caused by the use of various statistical methods.

=== Religion ===
Census 2021 (1+ %)
Religion	Number	Fraction
Roman Catholic Church	152	76.77%
None	27	13.64%
Not found out	6	3.03%
Evangelical Church	6	3.03%
Baptists Church	4	2.02%
Calvinist Church	2	1.01%
Total	198	

In year 2021 was 198 people by religion 152 from Roman Catholic Church, 27 from None, 6 from Not found out, 6 from Evangelical Church, 4 from Baptists Church, 2 from Calvinist Church and 1 from Greek Catholic Church.

== Genealogical resources ==
The records for genealogical research are available at the state archive (Statny Archiv) in Banska Bystrica, the region's capital.

- Roman Catholic church records (births/marriages/deaths): 1724-1896 (parish B)
- Lutheran church records (births/marriages/deaths): 1783-1895 (parish B)

== See also ==
- List of municipalities and towns in Slovakia
