= Kechnec =

Kechnec Kenyhec
- Municipality
- Flag

- Location of Kechnec in the Košice Region Location of Kechnec in Slovakia
- Coordinates: 48.55°N 21.27°E
- Country: Slovakia
- Region: Košice Region
- District: Košice-okolie District
- First mentioned: 1220

Area
  - Total: 10.21 km^{2} (3.94 sq mi)
- Elevation: 171 m (561 ft)

Population (2025)
  - Total: 1,141
- Time zone: UTC+1 (CET)
  - Summer (DST): UTC+2 (CEST)
- Postal code: 445 8
- Area code: +421 55
- Vehicle registration plate (until 2022): KS
- Website: kechnec.sk

Kechnec (German: Kechnetz; Hungarian: Kenyhec) is a village in eastern Slovakia.

== Geography ==
The municipality lies at an altitude of 171 metres (561 ft) and covers an area of 10.21 km^{2} (3.94 sq mi) (2025). The municipality is part of the administrative units Košice-okolie District and Košice Region.

== History ==
Historically, the village was first mentioned in 1220 as a settlement called Felnemet. Being on the Hungarian Queen’s land at the lower stream of the River Hornád, the territory of Kechnec was settled by German immigrants at the turn of the 12th and 13th centuries. We know that from the Varadin’s Register of 1220. In 1295 the Queen Agnes gave the town of Kechnec, together with another 7 small towns to Menne, a surrogate breastfeeder of King Ladislaus IV of Hungary. An old document dated to 1338 says that in this town there was a mill, located near the present town of Seňa, which was preserved to the modern times. This documents active work and life of local farmers. The King Sigmund, another major player in the history of the town, gave Kechnec to the Marmoss administrator Peter of Perin. It was a gift for his loyalty and military merits. This fact documents the importance of Kechnec at that time. The donation and merit document is interesting due to its bilingual name – Felnemethy alio domine Kemnech. Although already before the time of arrival of German colonists the town of Kechnec had had its own Slavic name, which the Germans adopted, it also got its official Hungarian name Felnémeti. In 1560 the town was named Kenyhecz Nempty, in 1605 Kenyhecz, in 1808 Kechnec, and the last mentioned name has been preserved until now. According to the conscriptions of local priests and churches, in 1746 people in Kechnec spoke Slovak. A number of major landowners were resident in the town, from among which it is worth to mention the Kenyheczi and Czikovics families. János Czikovics obtained Kechnec from King Leopold I in 1689 in Vienna.

== Population ==
Population statistic (10 years)
Year	1995	2005	2015	2025
Count	856	978	1173	1141
Difference		+14.25%	+19.93%	−2.72%

Population statistic
Year	2024	2025
Count	1142	1141
Difference		−0.08%

It has a population of 1141 people (31 December 2025).

=== Ethnicity ===
Census 2021 (1+%)
Ethnicity	Number	Fraction
Slovak	990	87.07%
Hungarian	170	14.95%
Not found out	30	2.63%
Romani	16	1.4%
Total	1137	

In year 2021 was 1137 people by ethnicity 990 as Slovak, 170 as Hungarian, 30 as Not found out, 16 as Romani, 7 as Other, 4 as Russian, 3 as Rusyn, 2 as Ukrainian and 1 as German.

Note on population: The difference values of population numbers in the table "Population statistic" and in the sections "Ethnicity" & "Religion" is caused by the use of various statistical methods.

=== Religion ===
Census 2021 (1+%)
Religion	Number	Fraction
Roman Catholic Church	780	68.6%
None	113	9.94%
Calvinist Church	109	9.59%
Greek Catholic Church	66	5.8%
Not found out	31	2.73%
Evangelical Church	30	2.64%
Total	1137	

In year 2021 was 1137 people by religion 780 from Roman Catholic Church, 113 from None, 109 from Calvinist Church, 66 from Greek Catholic Church, 31 from Not found out, 30 from Evangelical Church, 2 from Ad hoc movements, 1 from Old Catholic Church, 1 from Eastern Orthodox Church, 1 from Christian Congregations in Slovakia, 1 from Hinduism, 1 from United Methodist Church and 1 from Baptists Church.

== Economy ==
Kechnec is developing as an industrial center in the region. Kechnec Industrial Zone is a greenfield site of 332 hectares (820 acres) with constructed public infrastructure. New investors are establishing operations in the zone, creating employment opportunities.

== Twin towns — sister cities ==
Kechnec is twinned with:

- Isaszeg, Hungary

== Genealogical resources ==
The records for genealogical research are available at the state archive "Statny Archiv in Kosice, Slovakia"

- Roman Catholic church records (births/marriages/deaths): 1714-1895 (parish A)
- Greek Catholic church records (births/marriages/deaths): 1791-1896 (parish B)
- Reformated church records (births/marriages/deaths): 1794-1901 (parish B)

== See also ==
- List of municipalities and towns in Slovakia
