= Nógrádszakál =

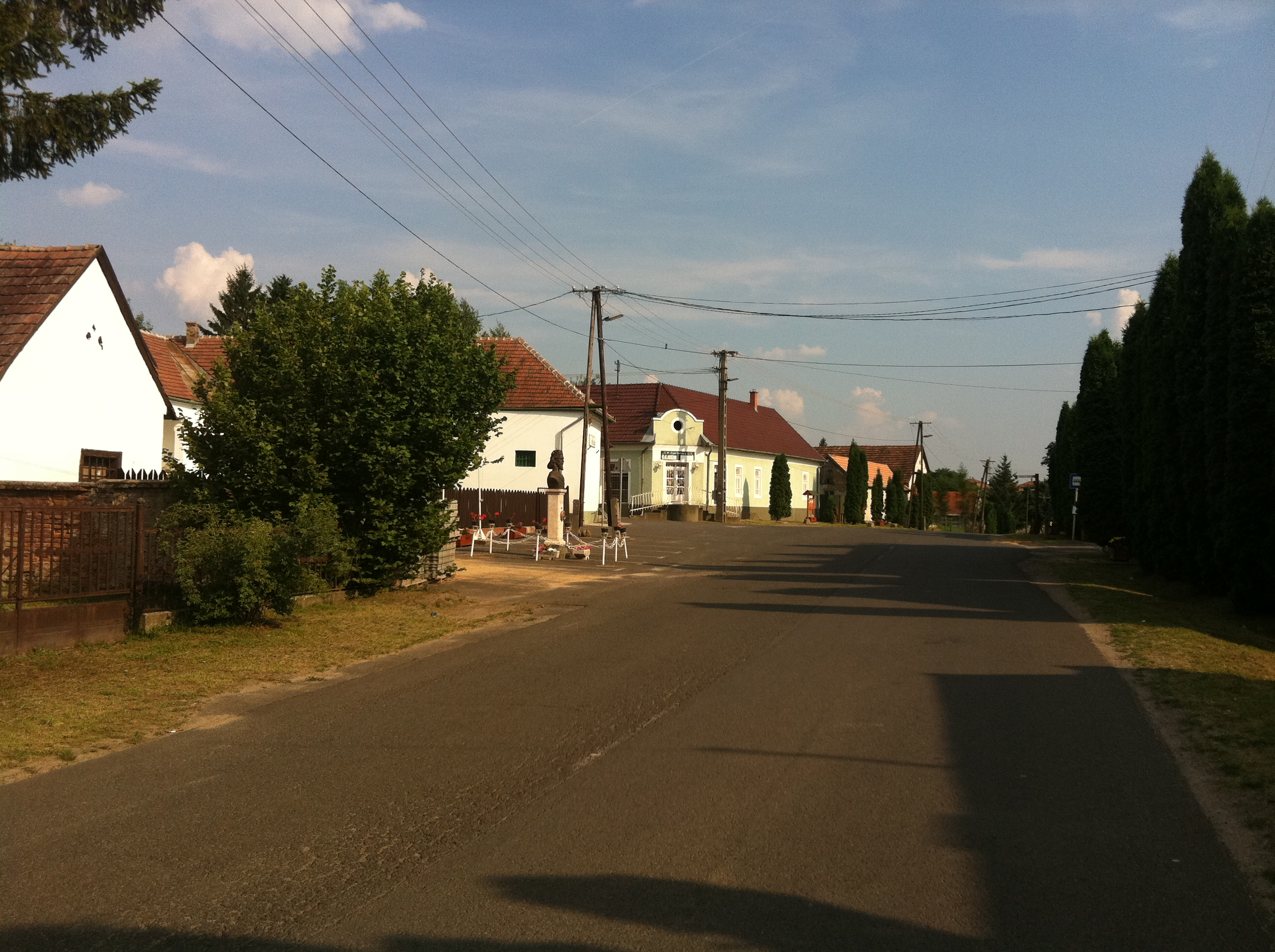

- Location of Nógrádszakál
- Coordinates: 48°10′52″N 19°31′32″E
- Country: Hungary
- Statistical large region: Great Plain and North
- Region: Northern Hungary
- County: Nógrád
- Subregion: Szécsényi

Government
  - Mayor: Judit Radvánszky

Area
  - Total: 18.79 km^{2} (7.25 sq mi)

Population (2025)
  - Total: 550
  - Density: 3,151/km^{2} (8,160/sq mi)
- Time zone: UTC+1 (CET)
  - Summer (DST): UTC+2 (CEST)
- Postal code: 3187
- Area code: 32

Nógrádszakál is a village in Nógrád County, Hungary with 550 inhabitants (2025).
