= Zemplénagárd =

- Village
- Location within Hungary
- Coordinates: 48°21′N 22°05′E
- Country: Hungary
- Regions: Northern Hungary
- County: Borsod-Abaúj-Zemplén County
- Time zone: UTC+1 (CET)
  - Summer (DST): UTC+2 (CEST)

Zemplénagárd is a village in Borsod-Abaúj-Zemplén County in northeastern Hungary.
