= Bánréve =

- Village
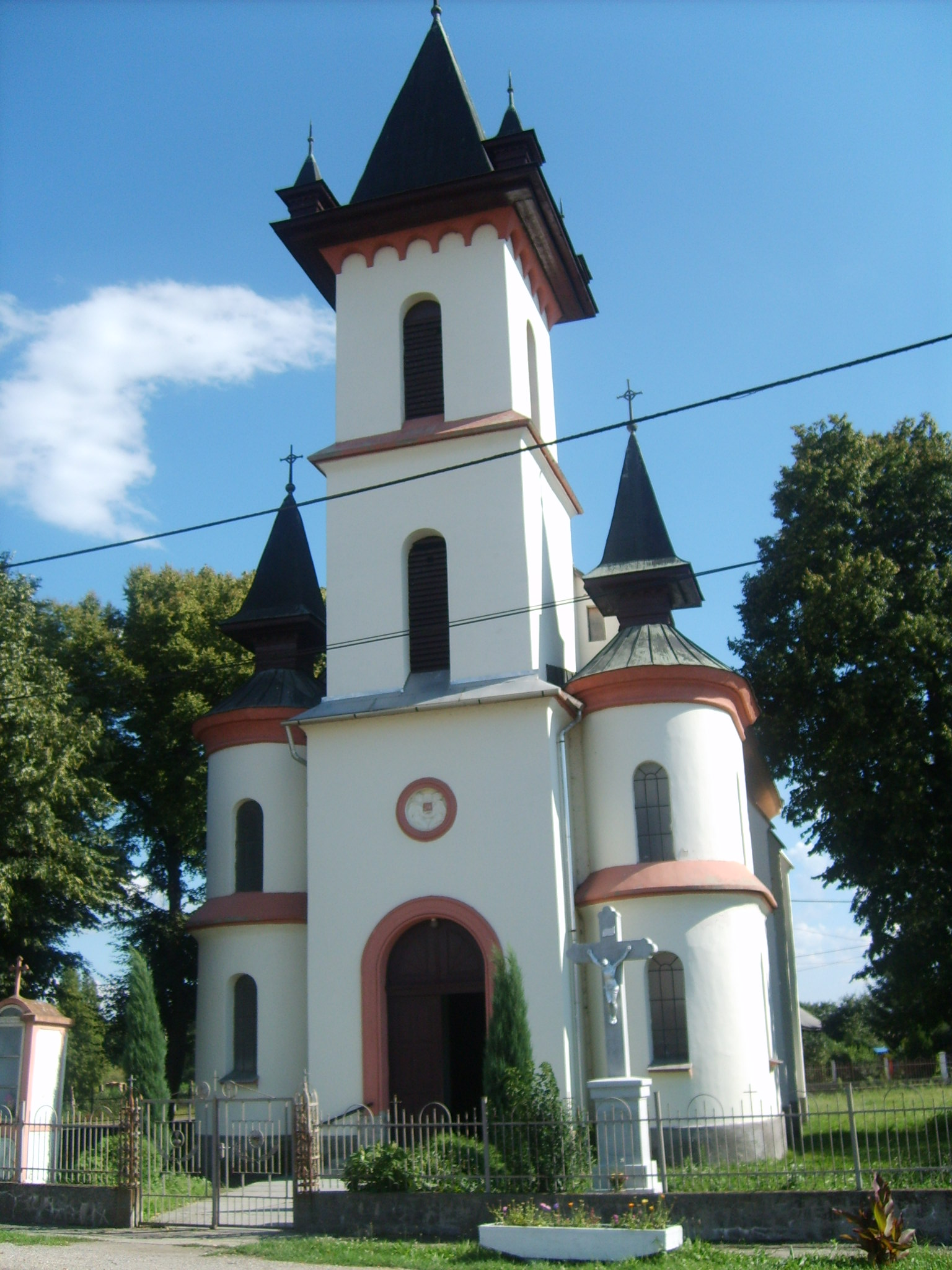

- Flag Coat of arms

- Location of Bánréve
- Coordinates: 48.29843°N 20.35496°E
- Country: Hungary
- Region: Northern Hungary
- County: Borsod-Abaúj-Zemplén
- District: Putnok

Area
  - Total: 6.62 km^{2} (2.56 sq mi)

Population (1 January 2025)
  - Total: 1,155
  - Density: 174/km^{2} (452/sq mi)
- Time zone: UTC+1 (CET)
  - Summer (DST): UTC+2 (CEST)
- Postal code: 3654
- Area code: 48

Bánréve is a village in Borsod-Abaúj-Zemplén county, Hungary.

In the 19th and 20th centuries, a small Jewish community lived in the village, in 1920 36 Jews lived in the village, most of whom were murdered in the Holocaust. The community had a Jewish cemetery.
