= Pastovce =

Municipality of Slovakia

Pastovce Ipolypásztó
- Municipality
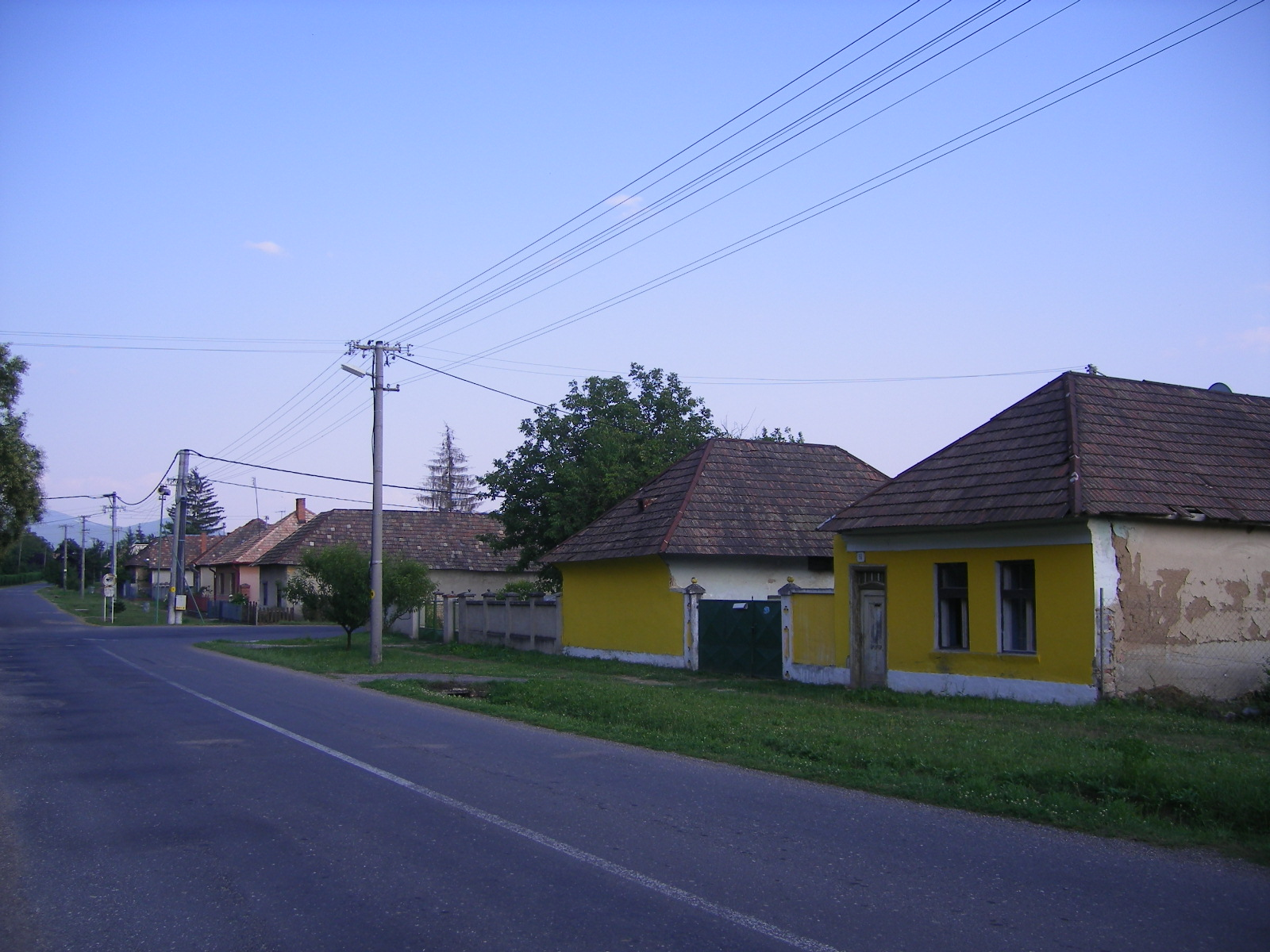

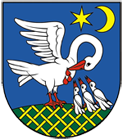
- Flag Coat of arms

- Location of Pastovce in the Nitra Region Location of Pastovce in Slovakia
- Coordinates: 47.97°N 18.77°E
- Country: Slovakia
- Region: Nitra Region
- District: Levice District
- First mentioned: 1135

Area
  - Total: 12.74 km^{2} (4.92 sq mi)
- Elevation: 120 m (390 ft)

Population (2025)
  - Total: 482
- Time zone: UTC+1 (CET)
  - Summer (DST): UTC+2 (CEST)
- Postal code: 935 74
- Area code: +421 36
- Vehicle registration plate (until 2022): LV
- Website: www.pastovce.sk

Pastovce (Hungarian: Ipolypásztó) is a village and municipality in the Levice District in the Nitra Region of Slovakia.

== History ==
In historical records the village was first mentioned in 1135.

== Geography ==
The municipality lies at an altitude of 120 metres (390 ft) and covers an area of 12.74 km^{2} (4.92 sq mi) (2025).

== Population ==
Population statistic (10 years)
Year	1995	2005	2015	2025
Count	552	549	503	482
Difference		−0.54%	−8.37%	−4.17%

Population statistic
Year	2024	2025
Count	479	482
Difference		+0.62%

It has a population of 482 people (31 December 2025).

=== Ethnicity ===
Census 2021 (1+ %)
Ethnicity	Number	Fraction
Hungarian	310	62.62%
Slovak	185	37.37%
Not found out	37	7.47%
Czech	8	1.61%
Romani	6	1.21%
Total	495	

In year 2021 was 495 people by ethnicity 310 as Hungarian, 185 as Slovak, 37 as Not found out, 8 as Czech, 6 as Romani, 2 as German and 1 as English.

Note on population: The difference values of population numbers in the table "Population statistic" and in the sections "Ethnicity" & "Religion" is caused by the use of various statistical methods.

=== Religion ===
Census 2021 (1+ %)
Religion	Number	Fraction
Roman Catholic Church	195	39.39%
None	138	27.88%
Calvinist Church	122	24.65%
Not found out	23	4.65%
Evangelical Church	9	1.82%
Christian Congregations in Slovakia	5	1.01%
Total	495	

In year 2021 was 495 people by religion 195 from Roman Catholic Church, 138 from None, 122 from Calvinist Church, 23 from Not found out, 9 from Evangelical Church, 5 from Christian Congregations in Slovakia, 1 from Jehovah's Witnesses, 1 from Other and 1 from Greek Catholic Church.

== Facilities ==
The village has a public library, swimming pool and football pitch.
