= Lenartovce =

Village and municipality in Slovakia

Lenartovce Sajólénártfalva
- Municipality
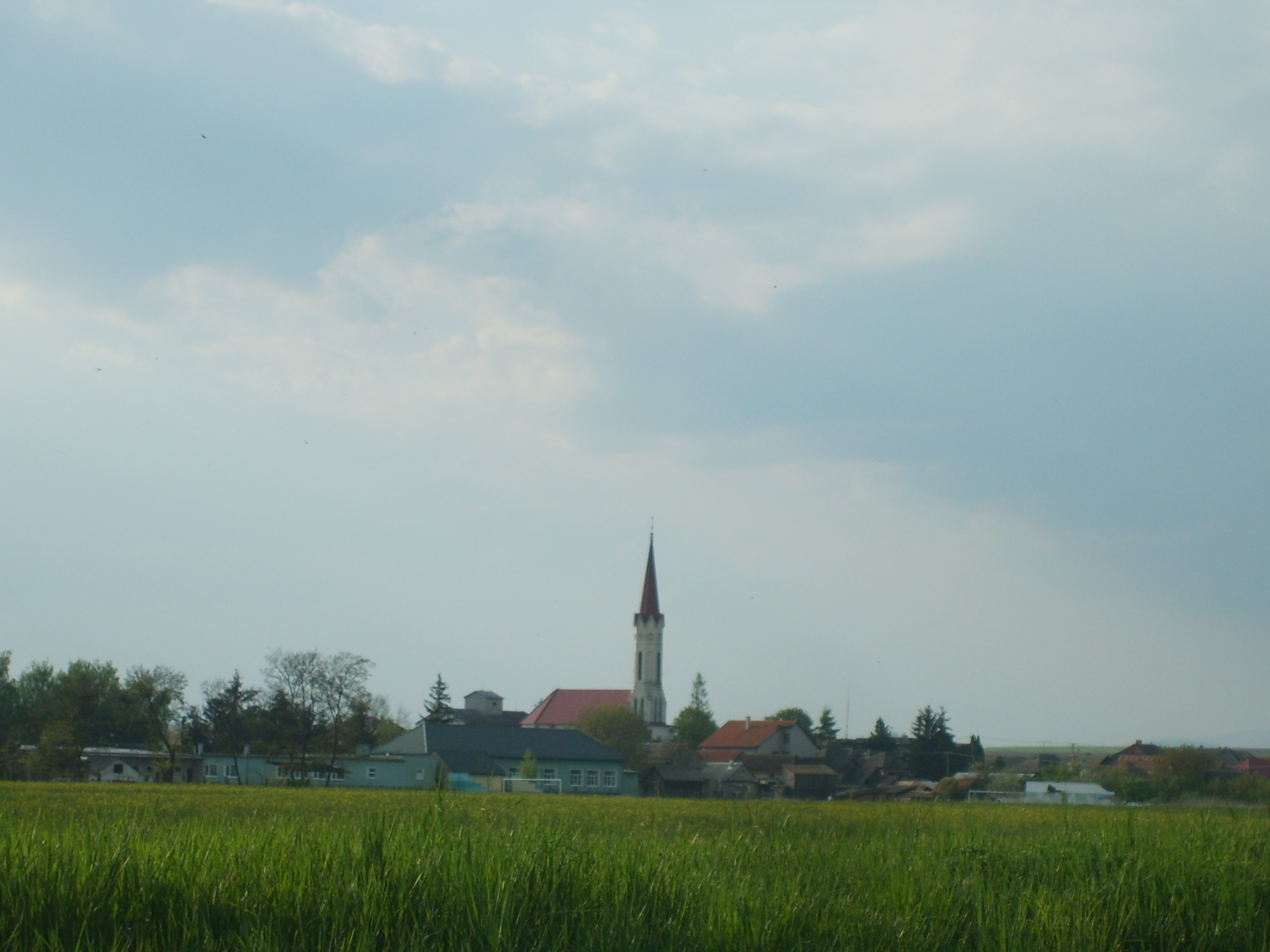

- Flag

- Location of Lenartovce in the Banská Bystrica Region Location of Lenartovce in Slovakia
- Coordinates: 48.30°N 20.32°E
- Country: Slovakia
- Region: Banská Bystrica Region
- District: Rimavská Sobota District
- First mentioned: 1364

Area
  - Total: 6.81 km^{2} (2.63 sq mi)
- Elevation: 155 m (509 ft)

Population (2025)
  - Total: 563
- Time zone: UTC+1 (CET)
  - Summer (DST): UTC+2 (CEST)
- Postal code: 980 44
- Area code: +421 47
- Vehicle registration plate (until 2022): RS
- Website: www.lenartovce.sk

Lenartovce (Hungarian: Sajólénártfalva) is a village and municipality in the Rimavská Sobota District of the Banská Bystrica Region of southern Slovakia. It has 546 inhabitants.

== Geography ==
The municipality lies at an altitude of 155 metres (509 ft) and covers an area of 6.81 km^{2} (2.63 sq mi) (2025).

== Population ==
Population statistic (10 years)
Year	1995	2005	2015	2025
Count	517	550	559	563
Difference		+6.38%	+1.63%	+0.71%

Population statistic
Year	2024	2025
Count	568	563
Difference		−0.88%

It has a population of 563 people (31 December 2025).

=== Ethnicity ===
Census 2021 (1+ %)
Ethnicity	Number	Fraction
Hungarian	507	93.54%
Romani	244	45.01%
Slovak	38	7.01%
Not found out	18	3.32%
Total	542	

In year 2021 was 542 people by ethnicity 507 as Hungarian, 244 as Romani, 38 as Slovak, 18 as Not found out and 1 as Czech.

Note on population: The difference values of population numbers in the table "Population statistic" and in the sections "Ethnicity" & "Religion" is caused by the use of various statistical methods.

=== Religion ===
Census 2021 (1+ %)
Religion	Number	Fraction
Roman Catholic Church	301	55.54%
Calvinist Church	166	30.63%
None	54	9.96%
Greek Catholic Church	11	2.03%
Not found out	6	1.11%
Total	542	

In year 2021 was 542 people by religion 301 from Roman Catholic Church, 166 from Calvinist Church, 54 from None, 11 from Greek Catholic Church, 6 from Not found out, 3 from Evangelical Church and 1 from Old Catholic Church.
