= Pribeník =

Pribeník Perbenyik
- Municipality
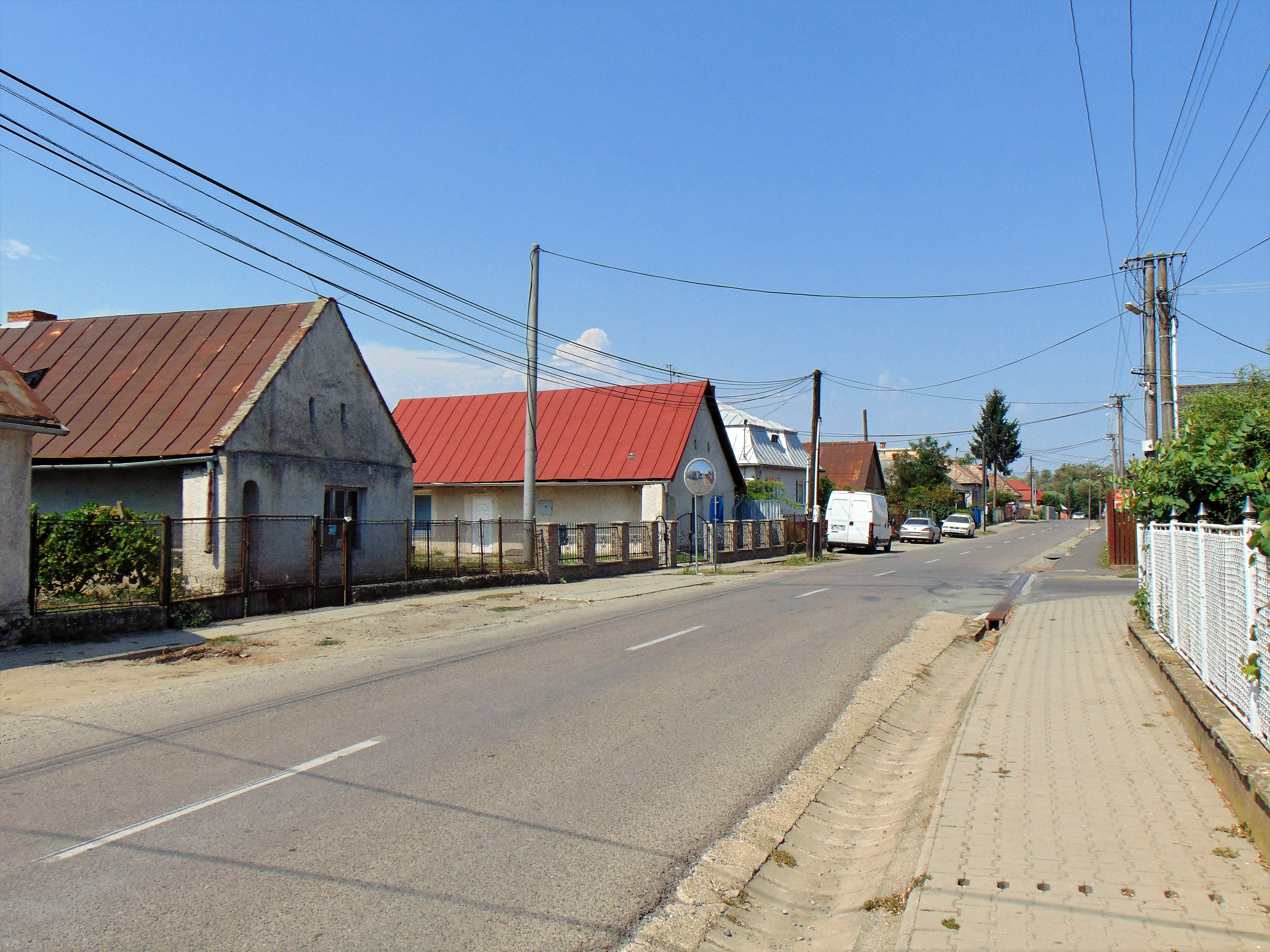

- Flag

- Location of Pribeník in the Košice Region Location of Pribeník in Slovakia
- Coordinates: 48.38°N 22.00°E
- Country: Slovakia
- Region: Košice Region
- District: Trebišov District
- First mentioned: 1323

Area
  - Total: 12.33 km^{2} (4.76 sq mi)
- Elevation: 100 m (330 ft)

Population (2025)
  - Total: 975
- Time zone: UTC+1 (CET)
  - Summer (DST): UTC+2 (CEST)
- Postal code: 765 1
- Area code: +421 56
- Vehicle registration plate (until 2022): TV
- Website: www.pribenik.sk

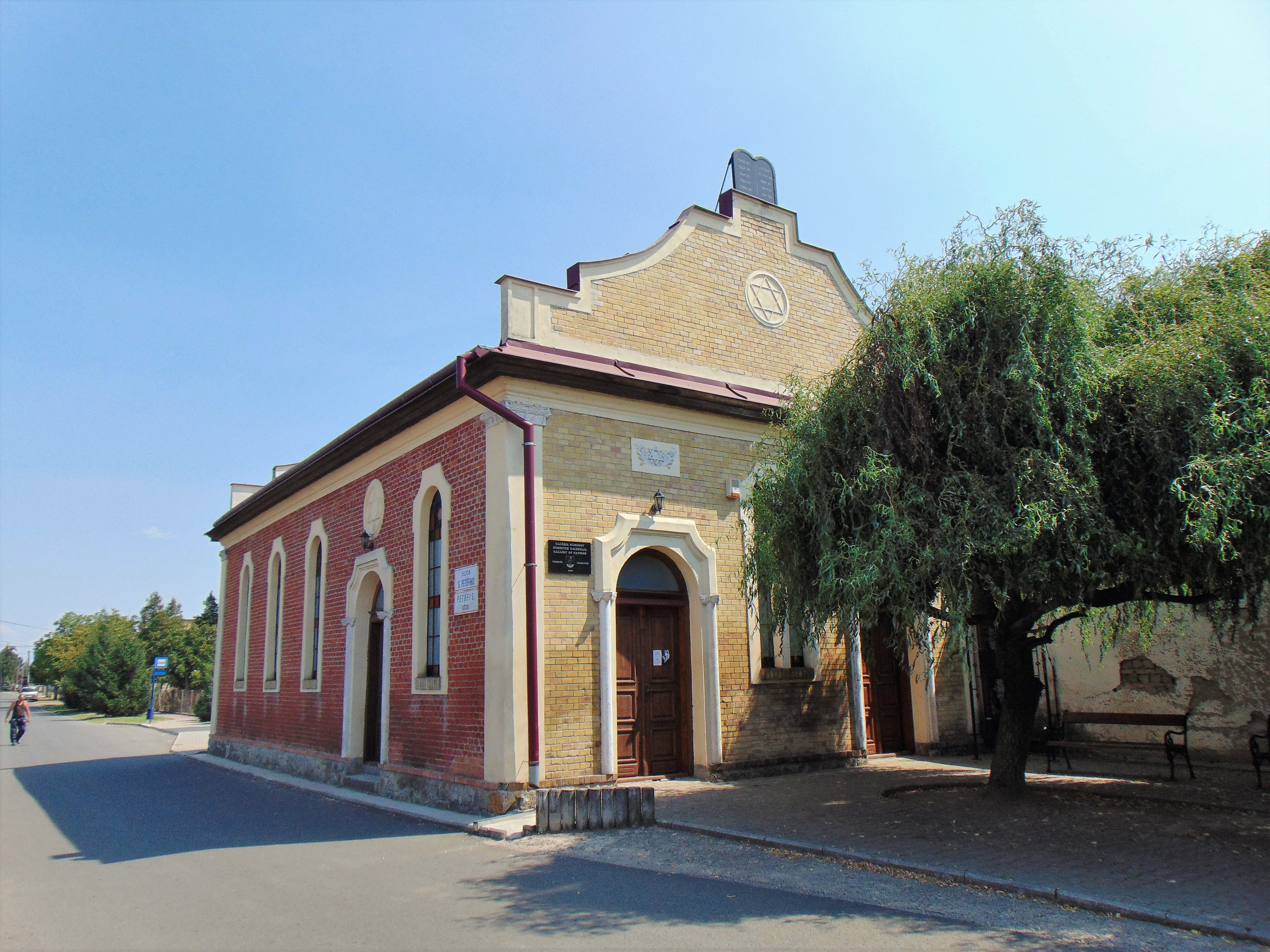
Former synagogue, now Gallery of Nations

Pribeník (Hungarian: Perbenyik) is a village and municipality in the Trebišov District in the Košice Region of south-eastern Slovakia.

== History ==
In historical records the village was first mentioned in 1323.

== Geography ==
The municipality lies at an altitude of 100 metres (330 ft) and covers an area of 12.33 km^{2} (4.76 sq mi) (2025).

== Population ==
Population statistic (10 years)
Year	1995	2005	2015	2025
Count	922	966	1006	975
Difference		+4.77%	+4.14%	−3.08%

Population statistic
Year	2024	2025
Count	970	975
Difference		+0.51%

It has a population of 975 people (31 December 2025).

=== Ethnicity ===
Census 2021 (1+ %)
Ethnicity	Number	Fraction
Hungarian	727	76.36%
Slovak	249	26.15%
Not found out	55	5.77%
Total	952	

In year 2021 was 952 people by ethnicity 727 as Hungarian, 249 as Slovak, 55 as Not found out, 3 as Czech, 2 as Rusyn, 2 as Other and 1 as Ukrainian.

Note on population: The difference values of population numbers in the table "Population statistic" and in the sections "Ethnicity" & "Religion" is caused by the use of various statistical methods.

=== Religion ===
Census 2021 (1+ %)
Religion	Number	Fraction
Calvinist Church	268	28.15%
Roman Catholic Church	261	27.42%
Greek Catholic Church	237	24.89%
Not found out	81	8.51%
None	80	8.4%
Evangelical Church	14	1.47%
Total	952	

In year 2021 was 952 people by religion 268 from Calvinist Church, 261 from Roman Catholic Church, 237 from Greek Catholic Church, 81 from Not found out, 80 from None, 14 from Evangelical Church, 5 from Jehovah's Witnesses, 3 from Christian Congregations in Slovakia, 2 from Eastern Orthodox Church and 1 from Other and not ascertained christian church.

== Facilities ==
The village has a public library and a football pitch.
