= List of rivers of Slovakia =

This is a list of the major rivers that flow through Slovakia and their lengths.

== Alphabetic list (selection) ==
River	Size		Notes
River	km	mi	Notes
Bebrava	47.2	29.3	
Belá	36.3	22.6	
Biela Orava	37	23	
Blava	47.5	29.5	
Blh	52.5	32.6	
Bodrog	123	76	out of which 15 km (9.3 mi) in Slovakia
Bodva	48.4	30.1	
Bystrica			several water flows bear this name
Chlmec	36.1	22.4	
Chvojnica	31.5	19.6	
Cirocha	50.6	31.4	
Čierna voda (Malý Dunaj)	105.5	65.6	
Čierna voda (Uh)	41	25	
Danube/Dunaj	2,850	1,770	out of which 172 km (107 mi) in Slovakia
Dudváh	97	60	
Dunajec	251	156	
Duša	41.1	25.5	
Gidra	40.5	25.2	
Gortva	33	21	
Handlovka	32	20	
Hnilec	88.9	55.2	
Hornád	193	120	out of which 19 km (12 mi) state border Slovakia–Hungary
Hron	298	185	
Ida	56.6	35.2	
Ipeľ	232.5	144.5	out of which 140 km (87 mi) state border Slovakia–Hungary
Krivánsky potok	35.4	22.0	
Krtíš	36.5	22.7	
Krupá			
Krupinica	65.4	40.6	
Kysuca	66.3	41.2	
Laborec	135	84	
Latorica	188	117	
Little Danube/Malý Dunaj	128	80	
Malina	47.2	29.3	
Morava	328.9	204.4	out of which 114 km (71 mi) state borders Slovakia-Czech Republic and Slovakia-Austria
Murán	48.8	30.3	
Myjava	79	49	
Nitra	197	122	
Nitrica	51.4	31.9	
Okna	37.3	23.2	
Olka	39.2	24.4	
Oľšava	49.9	31.0	
Ondava	146.5	91.0	
Ondavka	31	19	
Orava	60.3	37.5	
Paríž	41.5	25.8	
Perec	53.5	33.2	
Poprad	169	105	out of which 107 km (66 mi) in Slovakia and 62 km (39 mi) state border Slovakia - Poland
Radošinka	31.9	19.8	
Rajčanka	47.5	29.5	
Revúca	33.1	20.6	
Rimava	88	55	
Rimavica	32.5	20.2	
Rudava	45	28	
Sekcov	44.3	27.5	
Sikenica	46.2	28.7	
Slaná	229.4	142.5	out of which 110 km (68 mi) in Slovakia
Slatina	55.2	34.3	
Štiavnica	55	34	
Štítnik	32.8	20.4	
Stolicný potok	38.9	24.2	
Suchá	35.1	21.8	
Svinka	50.8	31.6	
Tisa	996	619	5.2 km (3.2 mi) state border Slovakia-Hungary
Tisovník	41	25	
Topľa	129.8	80.7	
Torysa	122.9	76.4	
Trnávka (Dudváh)	43	27	
Trnávka (Ondava)	37.1	23.1	
Tuhársky potok	31.9	19.8	
Turiec (Váh)	66.3	41.2	
Turiec (Sajó/Slaná)	50.2	31.2	
Turňa	32	20	
Udava	38.3	23.8	
Uzh/Uh	127	79	out of which 21.3 km (13.2 mi) in Slovakia
Váh	403	250	
Žitava	99.3	61.7	

== Ordered by rivers and their tributaries (selection) ==
ordered against the direction of the river flow; H stands for Hungary

- Danube/Dunaj
  - Tisa (mouth at Novi Sad, Serbia)
    - Slaná (at Tiszagyulaháza, H)
      - Hornád (at Ónod, H)
        - Torysa (at Nižná Hutka)
        - Hnilec (at Margecany)
      - Bodva (at Boldva, H)
        - Turňa (near Turňa nad Bodvou)
        - Ida (near Turňa nad Bodvou)
      - Rimava (at Vlkyňa)
      - Turiec (near Tornaľa)
      - Muráň (at Bretka)
    - Bodrog* (at Tokaj, H) [* the Bodrog arises through the confluence of the rivers Ondava and Latorica]
      - Roňava (at Sátoraljaújhely, H)
      - Ondava* (at Zemplín (village))
        - Topľa (at Tušice)
      - Latorica* (at Zemplín)
        - Laborec (at Zatín)
          - Uzh/Uh (at Drahňov)
          - Cirocha (at Humenné)
  - Ipeľ (at Szob, H)
    - Štiavnica (at Hrkovce)
    - Krupinica (at Šahy)
    - Krtíš (at Slovenské Ďarmoty)
    - Tisovník (at Muľa)
  - Hron (at Kamenica nad Hronom)
    - Slatina (at Zvolen)
    - Bystrica (at Banská Bystrica)
  - Váh (at Komárno)
    - Nitra (at Komárno)
      - Žitava (at Martovce)
      - Radosinka (at Lužianky)
      - Bebrava (at Práznovce)
    - Little Danube/Malý Dunaj (at Kolárovo)
      - Čierna Voda (at Veľký Ostrov near Komárno)
        - Dudváh (at Čierna Voda)
    - Dudváh (at Siladice)
    - Kysuca (at Žilina)
      - Bystrica (at Krásno nad Kysucou)
    - Rajčanka (at Žilina)
    - Turiec (at Martin)
    - Orava (at Kraľovany)
    - Revúca (at Ružomberok)
    - Belá (at Liptovský Hrádok)
    - Čierny Váh (at Kráľova Lehota)
    - Biely Váh (at Kráľova Lehota)
  - Morava (in Bratislava (city part Devín))
    - Myjava (at Kúty)
    - Chvojnica (near Holíč)
- Dunajec
  - Poprad (at Nowy Sącz, Poland)
