= Turiec River =

Turiec River may refer to:

- Turiec River (Váh)
- Turiec River (Sajó)
