= Handlovka =

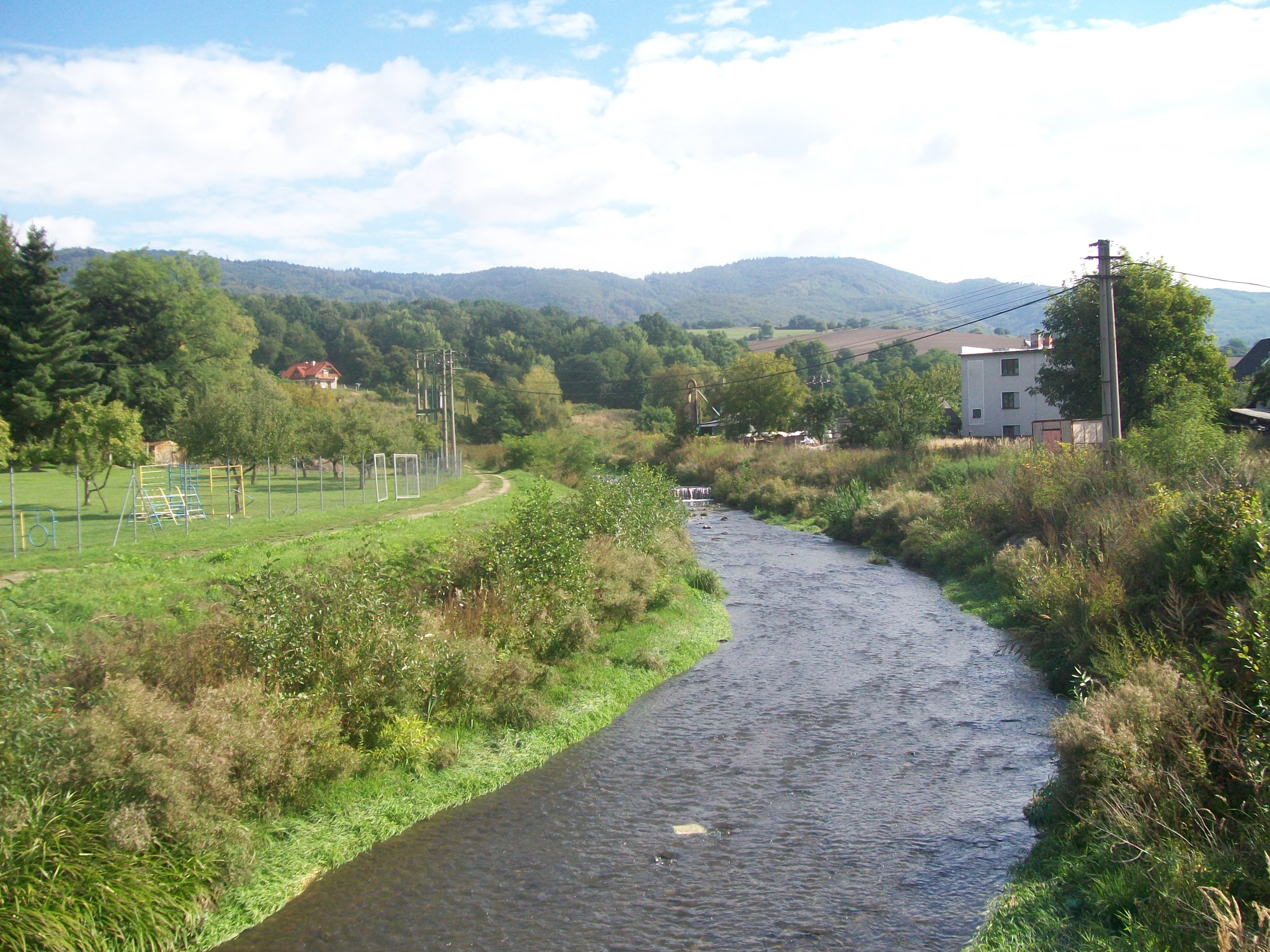

Location
- Country: Slovakia

Physical characteristics
- Source
  - location: Vtacnik Mountains
  - elevation: 770 m (2,530 ft)
- Mouth
  - location: Nitra
  - coordinates: 48.7347°N 18.5486°E
- Length: 30.5 km (19.0 mi)
- Basin size: 176 km^{2} (68 sq mi)

Basin features
- Progression: Nitra→ Váh→ Danube→ Black Sea

Handlovka is a river in central Slovakia (Prievidza District), left tributary of the Nitra river. It is 30.5 km (19.0 mi) long and its basin size is 176 km^{2} (68 sq mi). Its source is in the Vtacnik Mountains, near the Biely kameň. It is located at an elevation of 244 meters above sea level. Major cities and towns situated on the Handlovka are Handlová and Prievidza. The first name of the river was Prievidza. Handlovka is also known as Handlova, Handlovka, Handlová. An approximately regular course of groundwater storage curve was disconnected for the whole period from 1993 to 1997. Average groundwater storage is varying around 370 mm per month in winter months and around 200 mm per month in summer months.

== See also ==
- List of rivers of Slovakia
