= Chvojnica =

Chvojnica may refer to several places in the Trenčín Region of Slovakia:

- Chvojnica, Myjava District
- Chvojnica, Prievidza District
- Chvojnica (river)
