= Rimava =

Rimava Rima
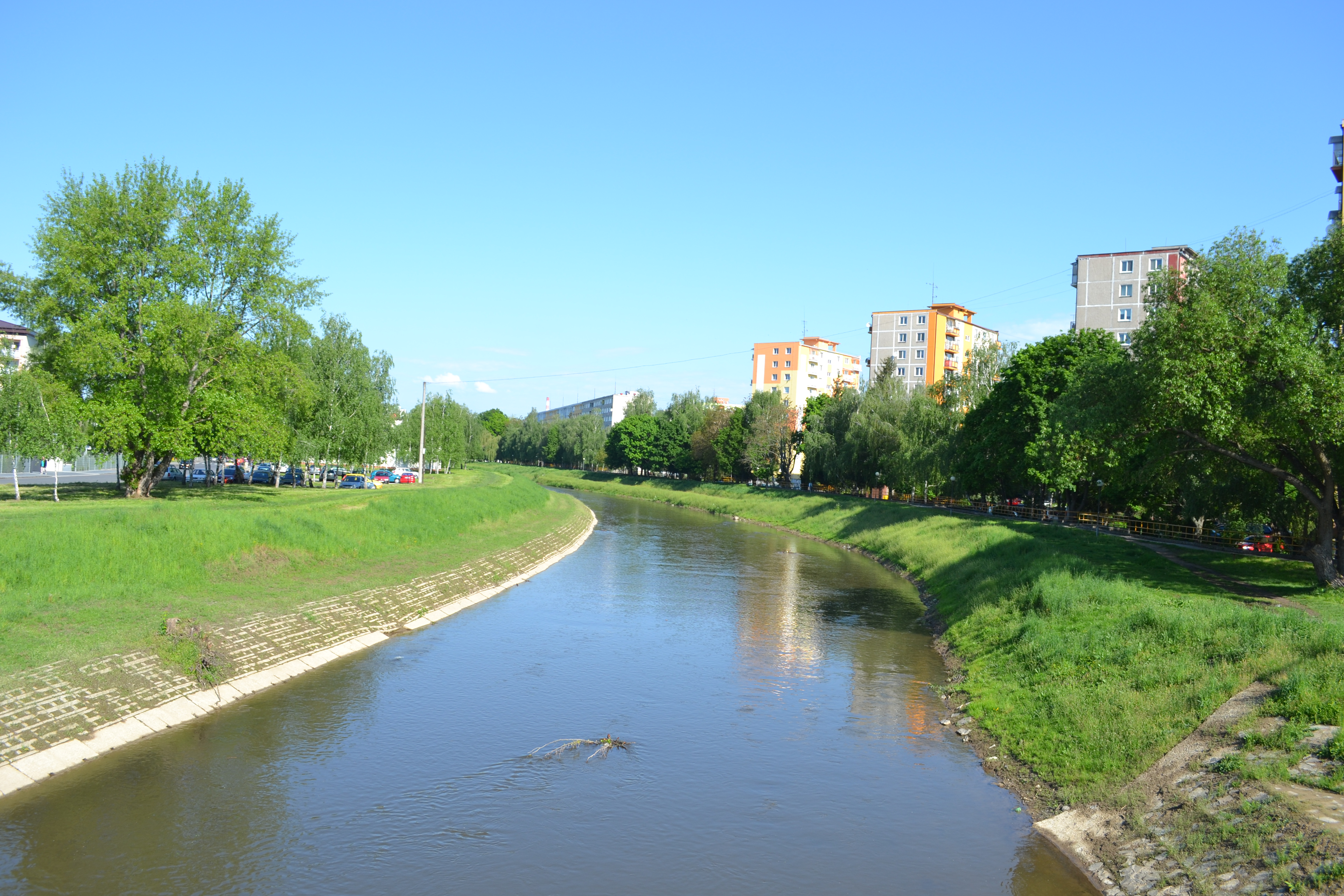

Location
- Country: Slovakia

Physical characteristics
- Source
  - location: Veporské vrchy
  - elevation: 1,130 m (3,710 ft)
- Mouth
  - location: Sajó
  - coordinates: 48.2876°N 20.3199°E
  - elevation: 145 m (476 ft)
- Length: 83 km (52 mi)
- Basin size: 1,378 km^{2} (532 sq mi)

Basin features
- Progression: Sajó→ Tisza→ Danube→ Black Sea

Rimava (Hungarian: Rima) is a river in southern central Slovakia, which flows only in the Rimavská Sobota District. It is a right tributary of the Slaná river. The Rimava is 83 km (52 mi) long and its basin size is 1,378 km^{2} (532 sq mi).

Its source is in Veporské vrchy at approximately 1,130 m (3,710 ft) above sea level. It flows through the towns of Tisovec, Hnúšťa and Rimavská Sobota before merging into the Slaná river near Vlkyňa at 145 m a.s.l.
