= Bánovce nad Bebravou =

- Municipality
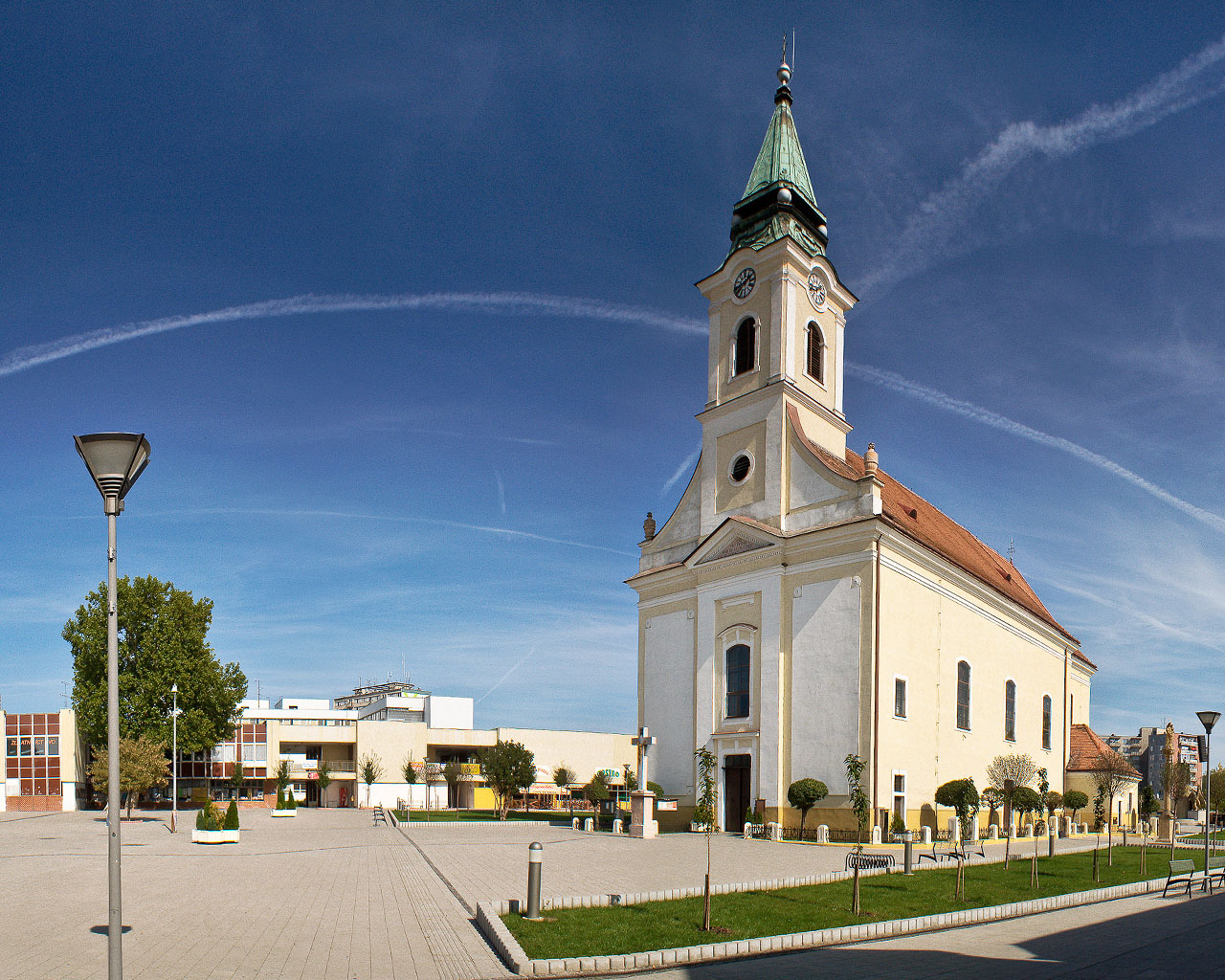

- Flag Coat of arms

- Location of Bánovce nad Bebravou in the Trenčín Region Location of Bánovce nad Bebravou in Slovakia
- Coordinates: 48.72°N 18.26°E
- Country: Slovakia
- Region: Trenčín Region
- District: Bánovce nad Bebravou District
- First mentioned: 1232

Government
  - Mayor: Rudolfa Novotná

Area
  - Total: 26.45 km^{2} (10.21 sq mi)
- Elevation: 209 m (686 ft)

Population (2025)
  - Total: 15,872
- Time zone: UTC+1 (CET)
  - Summer (DST): UTC+2 (CEST)
- Postal code: 957 01
- Area code: +421 38
- Vehicle registration plate (until 2022): BN
- Website: www.banovce.sk

Bánovce nad Bebravou (Slovak pronunciation: [baːnɔvt͡se natbebravɔu]; German: Banowitz, Hungarian: Bán) is a town in Slovakia, in the Trenčín Region.

== Names ==
The name is derived from the personal name or title Bán meaning "the village of Bán's people". "Nad Bebravou" means "above Bebrava" (beaver river). The oldest inscription mentioning the town as villa Ben dates back to 1232. Other recorded names are Villa Ban (1318), Banowitz (1389), oppidum Banowcz (1439), Ban (1467), Banowcze (1471).

== Geography ==
The municipality lies at an altitude of 209 metres (686 ft) and covers an area of 26.45 km^{2} (10.21 sq mi) (2025).

It is located at the northernmost edge of the Danubian Hills, at the foothills of the Strážovské vrchy mountains at the confluence of the Radiša and Bebrava rivers. It is 25 km away from Prievidza, 30 km from Trenčín and 50 km from Nitra.

== History ==
The oldest settlement stems from the Bronze Age. The town was promoted in 1376 into free royal town (until 1389, then landlord township). In the Middle Ages, Bánovce became an important trade centre - for shoemakers, carpenters, smiths, butchers, weavers and others. In 1633, the Ottomans encroaching from the south plundered the town. The first elementary school was opened in the 17th century. During the first Czechoslovak republic, it was an agricultural-crafting town. During World War II, the town was taken by Romanian troops of the 1st Army on 5 April 1945. After World War II, automobile, furniture and textile industries developed.

== Population ==
Population statistic (10 years)
Year	1995	2005	2015	2025
Count	20,786	20,639	18,823	15,872
Difference		−0.70%	−8.79%	−15.67%

Population statistic
Year	2024	2025
Count	16,103	15,872
Difference		−1.43%

It has a population of 15,872 people (31 December 2025).

== Places of interest ==
- Saint Nicholas Church - an originally Gothic church from the 15th century
- Holy Trinity Church
- Synagogue - now used as a Lutheran church
- Country castle in the Horné Ozorovce borough

In total, there are 15 cultural memorials in the town and its boroughs inscribed in the central inventory of cultural memorials in Bratislava.

The Bánovská Parenica (the most famous cycling race in the region) is regularly organized every year on the 6th of September and goes through this village. The competition is available for a high range of cyclists. It starts in the town of Bánovce nad Bebravou and is organized by the regional club of tourists Klub slovenských turistov and JPL.

== Demographics ==
Historical population
Year	Pop.	±%
1970	9,496	—
1980	15,342	+61.6%
1991	19,893	+29.7%
2001	20,901	+5.1%
2011	19,564	−6.4%
2021	17,311	−11.5%
Source: Censuses

According to the 2001 census, the town had 20,901 inhabitants. 97% of inhabitants were Slovaks, 1.4% Roma and 0.7% Czechs. The religious makeup was 73.9% Roman Catholics, 11.5% people with no religious affiliation, and 11.3% Lutherans.

== Boroughs ==
The city consists of the following boroughs:

1. Bánovce nad Bebravou
2. Biskupice
3. Dolné Ozorovce
4. Horné Ozorovce
5. Malé Chlievany

== Famous people ==
- Jozef Forgáč (1904 – 1966), SDB, Roman Catholic priest end Missionary (Chile, Argentina).

== Twin towns — sister cities ==
Bánovce nad Bebravou is twinned with:

- Kopřivnice, Czech Republic
- Milotice, Czech Republic
- Lubliniec, Poland
- Esztergom, Hungary

== Genealogical resources ==
The records for genealogical research are available at the state archive in Nitra (Slovak: Štátny archív v Nitre).

- Roman Catholic church records (births/marriages/deaths): 1700-1895 (parish A)

== See also ==
- List of municipalities and towns in Slovakia
