= Modrý Kameň =

Modrý Kameň Kékkő
- Municipality
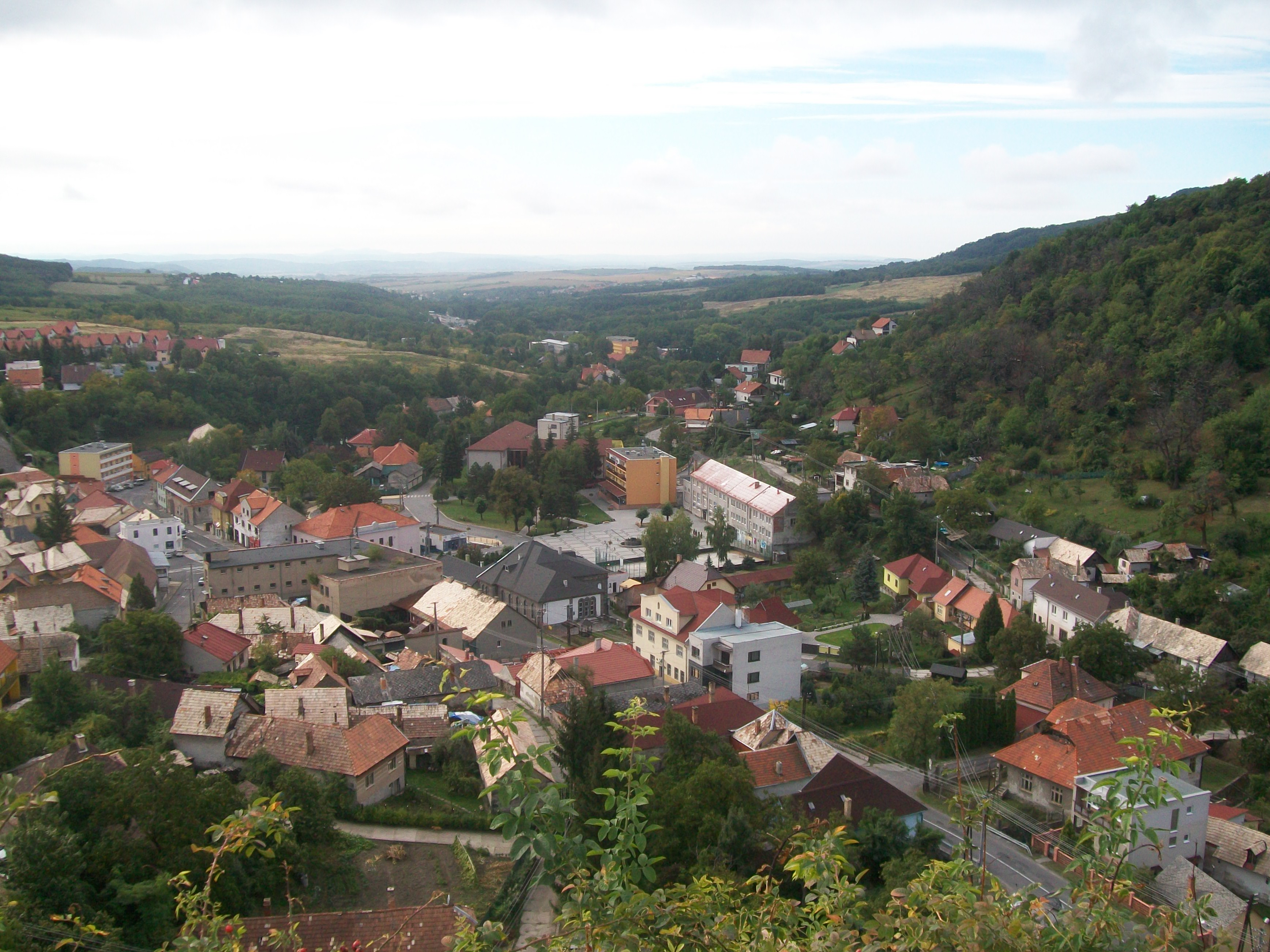
- View of the town from the castle

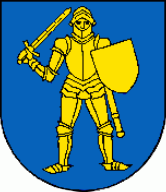
- Flag Coat of arms

- Location of Modrý Kameň in the Banská Bystrica Region Location of Modrý Kameň in Slovakia
- Coordinates: 48.24°N 19.33°E
- Country: Slovakia
- Region: Banská Bystrica Region
- District: Veľký Krtíš District
- First mentioned: 1290

Government
  - Mayor: Mária Bednárová

Area
  - Total: 19.62 km^{2} (7.58 sq mi)
- Elevation: 250 m (820 ft)

Population (2025)
  - Total: 1,634
- Time zone: UTC+1 (CET)
  - Summer (DST): UTC+2 (CEST)
- Postal code: 992 01
- Area code: +421 47
- Vehicle registration plate (until 2022): VK
- Website: www.modrykamen.sk

Modrý Kameň (lit. "Blue Stone"; German: Blauenstein; Hungarian: Kékkő) is a town and municipality in the Veľký Krtíš District of the Banská Bystrica Region of southern Slovakia.

== Geography ==
The municipality lies at an altitude of 250 metres (820 ft) and covers an area of 19.62 km^{2} (7.58 sq mi) (2025).

It is located on the Krupina Plain (Slovak: Krupinská planina) on the Krtíš and Riečka rivers. It is around 5 km from Veľký Krtíš and 50 km from Zvolen.

== History ==
The name of the town was first mentioned as Keykkw in 1290. The name of the settlement means "Blue Rock". Ruins of the castle Modrý Kameň stand on a rock pinnacle above the town. The castle was built in the second half of the 13th century by the ancestors of the Balassa noble family. They had to recapture the castle from the sons of Casimir of the Hont-Pázmány clan by a siege in 1290. The castle was captured by Ottoman troops in 1576, because its guard fled when they heard the approaching Ottomans. The castle was given up and subsequently destroyed by Ottoman troops in 1593. It was restored between 1609 and 1612 by Sigismund Balassa. The castle was ravaged many times during the 17th century, so it became ruined and abandoned. The Balassa family built a new Baroque mansion house on the side of the castle hill in the early 18th century; stones of the former castle were used in the mansion building operations. The last member of the Balassa noble family died in 1899. After the demise of the Balassa family, the Almásy noble family became the proprietors of Modrý Kameň castle. They sold the demesne to the Czechoslovak state in 1923.

In 1910 the settlement had a population of 1,347, consisting mostly of Slovak inhabitants, though a significant Hungarian minority lived in Modrý Kameň as well. Modrý Kameň belonged to Nógrád (Novohrad) county until the end of World War I. The settlement was the center of the Modrý Kameň district (Slovak: okres Modrý Kameň, Hungarian: Kékkői járás) between 1912 and 1960. An electric network was built in 1943.

During World War II, an illegal antifascist communist organization operated in the settlement. During the Slovak National Uprising, Modrý Kameň was the center of the national revolutionary committee of the district, and partisan groups operated on the outskirts.

Modrý Kameň was pronounced a town in 1969.

== Population ==
Historical population
Year	Pop.	±%
1970	1,793	—
1980	1,586	−11.5%
1991	1,374	−13.4%
2001	1,434	+4.4%
2011	1,555	+8.4%
2021	1,620	+4.2%
Source: Censuses

Population statistic (10 years)
Year	1995	2005	2015	2025
Count	1416	1457	1600	1634
Difference		+2.89%	+9.81%	+2.12%

Population statistic
Year	2024	2025
Count	1630	1634
Difference		+0.24%

It has a population of 1634 people (31 December 2025).

=== Ethnicity ===
Census 2021 (1+ %)
Ethnicity	Number	Fraction
Slovak	1523	94.01%
Not found out	69	4.25%
Hungarian	32	1.97%
Romani	25	1.54%
Total	1620	

In year 2021 was 1620 people by ethnicity 1523 as Slovak, 69 as Not found out, 32 as Hungarian, 25 as Romani, 11 as Czech, 4 as Canadian, 3 as Italian, 2 as Other, 1 as Rusyn, 1 as Russian, 1 as Polish, 1 as German and 1 as English.

Note on population: The difference values of population numbers in the table "Population statistic" and in the sections "Ethnicity" & "Religion" is caused by the use of various statistical methods.

=== Religion ===
Census 2021 (1+ %)
Religion	Number	Fraction
Roman Catholic Church	1073	66.23%
None	313	19.32%
Evangelical Church	117	7.22%
Not found out	64	3.95%
Total	1620	

In year 2021 was 1620 people by religion 1073 from Roman Catholic Church, 313 from None, 117 from Evangelical Church, 64 from Not found out, 15 from Greek Catholic Church, 13 from Ad hoc movements, 7 from Other, 4 from Christian Congregations in Slovakia, 2 from Calvinist Church, 2 from Eastern Orthodox Church, 2 from Paganism and natural spirituality, 2 from Baptists Church, 1 from Old Catholic Church, 1 from Other and not ascertained christian church, 1 from Jehovah's Witnesses, 1 from Hinduism, 1 from Seventh-day Adventist Church and 1 from Buddhism.

== Sights ==
- A Roman Catholic church was built in 1879
- A Baroque chapel of St Anna was built in 1759
- Modrý kameň Castle Museum (Marionette and toy museum, Valentine Balassi poet's life and work, Ethnographic exhibition of the region, A look at the history of dental technology and stomatology)

== Twin towns – sister cities ==
Modrý Kameň is twinned with:

- Bercel, Hungary

== Gallery ==
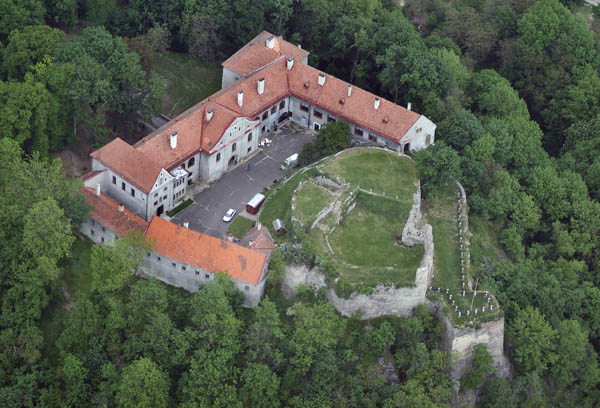
Aerial photo of the castle

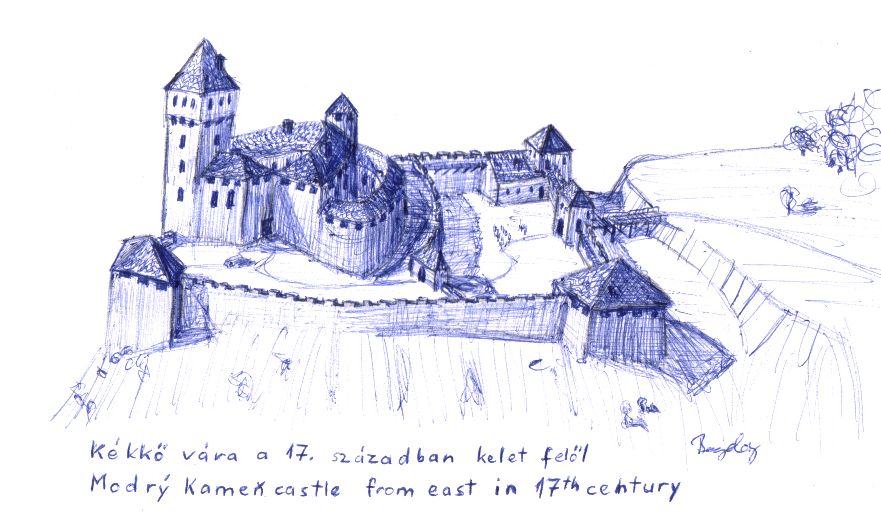
Modrý Kameň Castle in the 17th century
