= Bebrava =

Location
- Country: Slovakia

Physical characteristics
- Mouth: Nitra
  - location: Topoľčany
  - coordinates: 48.5704°N 18.2092°E
- Length: 46.7 km (29.0 mi)
- Basin size: 631 km^{2} (244 sq mi)

Basin features
- Progression: Nitra→ Váh→ Danube→ Black Sea

The Bebrava is a river in western Slovakia. It rises in the Strážovské vrchy mountains near the village of Čierna Lehota, flowing at first south-west, turning after some 10 km into south, flowing through Bánovce nad Bebravou, finally pouring into the river Nitra near Topoľčany. It is 47 km (29 mi) long and its basin size is 631 km^{2} (244 sq mi).
