= Nitra (river) =

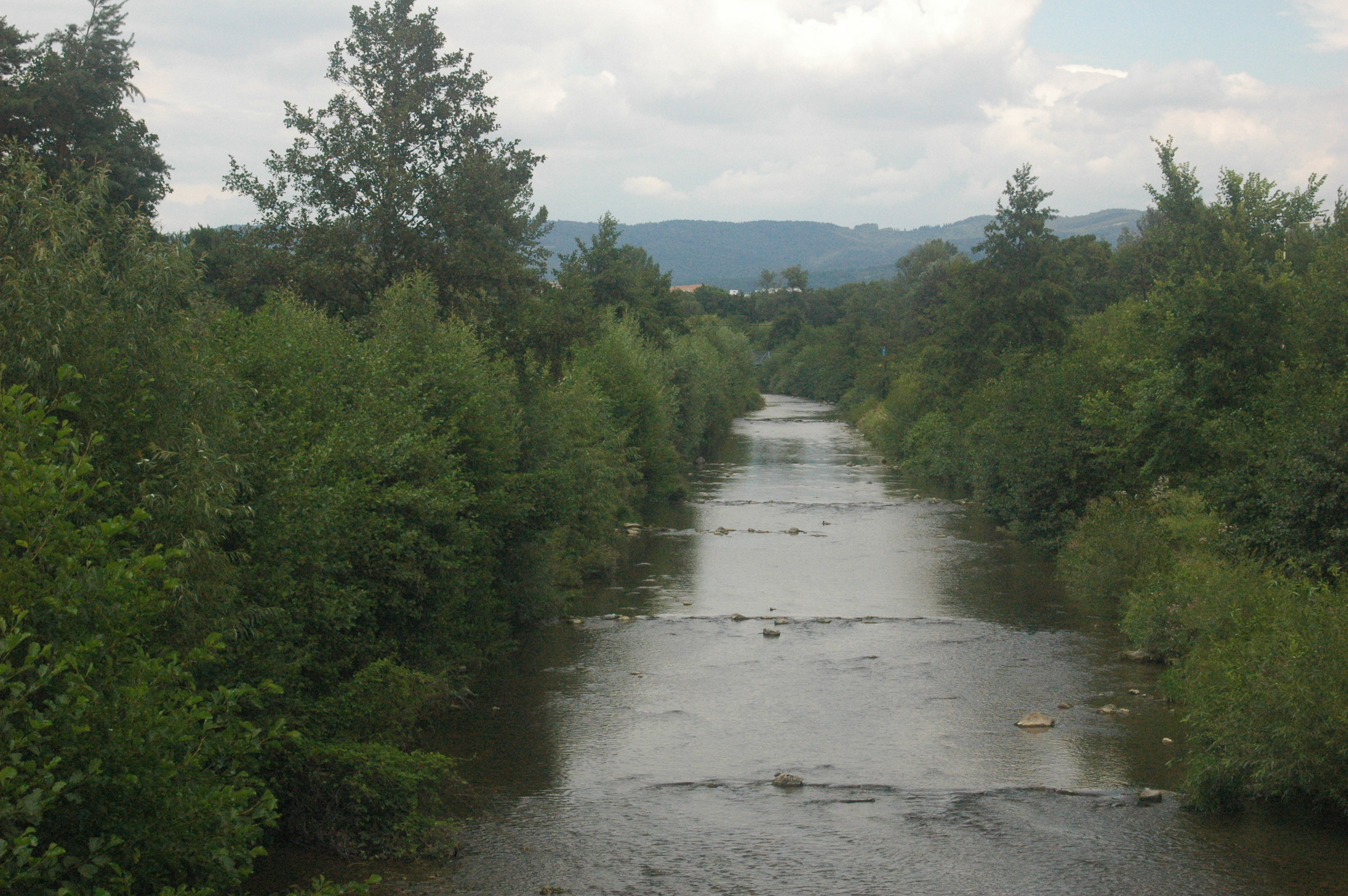
- Nitra in Prievidza

Physical characteristics
- Source
  - location: Malá Fatra
- Mouth: Váh
  - location: Komoča
  - coordinates: 47.9577°N 18.0194°E
- Length: 166 km (103 mi)
- Basin size: 4,501 km^{2} (1,738 sq mi)

Basin features
- Progression: Váh→ Danube→ Black Sea
- Tributaries
  - left: Žitava, Handlovka
  - right: Bebrava

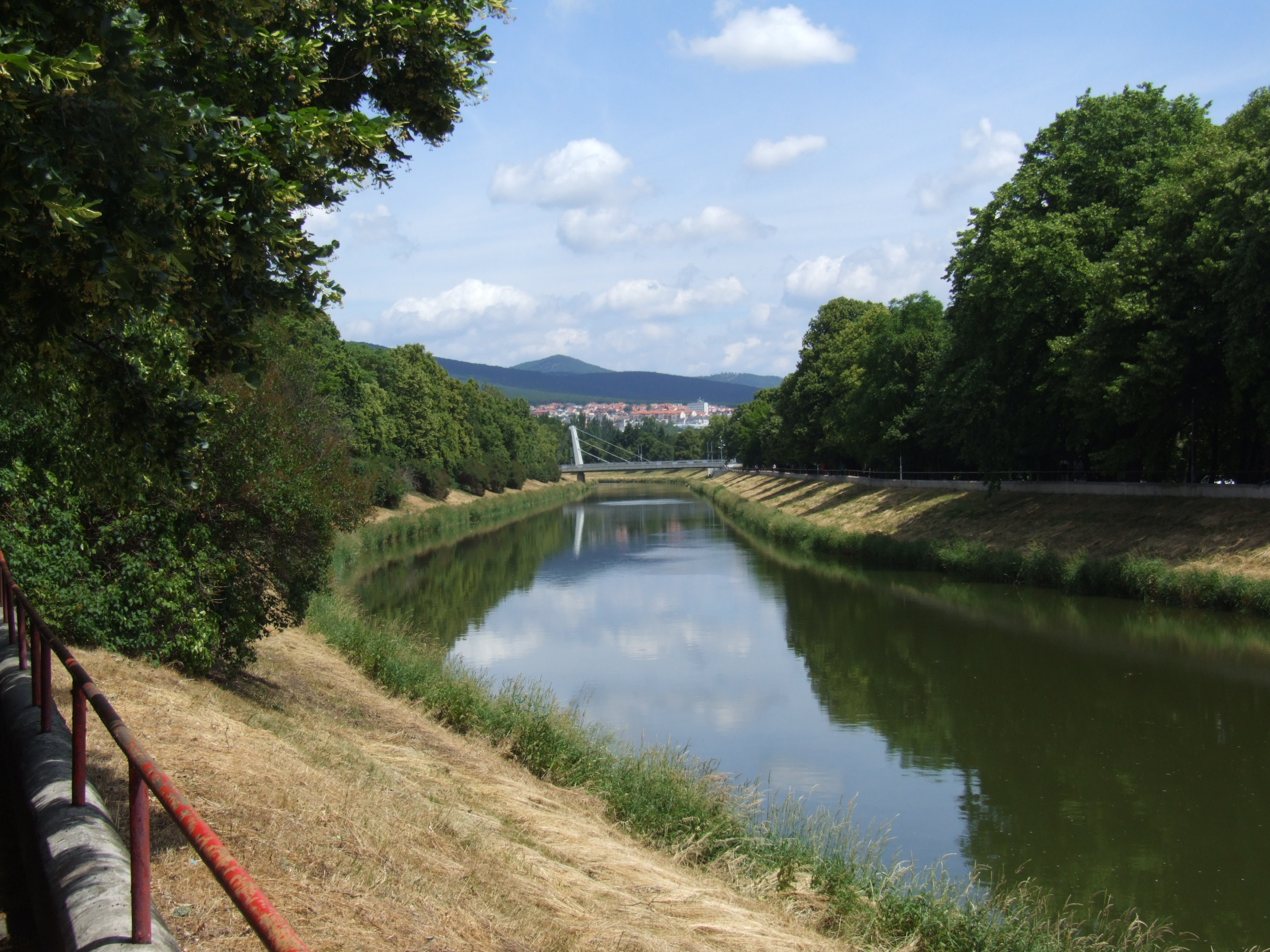
Nitra in Nitra

The Nitra (Slovak: Nitra,; German: Neutra, Hungarian: Nyitra) is a river in western Slovakia. It flows into the Váh river in Komoča. Its source is in the Malá Fatra (Lesser Fatra) mountains north of Prievidza. The river Nitra passes through the towns of Bojnice, Topoľčany, Nitra and Nové Zámky. It is 166 km (103 mi) long and its basin size is 4,501 km^{2} (1,738 sq mi). The old branch of the Nitra, Stará Nitra, branches off near Nové Zámky and flows into the Váh close to its confluence with the Danube in Komárno.
