= Sajó =

Slaná Sajó
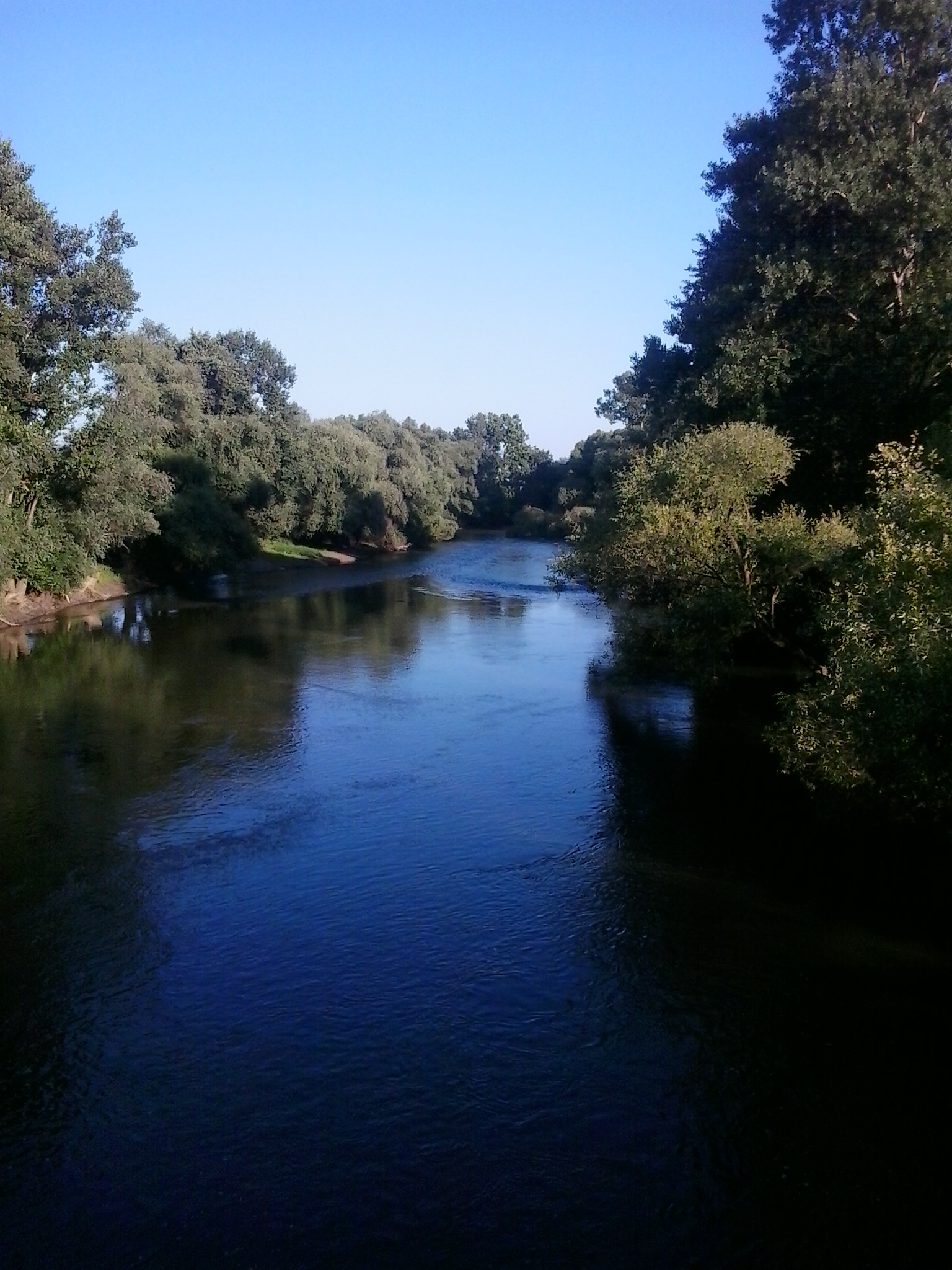
- The river between Sajóvámos and Szirmabesenyő

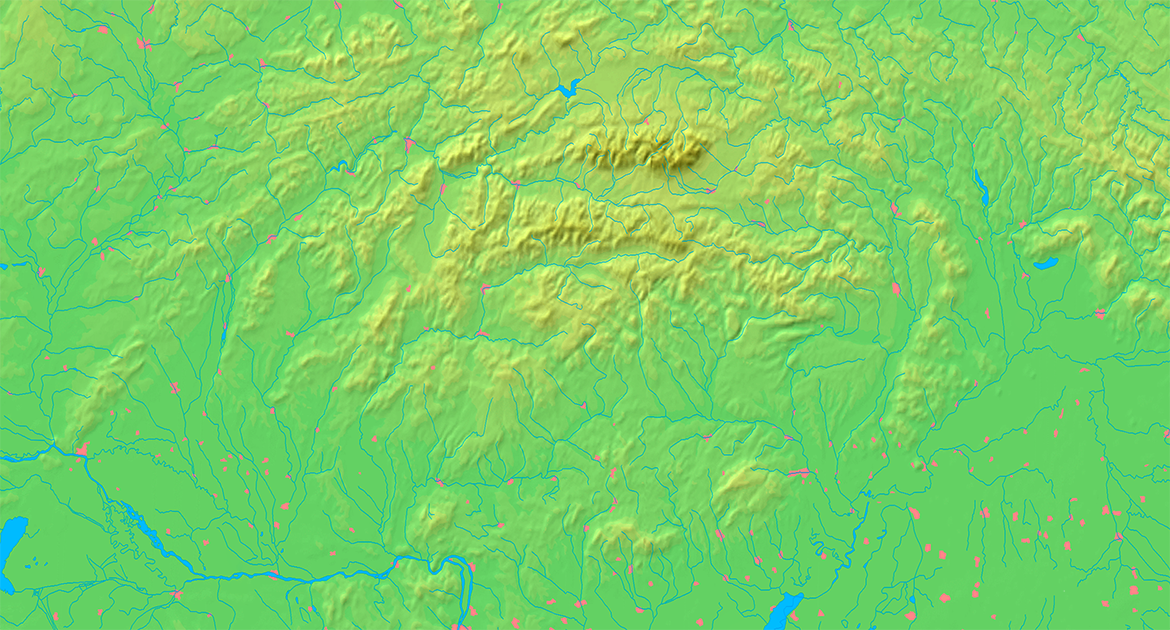
- Current and watershed of the Sajó River in Slovakia and Hungary

Location
- Countries: Slovakia and Hungary

Physical characteristics
- Source
  - location: Stolica Mountains
  - coordinates: 48°46′34.4388″N 20°12′34.6464″E
  - elevation: 1,229 m (4,032 ft)
- Mouth
  - location: Tisza
  - coordinates: 47.9437°N 21.1142°E
  - elevation: 91 m (299 ft)
- Length: 229.4 km (142.5 mi)
- Basin size: 12,708.3 km^{2} (4,906.7 mi^{2}) to 12,869.6 km^{2} (4,969.0 mi^{2})
- Discharge
  - location: Tiszaújváros, Hungary (near mouth)
  - average: 65.6 m^{3}/s (2,320 cu ft/s) to 78.623 m^{3}/s (2,776.5 cu ft/s)
- Discharge
  - location: Miskolc (53.205 rkm; Basin size: 6,245.8 km^{2} (2,411.5 sq mi)
  - average: 35.087 m^{3}/s (1,239.1 cu ft/s)
- Discharge
  - location: Kazincbarcika (88.4 rkm; Basin size: 4,361 km^{2} (1,684 sq mi)
  - average: 24.473 m^{3}/s (864.3 cu ft/s)
- Discharge
  - location: Bánréve, Sajópüspöki (123.6 rkm; Basin size: 3,204.7 km^{2} (1,237.3 sq mi)
  - average: 20.55 m^{3}/s (726 cu ft/s)
- Discharge
  - location: Rožňava, 177.5 rkm; Basin size: 301.53 km^{2} (116.42 sq mi)
  - average: 3.264 m^{3}/s (115.3 cu ft/s)

Basin features
- Progression: Tisza→ Danube→ Black Sea
- Tributaries
  - left: Takta, Hernád, Bódva, Szuha
  - right: Szinva, Bán-patak, Hangony, Rimava, Turiec, Muráň, Štítnik

The Sajó, or Slaná in Slovak, is a river in Slovakia and Hungary.

Its length is 229 km, of which 110 km is in Slovakia. Its source is in the Stolica Mountains range of the Slovak Ore Mountains. It flows through the Slovak town Rožňava and the Hungarian city Miskolc. In Hungary, Slaná flows through the county of Borsod-Abaúj-Zemplén. It flows into the River Tisza near Tiszaújváros. Its main tributaries are the Bodva and the Hornád. It is also known for the Battle of Mohi, near Muhi (then Mohi), from 11 April 1241 between the Mongol Empire and the Kingdom of Hungary.

== Geography ==
Catchment area of the Slaná river by country:

River	Area by country			
River	Slovakia		Hungary	
River	(km^{2})	(%)	(km^{2})	(%)
Slaná	3,217	25.3	2,328	18.3
Bodva	858	6.8	869	6.8
Hornád	4,423	34.8	1,013	8.0
	8,498	66.9	4,210	33.1
Slaná River Basin	12,708 km^{2}			100.0%

Important hydrological stations along the Slaná river:

Station	River kilo-meter (rkm)	Altitude (m)	Basin size (km^{2})	Average discharge (m^{3}/s)
Hungary
Tiszaújváros (near mouth)	0.0	91	12,869.6	78.623
Kesznyéten	10.5	94	12,131.9	75.582
Ónod	34	104	6,691	36.701
Felsőzsolca	50.9	114	6,591.9	36.276
Miskolc	53.9	116	6,591.9	36.146
Kazincbarcika	88.4	135	4,361	24.473
Sajópüspöki, Bánréve	123.6	155	3,204.7	20.55
Slovakia
Lenartovce	127.2	157	1,829.65	14.5
Bretka	149.8	193	889.12	6.075
Rožňava	175.5	276.6	301.53	3.264
Gemerská Poloma	184.3	320.9	201.6	2.622
Vlachovo	198.6	412	123.16	2.051
Vyšná Slaná	201.3	440.9	60.28	0.696

== Tributaries ==
Complete list of streams (slovak 'potok'; Hungarian 'patak') and rivers flowing into the Slaná (from the estuary upwards):

Left tributary	Right tributary	Length (km)	Basin size (km^{2})	Average discharge (m^{3}/s)
Hungary
Inér-háti-főcsatorna		10.2	55	0.089
Takta		63.8	620.6	2.951
	Hejő-Szarda-övcsatorna			
Hornád		282.2	5,436.4	38.555
Kis-Sajó		20.9	85.8	0.16
	Szinva	18.5	159.4	0.733
	Bábony-patak	9.5	26.9	0.122
Bódva		110.7	1,727.3	9.983
	Harica	20.1	86.1	0.292
	Alacska-patak	6.6	10	0.049
Szuha		40	211.6	0.982
	Tardona-patak	18.9	47.2	0.206
	Bán-patak	23.9	260.3	0.893
Galgóc-patak		3.1		
Zsuponyó-patak		7.5	17	0.094
Szörnyűvölgyi-patak		6	10.3	0.051
	Mercse-patak	10.6	30.1	0.16
	Hangony	30.9	295.2	1.033
Keleméri-patak		15.6	60.3	0.19
Slovakia
	Rimava	88	1,368.6	7.912
	Lúčka	7.2		
Neporadzský potok		8.2		0.091
Konský potok		10		0.139
	Kaloša	15.1	146.6	0.27
Hubovský potok		9.2		
	Turiec	46.2	370.5	2.072
Chinča		9.8		0.111
	Gemerský potok	3.8		
Lapša		9.5		
	Muráň	48.8	413.2	3.118
Sograd'		8.3		0.064
Androvský potok		3.4		0.167
	Mlynský			
	Štítnik	32.8	229.6	1.715
	Egressy potok	4.2		
Čremošná		29	142	0.968
	Honský potok	12.8	26.23	0.189
Rožňavský potok		13.34	42.3	0.332
Betliarsky potok		7.9		0.124
Capašsky potok		5.3		
Súl'ovský potok		14.2	57.66	0.462
	Kolesárský potok	6.2		
Dolinský potok				
Lučica		4.9		
	Henckovský potok	3		
	Pališov potok	2.9		
	Kobeliarovský potok	6.76	15.65	0.138
	Gampel'ský potok	3.4		
Gočovský potok		2.9		
Vlachovský potok		5.3		
Dobšinský potok		15.5	57.32	0.578
	Žoltkovský potok	6.5		
	Potôčik			
	Mlynná			
Krokovský potok		1.9		
	Rovniansky potok	5.5		
Skalný potok				
Trsteník		3.5		

== Etymology ==
The origin of the name is the subject of scholarly discussions. Hungarian linguists and historians suggested the derivation from the Hungarian sojó, só folyó (salt water, river) already in the 19th century. Newer theories associate the name with sió referring to fast streams. According to Slovak linguists, the name is pre-Hungarian (Slaná: salt river) and most likely not associated with the salinity but with the salt road existing already in times of Great Moravia. The supporters argue by citing numerous Slavic toponyms in the river basin and by local names related to soľ (salt) and Moravia like Moravce, Soľár, Solišče, Soľka, Soľník, Morava (according to this interpretation the Hungarian name is a later translation).
