= Suchá =

- Municipality
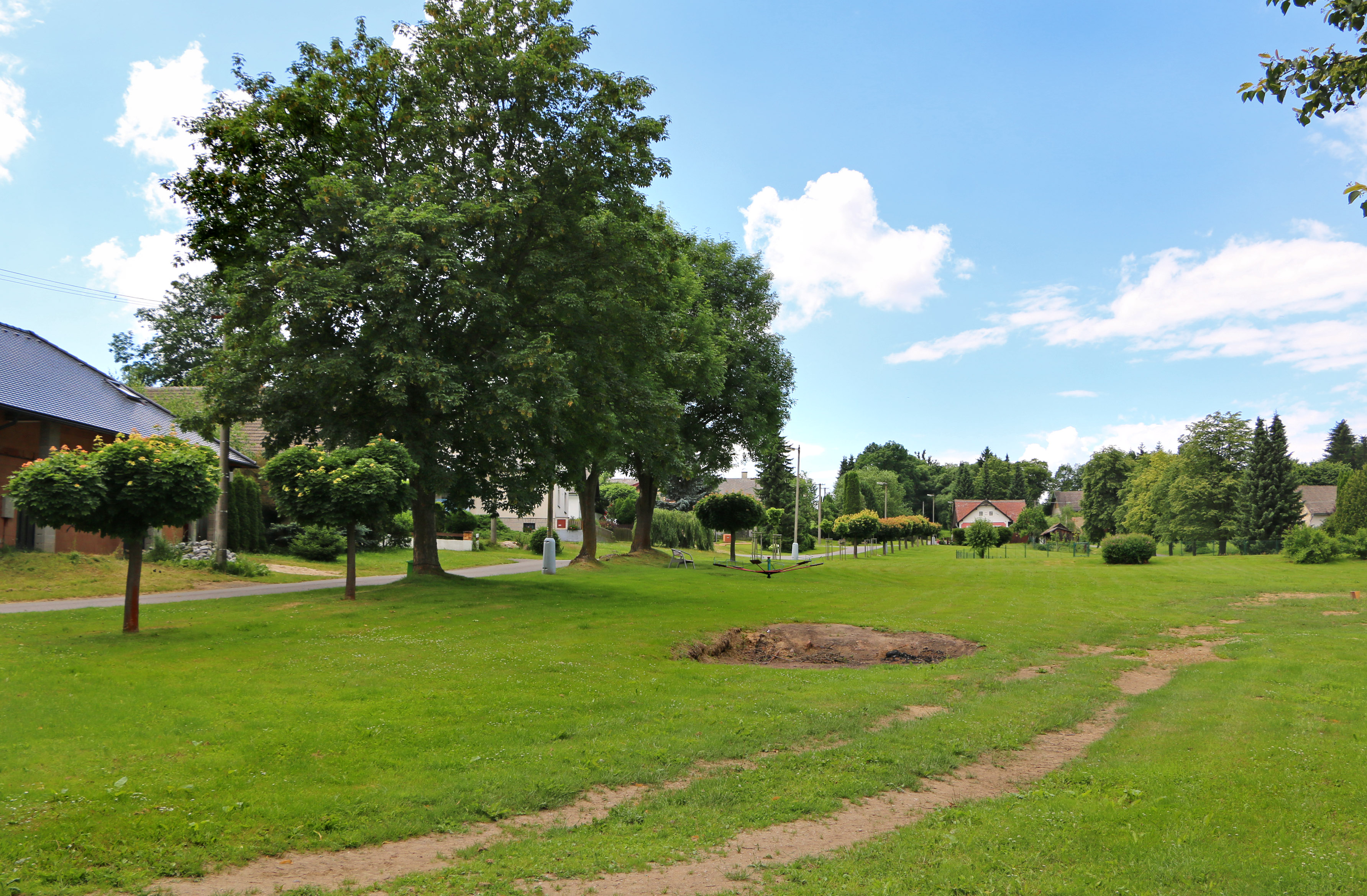
- Centre of Suchá

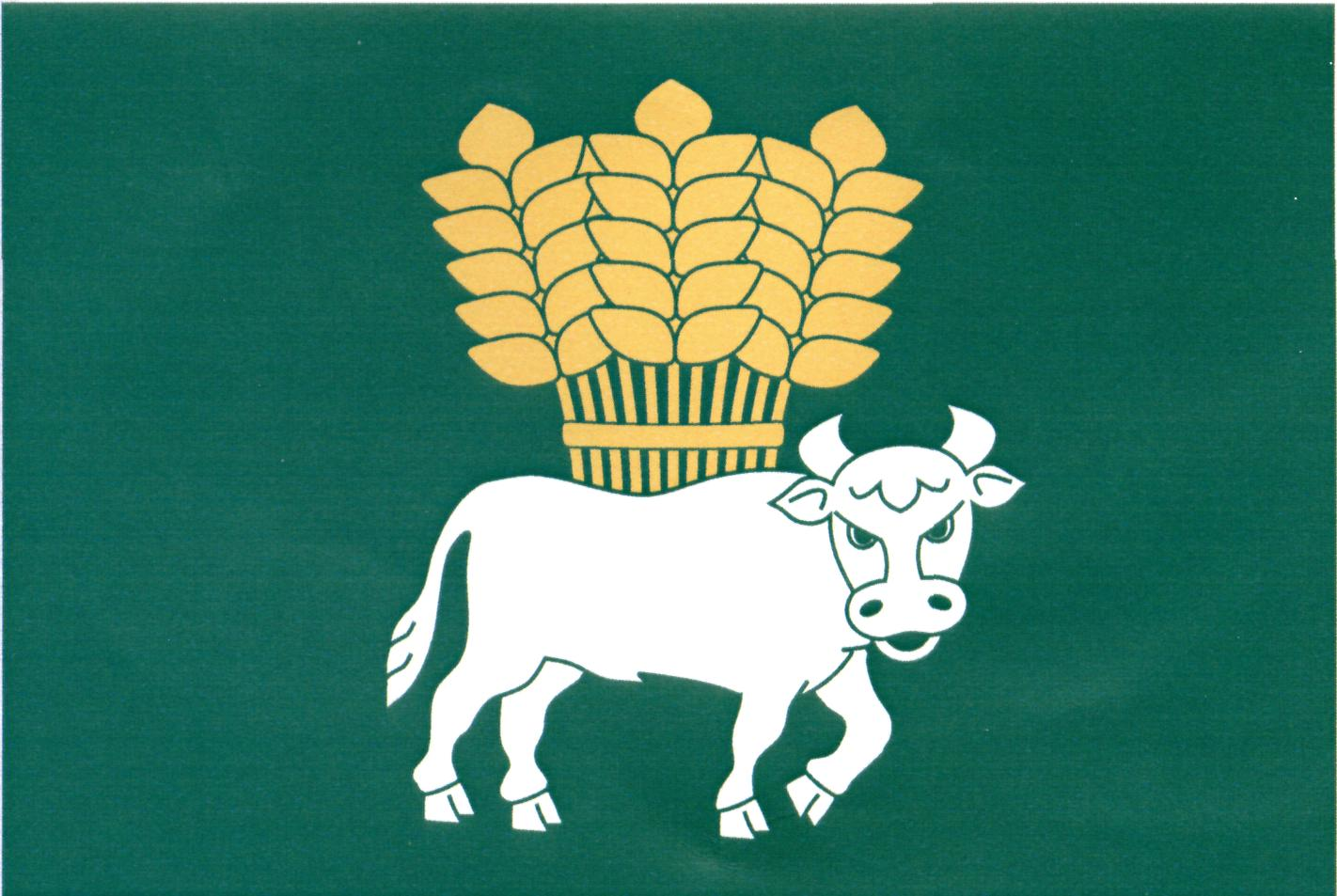
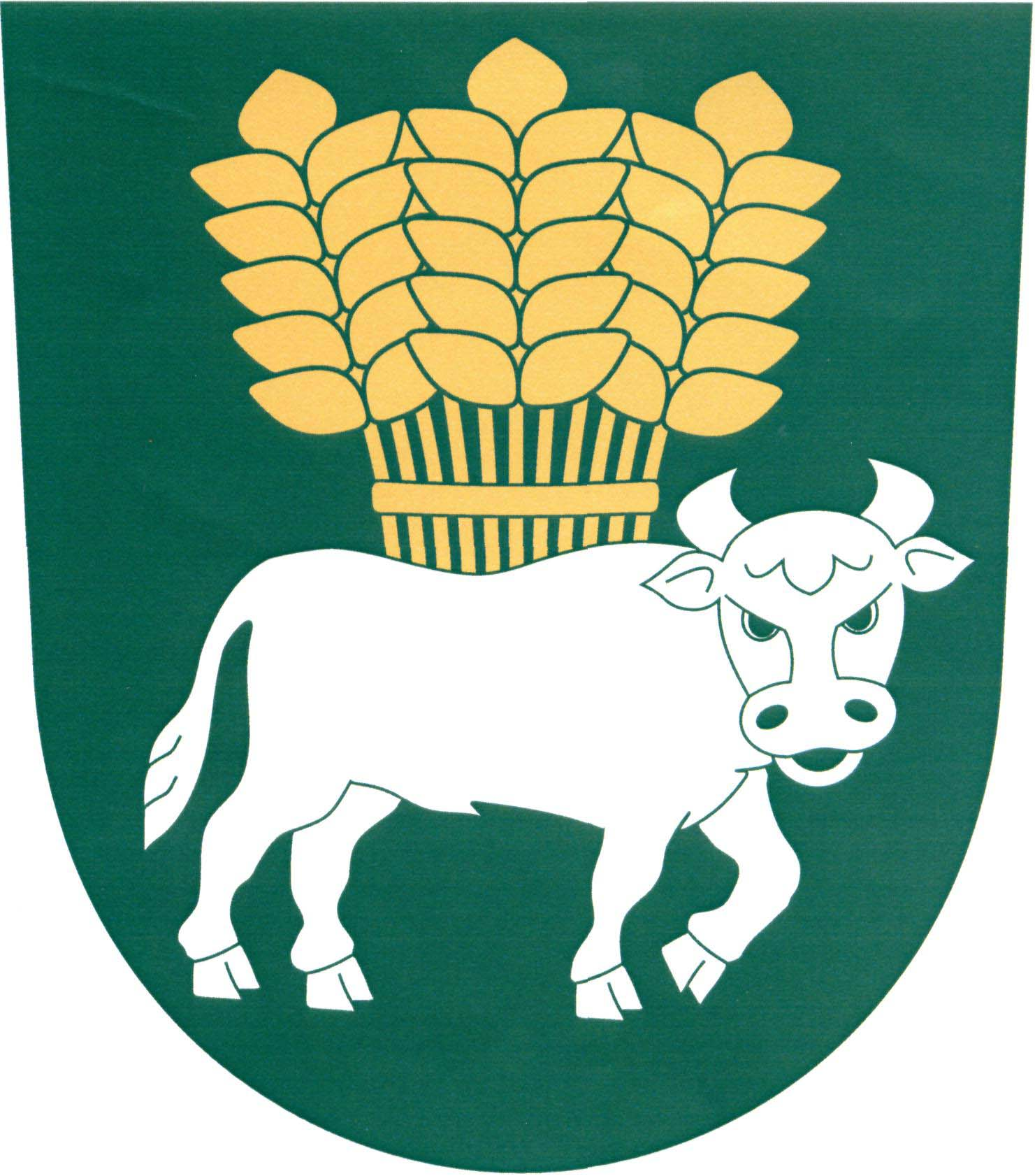
- Flag Coat of arms

- Location in the Czech Republic
- Coordinates: 49°18′4″N 15°34′39″E
- Country: Czech Republic
- Region: Vysočina
- District: Jihlava
- First mentioned: 1405

Area
  - Total: 11.48 km^{2} (4.43 sq mi)
- Elevation: 542 m (1,778 ft)

Population (2026-01-01)
  - Total: 244
  - Density: 21.3/km^{2} (55.0/sq mi)
- Time zone: UTC+1 (CET)
  - Summer (DST): UTC+2 (CEST)
- Postal code: 588 33
- Website: www.obecsucha.cz

Suchá (Czech pronunciation: [ˈsuxaː]) is a municipality and village in Jihlava District in the Vysočina Region of the Czech Republic. It has about 200 inhabitants.

Suchá lies approximately 10 kilometres (6 mi) south of Jihlava and 120 km (75 mi) south-east of Prague.

== Administrative division ==
Suchá consists of three municipal parts (in brackets population according to the 2021 census):

- Suchá (118)
- Beranovec (46)
- Prostředkovice (86)

== History ==
The first written mention of Suchá is from 1405.

== Demographics ==
Historical population
| Year | Pop. | ±% |
|---|---|---|
| 1869 | 571 | — |
| 1880 | 591 | +3.5% |
| 1890 | 575 | −2.7% |
| 1900 | 536 | −6.8% |
| 1910 | 497 | −7.3% |
| 1921 | 458 | −7.8% |
| 1930 | 435 | −5.0% |
| 1950 | 331 | −23.9% |
| 1961 | 348 | +5.1% |
| 1970 | 279 | −19.8% |
| 1980 | 229 | −17.9% |
| 1991 | 208 | −9.2% |
| 2001 | 215 | +3.4% |
| 2011 | 282 | +31.2% |
| 2021 | 250 | −11.3% |
Source: Censuses
