= Belá (river) =

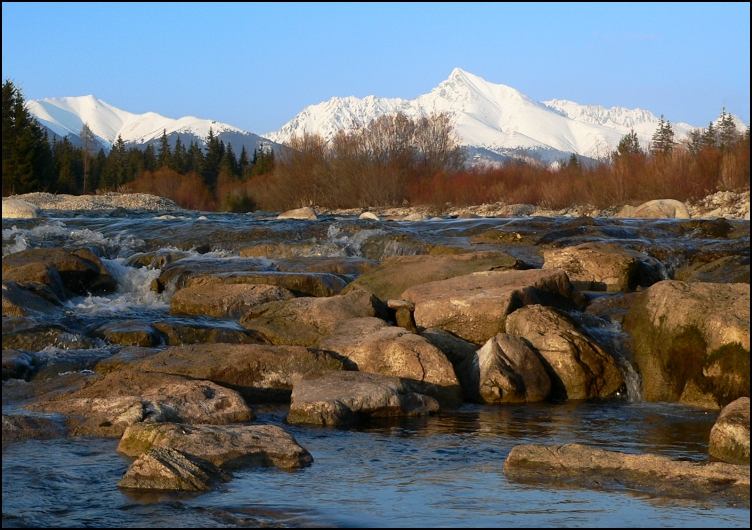

Physical characteristics
- Source
  - location: High Tatra
- Mouth
  - location: Váh in Liptovský Hrádok
  - coordinates: 49.0349°N 19.7101°E
- Length: 23 km (14 mi)
- Basin size: 244 km^{2} (94 sq mi)

Basin features
- Progression: Váh→ Danube→ Black Sea

The Belá (Hungarian: Béla-patak), 22 kilometres (14 mi) in length, is a mountainous stream draining the headwaters of the Váh River basin in Tatra National Park, northern Slovakia. It is a right tributary, into which it flows at the town of Liptovský Hrádok. The Belá itself is formed by two tributaries, the streams Tichý potok and Kôprovský potok, whose sources are in the High Tatra mountains, and which have their confluence near Podbanské, part of the town of Vysoké Tatry. It is 23 km (14 mi) long and its basin size is 244 km^{2} (94 sq mi).

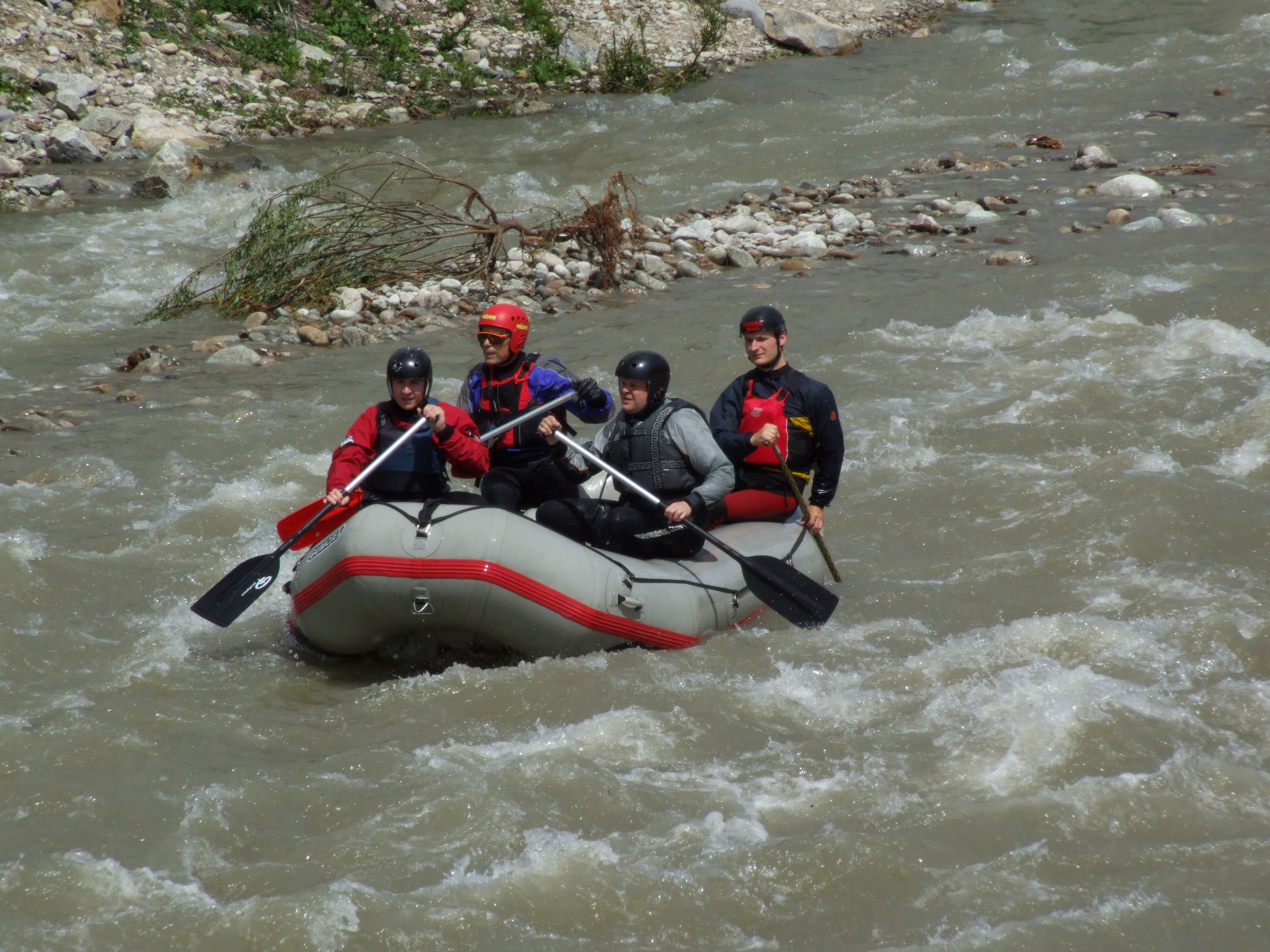
Rafting on the Belá River (June 2010)

The Belá is well suited to rafting and kayaking.
