= Liptovský Hrádok =

- Municipality
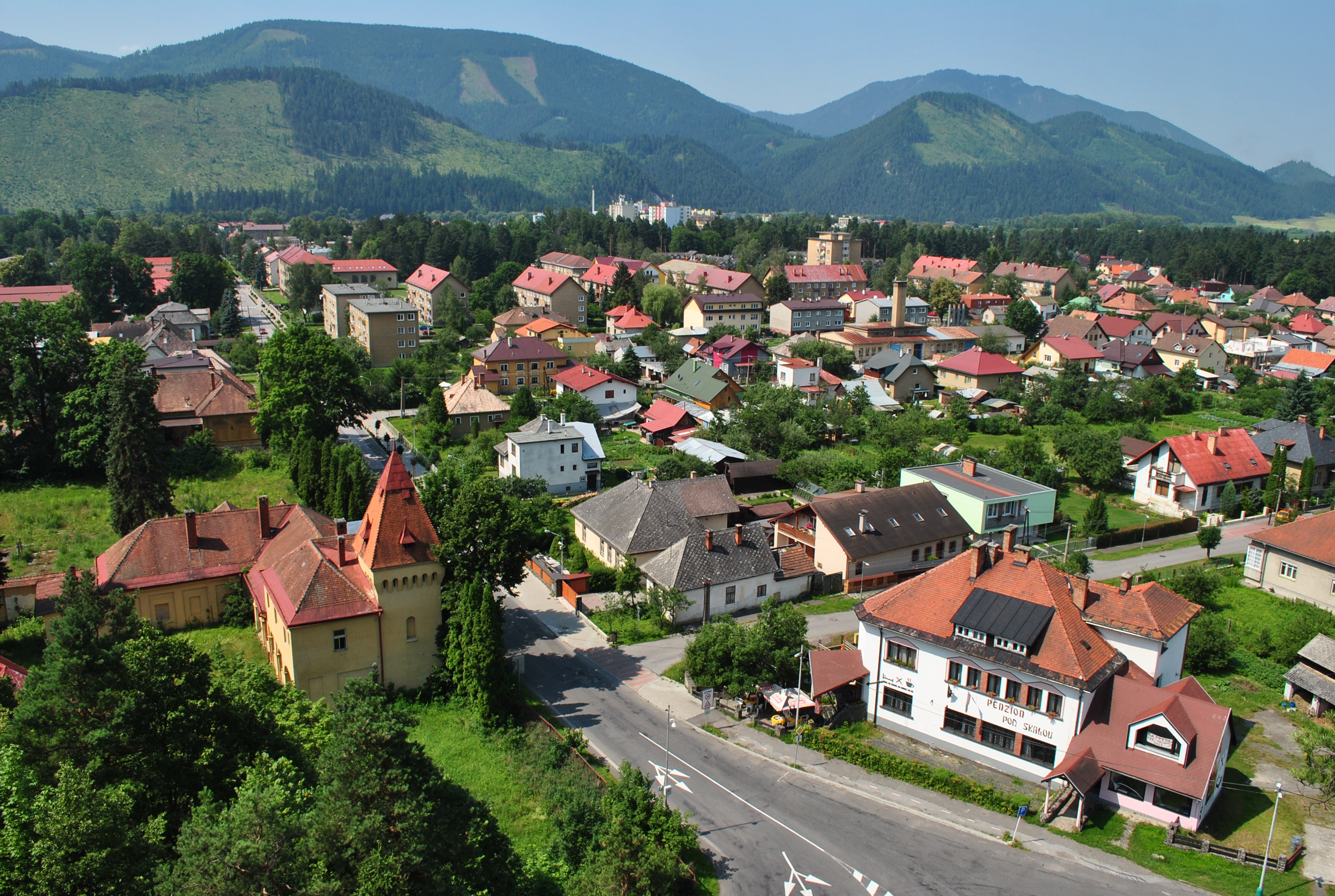

- Flag Coat of arms

- Location of Liptovský Hrádok in the Žilina Region Location of Liptovský Hrádok in Slovakia
- Coordinates: 49.04°N 19.73°E
- Country: Slovakia
- Region: Žilina Region
- District: Liptovský Mikuláš District
- First mentioned: 1341

Government
  - Mayor: Branislav Tréger

Area
  - Total: 18.32 km^{2} (7.07 sq mi)
- Elevation: 656 m (2,152 ft)

Population (2025)
  - Total: 6,979
- Time zone: UTC+1 (CET)
  - Summer (DST): UTC+2 (CEST)
- Postal code: 033 01
- Area code: +421 44
- Vehicle registration plate (until 2022): LM
- Website: www.liptovskyhradok.sk

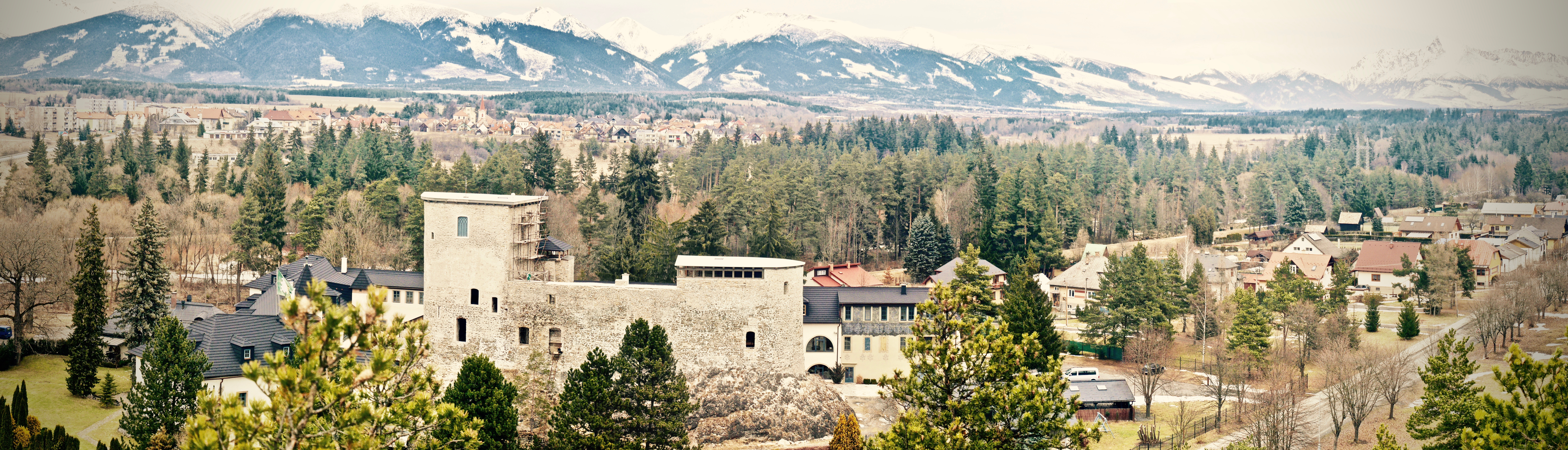
Panoramic of Liptovsky Hrádok, Slovakia, taken in February 2017. ©Cathriona Hanley

Liptovský Hrádok (Slovak pronunciation: [ˈliptɔwskiː ˈɦraːdɔk]; German: Neuhäusel in der Liptau; Hungarian: Liptóújvár) is a town in northern Slovakia, in the region of Liptov.

== History ==
First mentioned in 1341, Liptovský Hrádok was named after the nearby castle. The castle, also known as Liptovský Hrádok, was built originally for use of the forestry commission, hunters of the area and the Catholic Church. The castle was later modified and furnished in the style of Louis XVI. The name of the town and the castle literally means "little castle of Liptov". A salt processing facility was constructed in 1728 to collect salt for the Solivar Salt Works which now is part of Prešov, a Slovak city further to the East. This helped Liptovský Hrádok rise to some prominence in the region. The population centre of the town was the main street, which runs from the castle to the south continuing along to the Váh River and the hamlet of Prekážka. Before the establishment of independent Czechoslovakia in 1918, Liptovský Hrádok was part of Liptó County within the Kingdom of Hungary. From 1939 to 1945, it was part of the Slovak Republic.

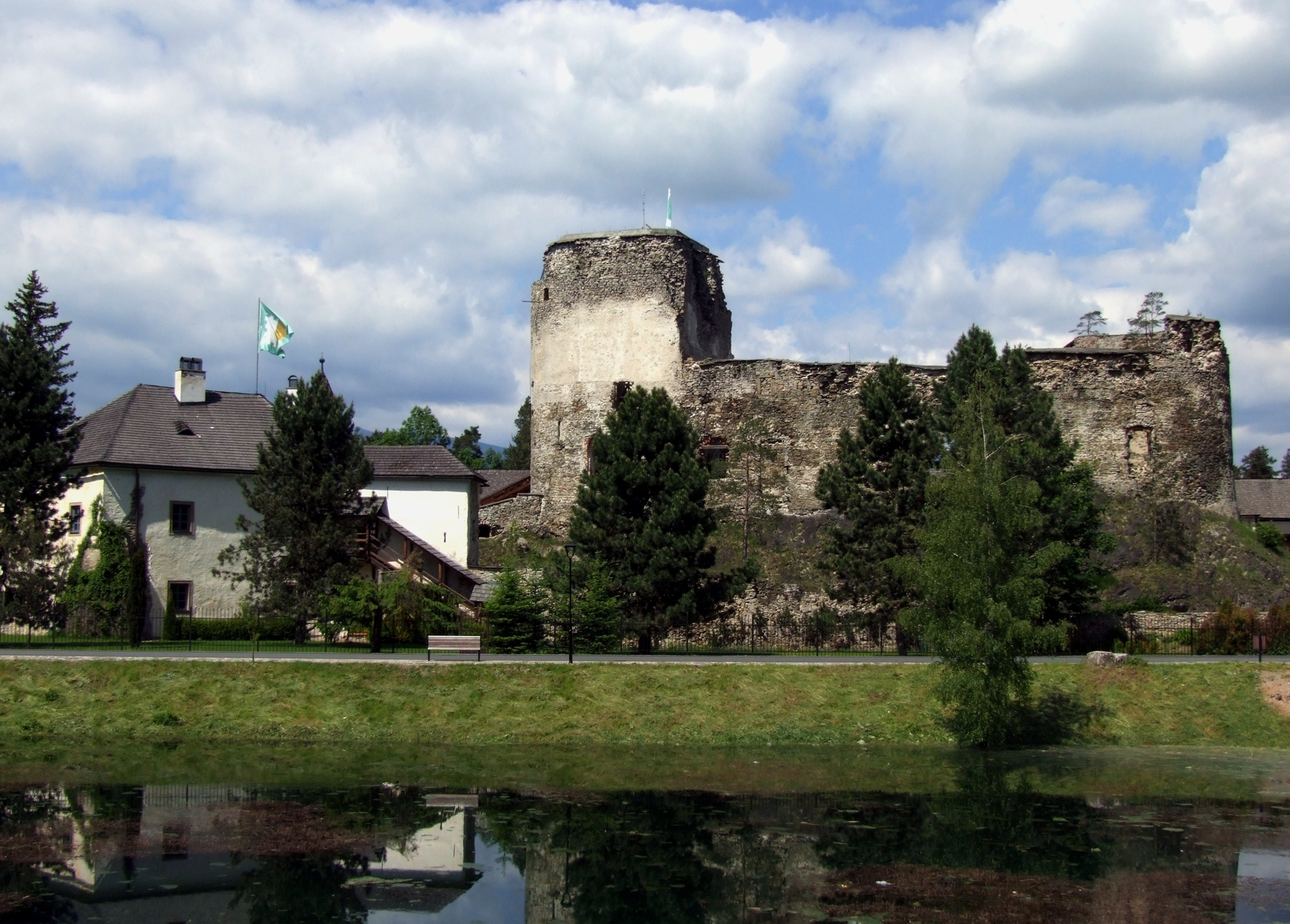
View of the castle and mansion

== Geography and climate ==
The municipality lies at an altitude of 656 metres (2,152 ft) and covers an area of 18.32 km^{2} (7.07 sq mi) (2025).

The region of Liptovský Hrádok is bordered by the Low Tatras to the south and partially bordered by the West and High Tatras. The town is situated in the middle of the Liptov Basin created by the Váh River. It is in the centre of northern Liptov and lies on the confluence of the rivers Váh and Belá. The average altitude of the town is 637 meters above sea level. Liptovský Hrádok has a moist warm climate with an average temperature about 16 °C (61 °F), while the more mountainous parts are colder. The temperature is about 18–23 °C (64–73 °F) in the summer and in the winter about −10 °C (14 °F). Rainfall is very frequent in this part and the weather often changes quickly. Snowfall stays on the ground approximately 140 days during the year.

Facts about Liptovský Hrádok:

- Liptovsky Hradok had 731 inhabitants in 1869 and currently (in 2012) has 7,454 inhabitants.
- Area of the town: 1.832 ha.
- Dovalovo is its town section with 1001 inhabitants
- Average yearly temperature: 6.3 °C (43 °F).
- Maximum temperature: 31.0 °C (88 °F)
- Minimum temperature: −25.0 °C (−13 °F)
- Absolute maximum: 34.4 °C (94 °F) (16.08.1952)
- Absolute minimum: −38 °C (−36 °F) (11.02.1929)
- Length of sunshine: 140 days per year
- Average rainfall per year 691 mm
- Average number of cold days year: 160.4 days
- Average number of summer days per year: 28.9 days

== Population ==
Population statistic (10 years)
Year	1995	2005	2015	2025
Count	8611	7861	7606	6979
Difference		−8.70%	−3.24%	−8.24%

Population statistic
Year	2024	2025
Count	6950	6979
Difference		+0.41%

It has a population of 6979 people (31 December 2025).

=== Ethnicity ===
Census 2021 (1+ %)
Ethnicity	Number	Fraction
Slovak	6704	93.7%
Not found out	362	5.06%
Czech	93	1.29%
Total	7154	

In year 2021 was 7154 people by ethnicity 6704 as Slovak, 362 as Not found out, 93 as Czech, 30 as Romani, 25 as Other, 12 as Rusyn, 10 as Vietnamese, 10 as Hungarian, 9 as Russian, 7 as German, 6 as English, 5 as Polish, 4 as Serbian, 3 as Jewish, 3 as Chinese, 2 as Ukrainian, 2 as Moravian, 1 as Italian, 1 as Austrian, 1 as Greek, 1 as French, 1 as Croatian and 1 as Bulgarian.

Note on population: The difference values of population numbers in the table "Population statistic" and in the sections "Ethnicity" & "Religion" is caused by the use of various statistical methods.

=== Religion ===
Census 2021 (1+ %)
Religion	Number	Fraction
None	2342	32.74%
Evangelical Church	2218	31%
Roman Catholic Church	1887	26.38%
Not found out	438	6.12%
Total	7154	

In year 2021 was 7154 people by religion 2342 from None, 2218 from Evangelical Church, 1887 from Roman Catholic Church, 438 from Not found out, 51 from Greek Catholic Church, 40 from Other and not ascertained christian church, 24 from Other, 23 from Baptists Church, 21 from Ad hoc movements, 19 from Seventh-day Adventist Church, 18 from Jehovah's Witnesses, 14 from United Methodist Church, 11 from Buddhism, 8 from Eastern Orthodox Church, 8 from Christian Congregations in Slovakia, 7 from Apostolic Church, 5 from Calvinist Church, 5 from Paganism and natural spirituality, 5 from Islam, 5 from Church of the Brethren, 2 from Jewish community, 2 from Czechoslovak Hussite Church and 1 from Bahá'i Community.

According to the 2001 census, the town had 8,232 inhabitants. 97.11% of inhabitants were Slovaks, 1.37% Czechs, 0.72% Roma and 0.15% Hungarians. The religious make-up was 42.23% Lutherans, 31.74% Roman Catholics and 21.14% people with no religious affiliation.

== Twin towns – sister cities ==
Liptovský Hrádok is twinned with:

- Česká Skalice, Czech Republic
- Hradec nad Moravicí, Czech Republic
- Nowy Targ, Poland
- Stary Sącz, Poland
