= Krtíš =

Location
- Country: Slovakia

Physical characteristics
- Mouth: Ipeľ
  - coordinates: 48.0886°N 19.3080°E
- Length: 35.5 km (22.1 mi)
- Basin size: 234 km^{2} (90 sq mi)

Basin features
- Progression: Ipeľ→ Danube→ Black Sea

Krtíš is a river in southern central Slovakia. It flows through Zvolen and Veľký Krtíš districts, through the towns of Modrý Kameň and Veľký Krtíš. It enters the Ipeľ river near Slovenské Ďarmoty as a right tributary. It is 35.5 km (22.1 mi) long and its basin size is 234 km^{2} (90 sq mi).

== Gallery ==
The Krtíš fragment of the Emmaus Glagolitic Comestor
