= Lužianky =

Lužianky Sarlókajsza
- Municipality
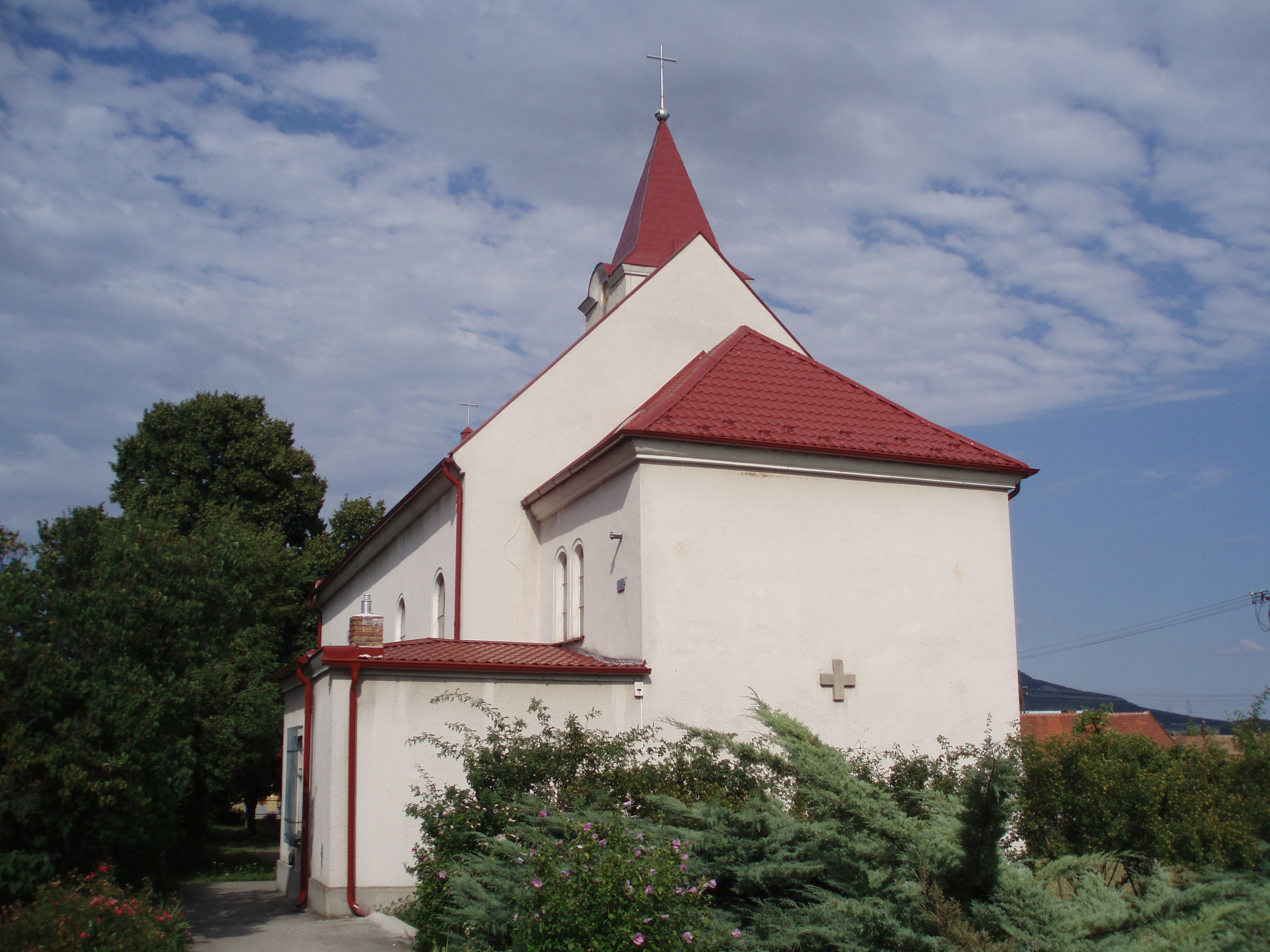

- Flag

- Location of Lužianky in the Nitra Region Location of Lužianky in Slovakia
- Coordinates: 48.33°N 18.05°E
- Country: Slovakia
- Region: Nitra Region
- District: Nitra District
- First mentioned: 1113

Area
  - Total: 12.42 km^{2} (4.80 sq mi)
- Elevation: 154 m (505 ft)

Population (2025)
  - Total: 3,556
- Time zone: UTC+1 (CET)
  - Summer (DST): UTC+2 (CEST)
- Postal code: 951 41
- Area code: +421 37
- Vehicle registration plate (until 2022): NR
- Website: www.luzianky.sk

Lužianky (Hungarian: Sarlókajsza) is a village and municipality in the Nitra District in western central Slovakia, in the Nitra Region.

== History ==
In historical records the village was first mentioned in 1113.

== Geography ==
The municipality lies at an altitude of 154 metres (505 ft) and covers an area of 12.42 km^{2} (4.80 sq mi) (2025).

== Population ==
Population statistic (10 years)
Year	1995	2005	2015	2025
Count	2389	2589	2919	3556
Difference		+8.37%	+12.74%	+21.82%

Population statistic
Year	2024	2025
Count	3456	3556
Difference		+2.89%

It has a population of 3556 people (31 December 2025).

=== Ethnicity ===
Census 2021 (1+ %)
Ethnicity	Number	Fraction
Slovak	2929	95.71%
Not found out	107	3.49%
Total	3060	

In year 2021 was 3060 people by ethnicity 2929 as Slovak, 107 as Not found out, 22 as Czech, 11 as Romani, 10 as Hungarian, 6 as Other, 5 as Rusyn, 4 as Ukrainian, 4 as Italian, 4 as German, 3 as Serbian, 3 as Russian, 1 as Austrian, 1 as Polish, 1 as Bulgarian and 1 as Albanian.

Note on population: The difference values of population numbers in the table "Population statistic" and in the sections "Ethnicity" & "Religion" is caused by the use of various statistical methods.

=== Religion ===
Census 2021 (1+ %)
Religion	Number	Fraction
Roman Catholic Church	2155	70.42%
None	659	21.54%
Not found out	96	3.14%
Evangelical Church	52	1.7%
Total	3060	

In year 2021 was 3060 people by religion 2155 from Roman Catholic Church, 659 from None, 96 from Not found out, 52 from Evangelical Church, 28 from Christian Congregations in Slovakia, 17 from Other, 16 from Greek Catholic Church, 11 from Ad hoc movements, 6 from Other and not ascertained christian church, 5 from Paganism and natural spirituality, 4 from Buddhism, 3 from Calvinist Church, 2 from Eastern Orthodox Church, 2 from Church of the Brethren, 1 from Old Catholic Church, 1 from Jehovah's Witnesses, 1 from Islam and 1 from Baptists Church.

== Facilities ==
The village has a public library a gym and football pitch.
