= Štiavnica =

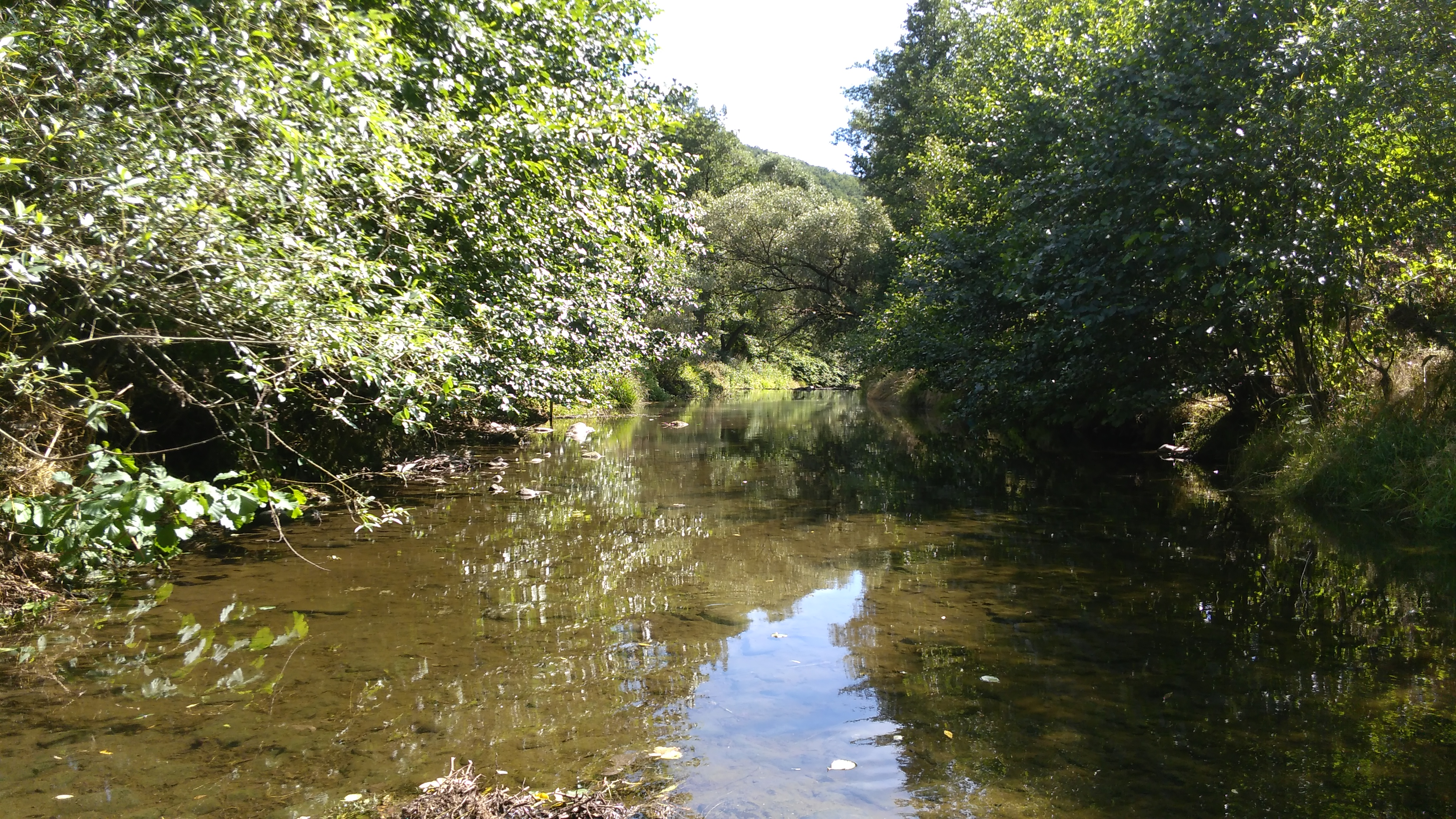

Location
- Country: Slovakia

Physical characteristics
- Mouth: Ipeľ
  - coordinates: 48.0790°N 18.8677°E
- Length: 55.2 km (34.3 mi)
- Basin size: 443 km^{2} (171 sq mi)

Basin features
- Progression: Ipeľ→ Danube→ Black Sea

The Štiavnica is a river in southern central Slovakia. It flows through Banská Štiavnica, Krupina and Levice districts, and through the town of Banská Štiavnica. It enters the Ipeľ river west of Šahy as a right tributary. It is 55.2 km (34.3 mi) long and its basin size is 443 km^{2} (171 sq mi).

== See also ==
- Minor planet 22185 Štiavnica
