= Komoča =

Komoča Kamocsa
- Municipality
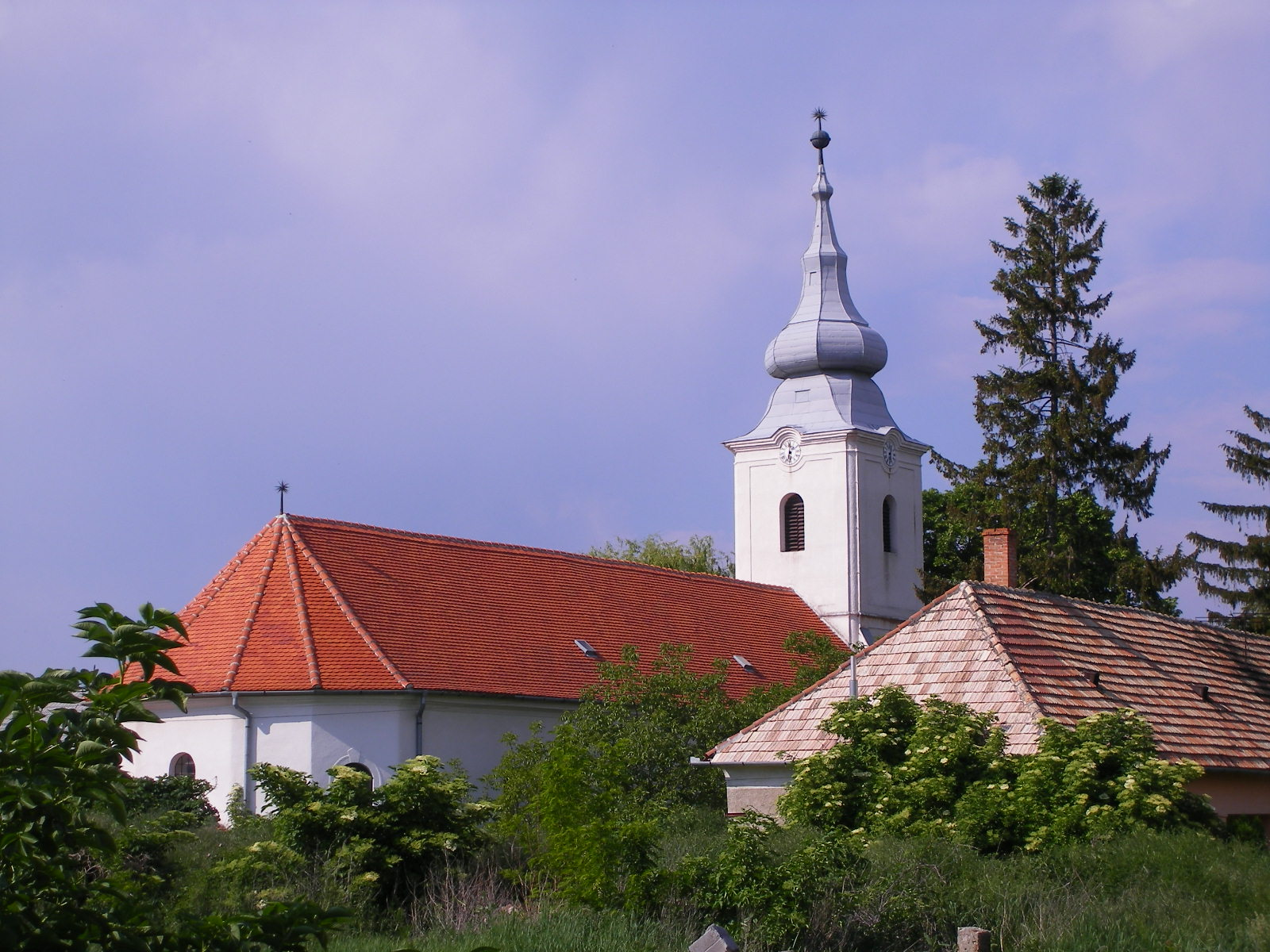
- Reformed church

- Flag Coat of arms

- Location of Komoča in the Nitra Region Location of Komoča in Slovakia
- Coordinates: 47.95°N 18.02°E
- Country: Slovakia
- Region: Nitra Region
- District: Nové Zámky District
- First mentioned: 1416

Government
  - Mayor: Imrich Lukács

Area
  - Total: 13.47 km^{2} (5.20 sq mi)
- Elevation: 110 m (360 ft)

Population (2025)
  - Total: 918
- Time zone: UTC+1 (CET)
  - Summer (DST): UTC+2 (CEST)
- Postal code: 941 21
- Area code: +421 35
- Vehicle registration plate (until 2022): NZ
- Website: www.obeckomoca.sk

Komoča (Hungarian: Kamocsa) is a village and municipality in the Nové Zámky District in the Nitra Region of south-west Slovakia.

== Geography ==
The municipality lies at an altitude of 110 metres (360 ft) and covers an area of 13.47 km^{2} (5.20 sq mi) (2025).

== History ==
In historical records the village was first mentioned in 1416. After the Austro-Hungarian army disintegrated in November 1918, Czechoslovak troops occupied the area, later acknowledged internationally by the Treaty of Trianon. Between 1938and 1945 Komoča once more became part of Miklós Horthy's Hungary through the First Vienna Award. From 1945 until the Velvet Divorce, it was part of Czechoslovakia. Since then it has been part of Slovakia.

== Population ==
Population statistic (10 years)
Year	1995	2005	2015	2025
Count	963	923	940	918
Difference		−4.15%	+1.84%	−2.34%

Population statistic
Year	2024	2025
Count	930	918
Difference		−1.29%

It has a population of 918 people (31 December 2025).

=== Ethnicity ===
Census 2021 (1+ %)
Ethnicity	Number	Fraction
Hungarian	673	70.47%
Slovak	244	25.54%
Not found out	93	9.73%
Total	955	

In year 2021 was 955 people by ethnicity 673 as Hungarian, 244 as Slovak, 93 as Not found out, 9 as Czech, 3 as Romani, 1 as German and 1 as Greek.

Note on population: The difference values of population numbers in the table "Population statistic" and in the sections "Ethnicity" & "Religion" is caused by the use of various statistical methods.

=== Religion ===
Census 2021 (1+ %)
Religion	Number	Fraction
Calvinist Church	399	41.78%
Roman Catholic Church	246	25.76%
None	200	20.94%
Not found out	72	7.54%
Evangelical Church	22	2.3%
Total	955	

In year 2021 was 955 people by religion 399 from Calvinist Church, 246 from Roman Catholic Church, 200 from None, 72 from Not found out, 22 from Evangelical Church, 7 from Christian Congregations in Slovakia, 3 from Greek Catholic Church, 2 from Jehovah's Witnesses, 2 from Other, 1 from Buddhism and 1 from Ad hoc movements.

== Facilities ==
The village has a public library a swimming pool and a football pitch.

== Genealogical resources ==
The records for genealogical research are available at the state archive "Statny Archiv in Bratislava, Nitra, Slovakia"

- Roman Catholic church records (births/marriages/deaths): 1796-1895 (parish B)
- Reformated church records (births/marriages/deaths): 1711-1897 (parish A)

== See also ==
- List of municipalities and towns in Slovakia
