= Turiec (Váh) =

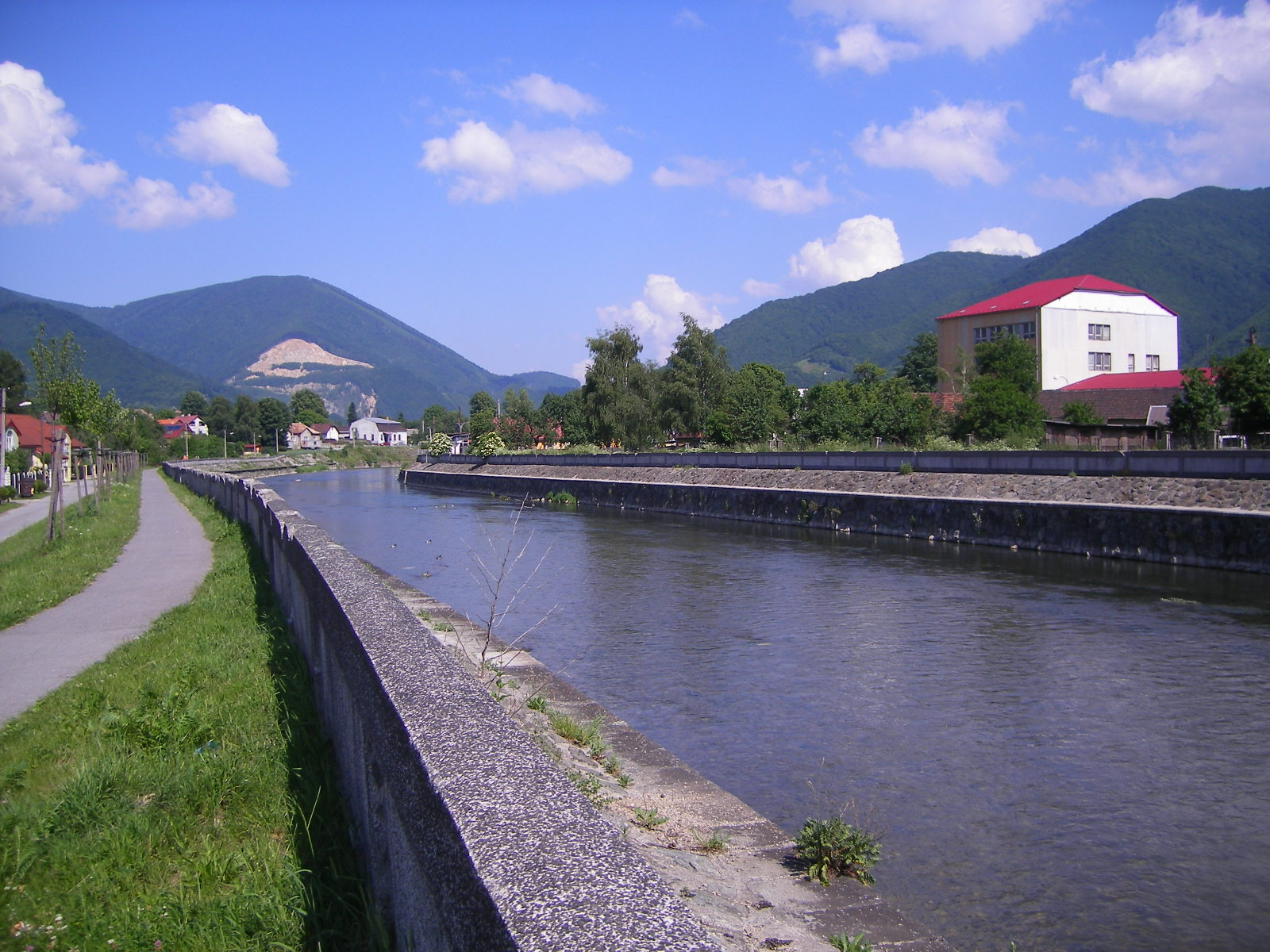
- Turiec River in Vrútky

Physical characteristics
- Source
  - location: Veľká Fatra
- Mouth
  - location: Váh in Vrútky
  - coordinates: 49.1205°N 18.9162°E
- Length: 67 km (42 mi)
- Basin size: 931 km^{2} (359 sq mi)

Basin features
- Progression: Váh→ Danube→ Black Sea

See also Turiec (Sajó).

The Turiec (Slovak pronunciation: [ˈturɪets], Hungarian: Turóc) is a river in north-western Slovakia. It is a tributary to the Váh, into which it flows near the city of Martin. Its source is in the Veľká Fatra Mountains. It is 67 km (42 mi) long and its basin size is 931 km^{2} (359 sq mi). The Turiec region is named after this river.

== Etymology ==
Pliny the Elder associated the name with Durius (the ancient name of Upper Váh), Ptolemy with the Celtic Taurisci tribe. The name is probably derived from the Indo-European appellative tur- (Slovak: tur, English: bull). The root is used also in a broad sense - "rich" or "strong". The Hungarian name Turóc comes from the ancient Slavic form Turъcь (1113 Turc).

== Fauna ==
There were recorded 18 species of molluscs in Turiec river. That includes 8 species of freshwater gastropods and 10 species of freshwater bivalves.
