= Turiec (Sajó) =

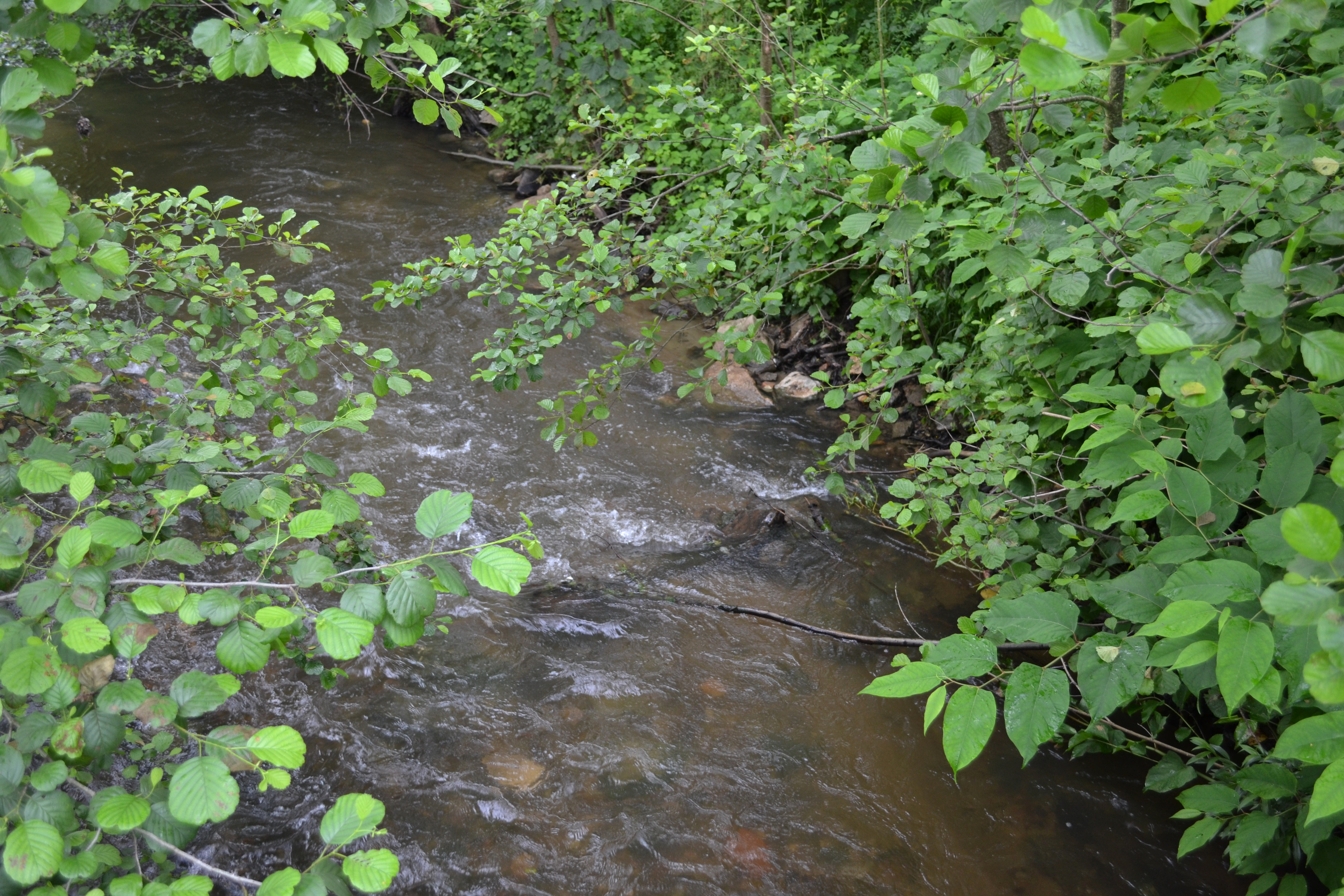

Location
- Country: Slovakia

Physical characteristics
- Mouth
  - location: Sajó
  - coordinates: 48.4092°N 20.3096°E
- Length: 44.8 km (27.8 mi)
- Basin size: 305 km^{2} (118 sq mi)

Basin features
- Progression: Sajó→ Tisza→ Danube→ Black Sea

The Turiec (Hungarian: Turóc) is a river in southern Slovakia. It is a right tributary to the Sajó (Slovak: Slaná), into which it flows near the town of Tornaľa. It is 44.8 km (27.8 mi) long and its basin size is 305 km^{2} (118 sq mi).
