= Vlkyňa =

Municipality of Slovakia

Vlkyňa Velkenye
- Municipality
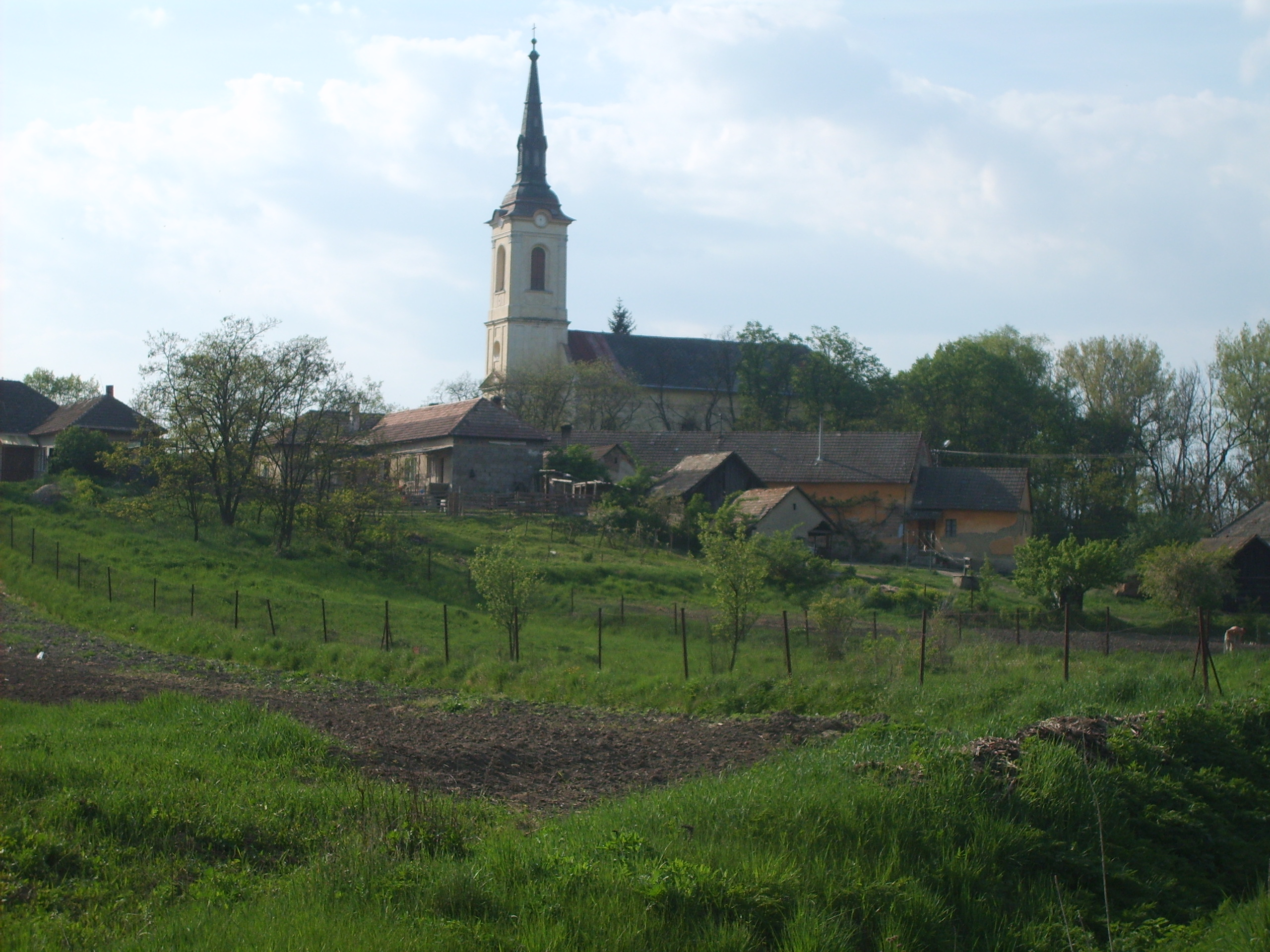

- Flag

- Location of Vlkyňa in the Banská Bystrica Region Location of Vlkyňa in Slovakia
- Coordinates: 48.28°N 20.30°E
- Country: Slovakia
- Region: Banská Bystrica Region
- District: Rimavská Sobota District
- First mentioned: 1216

Area
  - Total: 11.72 km^{2} (4.53 sq mi)
- Elevation: 162 m (531 ft)

Population (2025)
  - Total: 406
- Time zone: UTC+1 (CET)
  - Summer (DST): UTC+2 (CEST)
- Postal code: 980 44
- Area code: +421 47
- Vehicle registration plate (until 2022): RS
- Website: www.vlkyna.sk

Vlkyňa (Hungarian: Velkenye) is a village and municipality in the Rimavská Sobota District of the Banská Bystrica Region of southern Slovakia.

== Geography ==
The municipality lies at an altitude of 162 metres (531 ft) and covers an area of 11.72 km^{2} (4.53 sq mi) (2025).

== Population ==
Population statistic (10 years)
| Year | 1995 | 2005 | 2015 | 2025 |
|---|---|---|---|---|
| Count | 300 | 347 | 406 | 406 |
| Difference | | +15.66% | +17.00% | +1.42% |

Population statistic
| Year | 2024 | 2025 |
|---|---|---|
| Count | 401 | 406 |
| Difference | | +1.24% |

It has a population of 406 people (31 December 2025).

=== Ethnicity ===
Census 2021 (1+ %)
| Ethnicity | Number | Fraction |
|---|---|---|
| Hungarian | 345 | 88.68% |
| Romani | 34 | 8.74% |
| Slovak | 33 | 8.48% |
| Not found out | 5 | 1.28% |
| Total | 389 | |

In year 2021 was 389 people by ethnicity 345 as Hungarian, 34 as Romani, 33 as Slovak, 5 as Not found out and 2 as Czech.

Note on population: The difference values of population numbers in the table "Population statistic" and in the sections "Ethnicity" & "Religion" is caused by the use of various statistical methods.

=== Religion ===
Census 2021 (1+ %)
| Religion | Number | Fraction |
|---|---|---|
| Roman Catholic Church | 339 | 87.15% |
| None | 35 | 9% |
| Calvinist Church | 12 | 3.08% |
| Total | 389 | |

In year 2021 was 389 people by religion 339 from Roman Catholic Church, 35 from None, 12 from Calvinist Church, 1 from Jehovah's Witnesses, 1 from Not found out and 1 from Christian Congregations in Slovakia.
