= Bretka =

Bretka Beretke
- Municipality
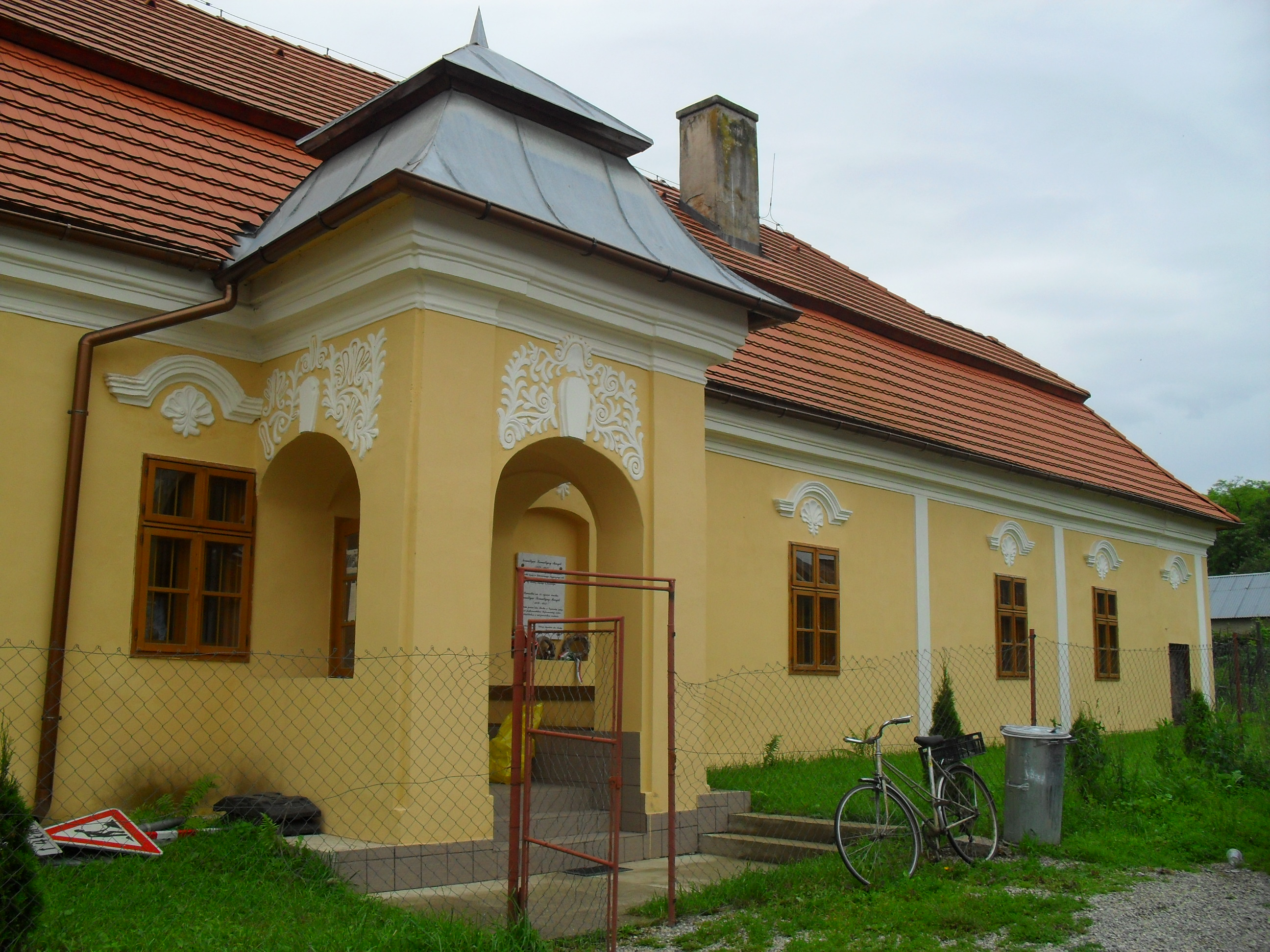

- Flag

- Location of Bretka in the Košice Region Location of Bretka in Slovakia
- Coordinates: 48.48°N 20.35°E
- Country: Slovakia
- Region: Košice Region
- District: Rožňava District
- First mentioned: 1286

Government
  - Mayor: Mária Vajda Susány (Ind.)

Area
  - Total: 9.54 km^{2} (3.68 sq mi)
- Elevation: 191 m (627 ft)

Population (2025)
  - Total: 402
- Time zone: UTC+1 (CET)
  - Summer (DST): UTC+2 (CEST)
- Postal code: 980 46
- Area code: +421 47
- Vehicle registration plate (until 2022): RV
- Website: www.obec-bretka.eu

Bretka (Hungarian: Beretke) is a village and municipality in the Rožňava District in the Košice Region of eastern Slovakia.

== Geography ==
The municipality lies at an altitude of 191 metres (627 ft) and covers an area of 9.54 km^{2} (3.68 sq mi) (2025).

== History ==
Before the establishment of independent Czechoslovakia in 1918, Bretka was part of Gömör and Kishont County within the Kingdom of Hungary. From 1938 to 1945, it was again part of Hungary as a result of the First Vienna Award.

== Genealogical resources ==
The records for genealogical research are available at the state archive "Statny Archiv in Banska Bystrica, Kosice, Slovakia"

- Roman Catholic church records (births/marriages/deaths): 1825-1896 (parish B)
- Lutheran church records (births/marriages/deaths): 1805-1908 (parish B)
- Reformated church records (births/marriages/deaths): 1792-1904 (parish A)

== Population ==
Population statistic (10 years)
Year	1995	2005	2015	2025
Count	358	369	404	402
Difference		+3.07%	+9.48%	−0.49%

Population statistic
Year	2024	2025
Count	397	402
Difference		+1.25%

It has a population of 402 people (31 December 2025).

=== Ethnicity ===
Census 2021 (1+ %)
Ethnicity	Number	Fraction
Hungarian	293	73.98%
Romani	98	24.74%
Slovak	80	20.2%
Not found out	26	6.56%
Total	396	

In year 2021 was 396 people by ethnicity 293 as Hungarian, 98 as Romani, 80 as Slovak and 26 as Not found out.

Note on population: The difference values of population numbers in the table "Population statistic" and in the sections "Ethnicity" & "Religion" is caused by the use of various statistical methods.

=== Religion ===
Census 2021 (1+ %)
Religion	Number	Fraction
Roman Catholic Church	161	40.66%
None	130	32.83%
Calvinist Church	65	16.41%
Evangelical Church	16	4.04%
Not found out	12	3.03%
Greek Catholic Church	7	1.77%
Total	396	

In year 2021 was 396 people by religion 161 from Roman Catholic Church, 130 from None, 65 from Calvinist Church, 16 from Evangelical Church, 12 from Not found out, 7 from Greek Catholic Church, 2 from Old Catholic Church, 2 from Jehovah's Witnesses and 1 from Other and not ascertained christian church.

== See also ==
- List of municipalities and towns in Slovakia
