= Chvojnica (river) =

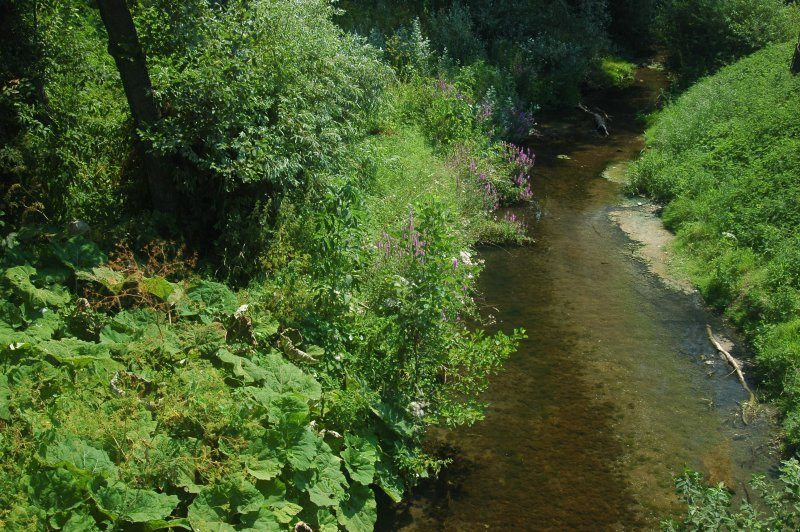

Location
- Country: Slovakia

Physical characteristics
- Mouth: Morava
  - coordinates: 48.8382°N 17.1309°E
- Length: 34.1 km (21.2 mi)
- Basin size: 125 km^{2} (48 sq mi)

Basin features
- Progression: Morava→ Danube→ Black Sea

The Chvojnica is a river in western Slovakia. It is a left tributary to the Morava, into which it flows near the town of Holíč. Its source is in the White Carpathians. It is 34.1 km (21.2 mi) long and its basin size is 125 km^{2} (48 sq mi).

== Etymology ==
The name comes from Slavic chvojъ, chvoja—tree branches. 1217 caput fontis Hoynicha.
