= Váh =

River in Slovakia

Coordinates: 47°55′N 18°01′E

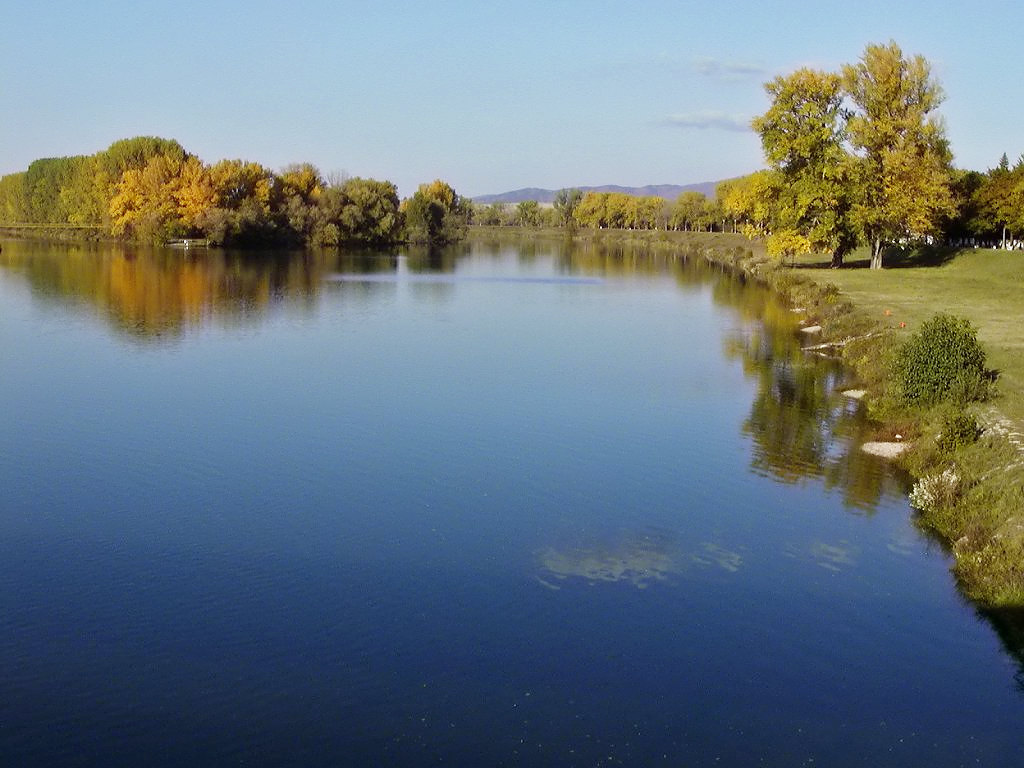
- The Váh near Piešťany.

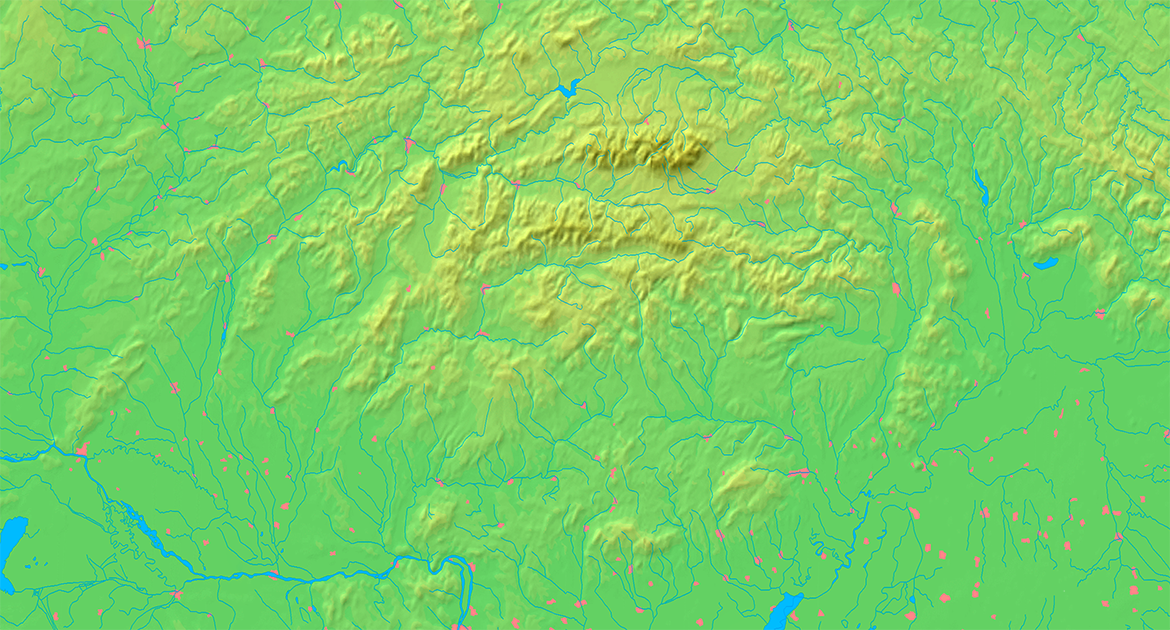
- The current and watershed of the Váh from its Čierny Váh (Southern) and Biely Váh (Northern) sources until it enters the Danube (magenta)

Location
- Country: Slovakia

Physical characteristics
- Source: Čierny Váh
  - location: Kráľova hoľa, Nízke Tatry
- 2nd source: Biely Váh
  - location: Važecká dolina, Vysoké Tatry
- Mouth: Danube River
  - location: Komárno
  - elevation: 106.5 m (349 ft)
- Length: 403 km (250 mi)
- Basin size: 15,075 km^{2} (5,820 sq mi)
- Discharge
  - average: 196 m^{3}/s (6,900 cu ft/s)
  - minimum: 22.3 m^{3}/s (790 cu ft/s)
  - maximum: 1,825 m^{3}/s (64,400 cu ft/s)

Basin features
- Progression: Danube→ Black Sea

The Váh (pronounced [ʋaːx]; German: Waag, pronounced [vaːk]; Hungarian: Vág; Polish: Wag) is the longest river within Slovakia. Towns on the river include Liptovský Hrádok, Liptovský Mikuláš, Ružomberok, Vrútky, Žilina, Bytča, Považská Bystrica, Púchov, Ilava, Dubnica nad Váhom, Nemšová, Trenčín, Nové Mesto nad Váhom, Piešťany, Hlohovec, Sereď, Šaľa, Kolárovo and Komárno.

== Etymology ==
The name is of Germanic or Slavic origin. It could be derived from old Germanic wȃg (stream) or proto-Slavic vagъ, vaga (pole, stick, carved branch) referring to reinforced riverbanks. Several Slavic river names with a similar motivation exist, but pre-Slavic origin of larger rivers in Slovakia is assumed in general. The earliest mentions are flumen Vvaga (1111) and aqua Vvac' (1113).

== Geography ==
A left tributary of the Danube river, the Váh is 406 kilometres (252 mi) long, including its Čierny Váh branch. Its two sources, the Biely Váh (White Váh) and the Čierny Váh (Black Váh), are located in the Vysoké Tatry (High Tatras) and Nízke Tatry (Low Tatra) mountains, respectively, and it flows over northern and western Slovakia and finally feeds into the Danube near Komárno at the border. The left tributaries are Demänovka, Revúca, Ľubochnianka, Turiec, Rajčanka and Nitra rivers, and the right tributaries are Belá, Orava, Varínka, Kysuca, Biela voda, Vlára, Dubová, Dudváh and Malý Dunaj rivers. In late medieval time it was a property of Stibor of Stiboricz and his son Stibor of Beckov of the Clan of Ostoja, later passing to Maurice Benyovszky as a gift of Maria Theresa.

The Váh includes canals, artificial dams (Čierny Váh, Liptovská Mara, Bešeňová, Krpeľany, Žilina, Hričov, Nosice, Sĺňava, Madunice, Kráľová and Selice) and 16 hydropower stations, whose construction started in the 1930s and increased after World War II. The main Slovak limited-access motorway is along the Váh (Bratislava – Trenčín – Považská Bystrica – Žilina and Ružomberok – Poprad), as well as the main railway Bratislava – Žilina – Košice.

== Sources ==
- Rural Development Programme of the SR 2007-2013
