= Ipoly (Ipeľ) Bridges =

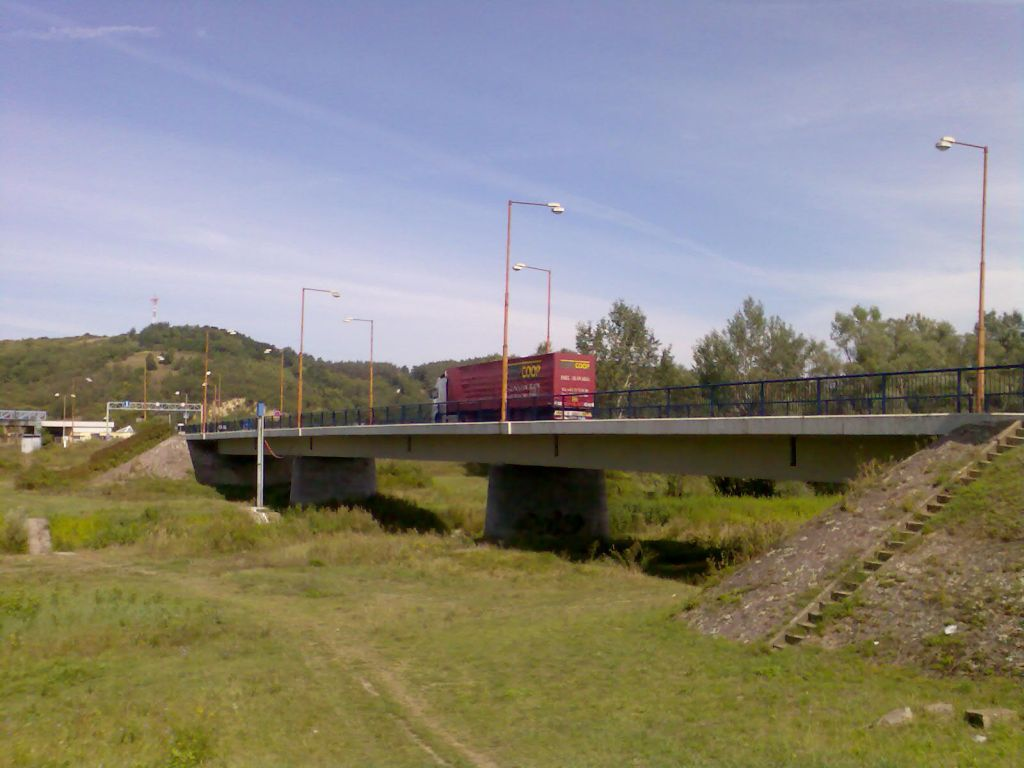
Bridge near Balassagyarmat

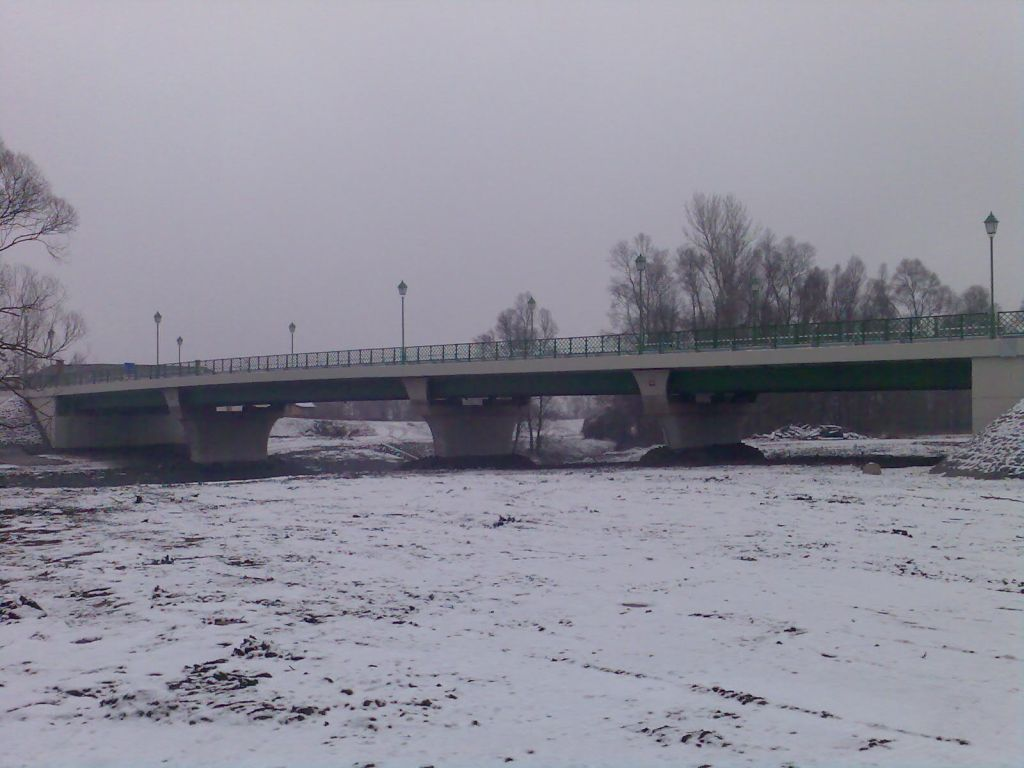
Rebuilt bridge near Szécsény

In the past there were 47 bridges on the Ipoly (Ipeľ) River, but most of them were destroyed in World War II. Recently 10 bridges existed, three railway and seven road bridges. The most well-known are the border crossing road bridges near Balassagyarmat or near Šahy (Ipolyság) (part of European main road E77) and railway bridge near Szob (part of Pan-European Corridor IV.) near the junction of the Ipoly and Danube.

Reconstruction of the destroyed bridges was initiated after the fall of socialism. Concrete plans and permissions have been elaborated in last few years. At the moment there are projects for 9 bridges on ca 100 km long section of the river between Ipolytarnóc and Szob. The first Hungarian – Slovak interstate agreements for building a bridge near the town of Szécsény and another near the village of Nógrádszakál on the upper part of the river were signed in November 2007. In 2009 this project was approved by the Hungary – Slovakia Cross-border Co-operation programme. In March 2010 the constructors were chosen and 2 bridges inaugurated in December 2011 and February 2012. Governments have reached agreement about the rebuilding of another two bridges on lower part of river near Vámosmikola and near Szob, which was opened in July 2023.

After the accession to the European Union and to the Schengen Area local people installed a few foot bridges, mostly in places of former bridges.
