= Hont County =

County of the Kingdom of Hungary

Hont County Comitatus Hontiensis (Latin) Hont vármegye (Hungarian) Komitat Hont (German) Hontianska župa (Slovak)
- County of the Kingdom of Hungary
- 11th century–1923
- Coat of arms

- Capital: Hont; Németi (1619-1629); Korpona; Kemence; Ipolyság (1806-1920); Nagymaros (1920-1923)
- Area
  - Coordinates: 48°4′N 18°57′E
  - 1910: 2,633 km^{2} (1,017 sq mi)
- Population
  - 1910: 132,441
- History
  - Established: 11th century
  - Treaty of Trianon: 4 June 1920
  - Merged into Nógrád-Hont County: 1923
- Today part of: Slovakia (2,171 km^{2}); Hungary (462 km^{2})
- Šahy is the current name of the capital.

Hont County (Note: Hungarian: Hont vármegye, Honth; Latin: Comitatus Hontiensis, Honthum; German: Komitat Hont; Slovak: Hontianska župa) was an administrative county (comitatus) of the Kingdom of Hungary. Most of its territory is now part of Slovakia, while a smaller southern portion is part of Hungary.

Today, in Slovakia Hont is the informal designation of the corresponding territory and an official tourist region.

== Geography ==
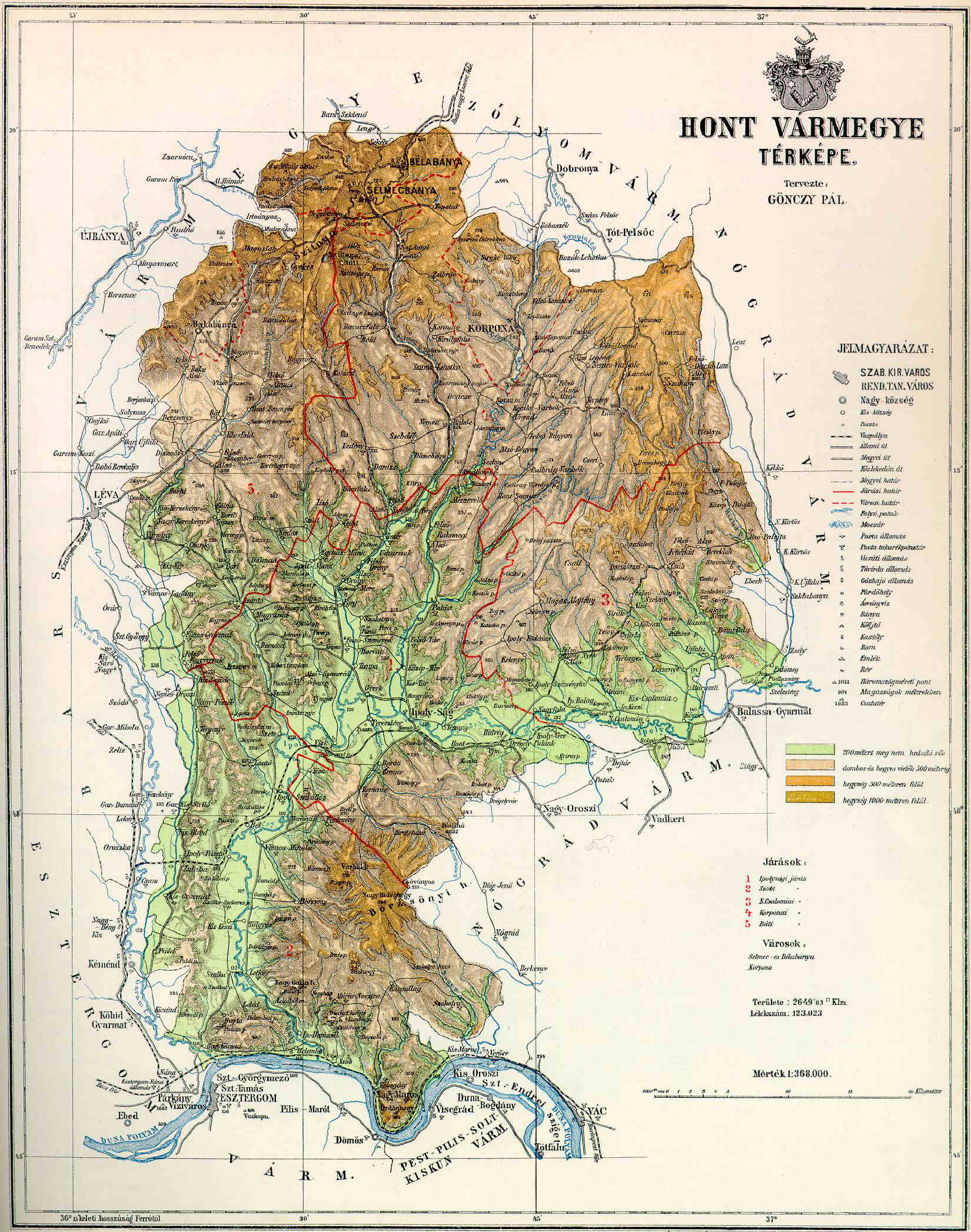
Map of Hont, 1891.

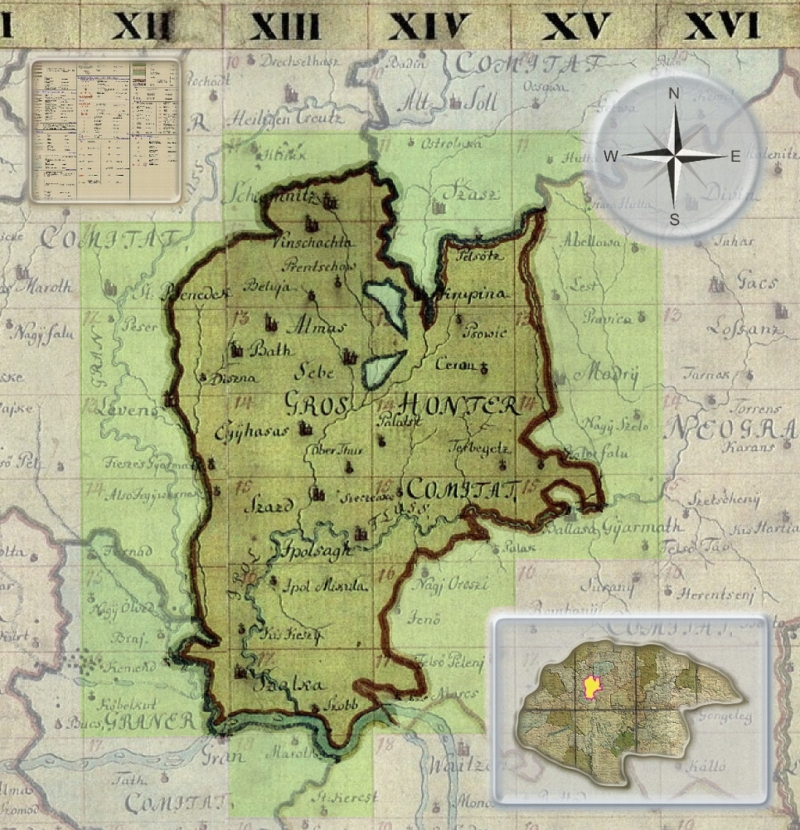
Map of the Hont county, 1782–1785

Hont county shared borders with the counties Bars, Zólyom, Nógrád, Pest-Pilis-Solt-Kiskun and Esztergom. It was situated between Selmecbánya and the Danube river, but the territory around the town of Korpona was added only at the end of the 19th century. The rivers Korpona and Ipoly were the central rivers that flowed through the county. Its area was 2633 km^{2} around 1910.

== Capitals ==
The capitals of the county were the Hont Castle together with Hídvég (present-day Ipeľské Predmostie), then from the 16th century onwards there was no permanent capital, and finally since early 19th century, the capital was Ipolyság (present-day Šahy).

== History ==
The county arose in the 11th century by separation from the Nógrád county. Around the year 1300, the territory of Kishont was added to the territory of the county, but received a special status.

From 1552 to 1685, most of the county was part of the Ottoman Empire and belonged to the administrative unit called Nógrád sandjak.

Changes to the northern border of the county were performed in 1802 (Kishont became part of the Gömör-Kishont county) and then in the late 19th century (above all Korpona was added to the territory).

In the aftermath of World War I, most of Hont county became part of newly formed First Czechoslovak Republic (Czechoslovakia), as recognized by the concerned states in 1920 by the Treaty of Trianon. A small part of the county situated south-east of the river Ipoly/Ipeľ, stayed in Hungary.

In Czechoslovakia, the county continued to exist as the Hont county (Hontianska župa). In 1923, it became part of the Zvolen county. The Hungarian part of Hont merged with the Hungarian part of Nógrád county to form Nógrád-Hont county in 1923.

In 1928, it became part of the newly created Slovak Land (Slovenská krajina/zem). After the First Vienna Award, between 1938 and 1945, it was united with the redeemed parts of former Bars and Hont counties to form Bars-Hont county with the capital of Léva. The remaining northern part became part of the newly created Hron county (1940–1945) of the Slovak Republic. After World War II, the Trianon borders were restored and Nógrád-Hont County was reformed on her remnants in Hungary. In 1949, the Czechoslovak part became part of the newly created Nitra region and Banská Bystrica region of Czechoslovakia (Fourth Czechoslovak Republic), while the Hungarian part was eventually merged into newly formed Pest County in 1950. In 1960, the Czechoslovak part became part of the newly created Western Slovak and Central Slovak regions. In 1993, Czechoslovakia was split and in 1996 its territory became part of the newly created Nitra and Banská Bystrica regions of Slovakia.

== Demographics ==
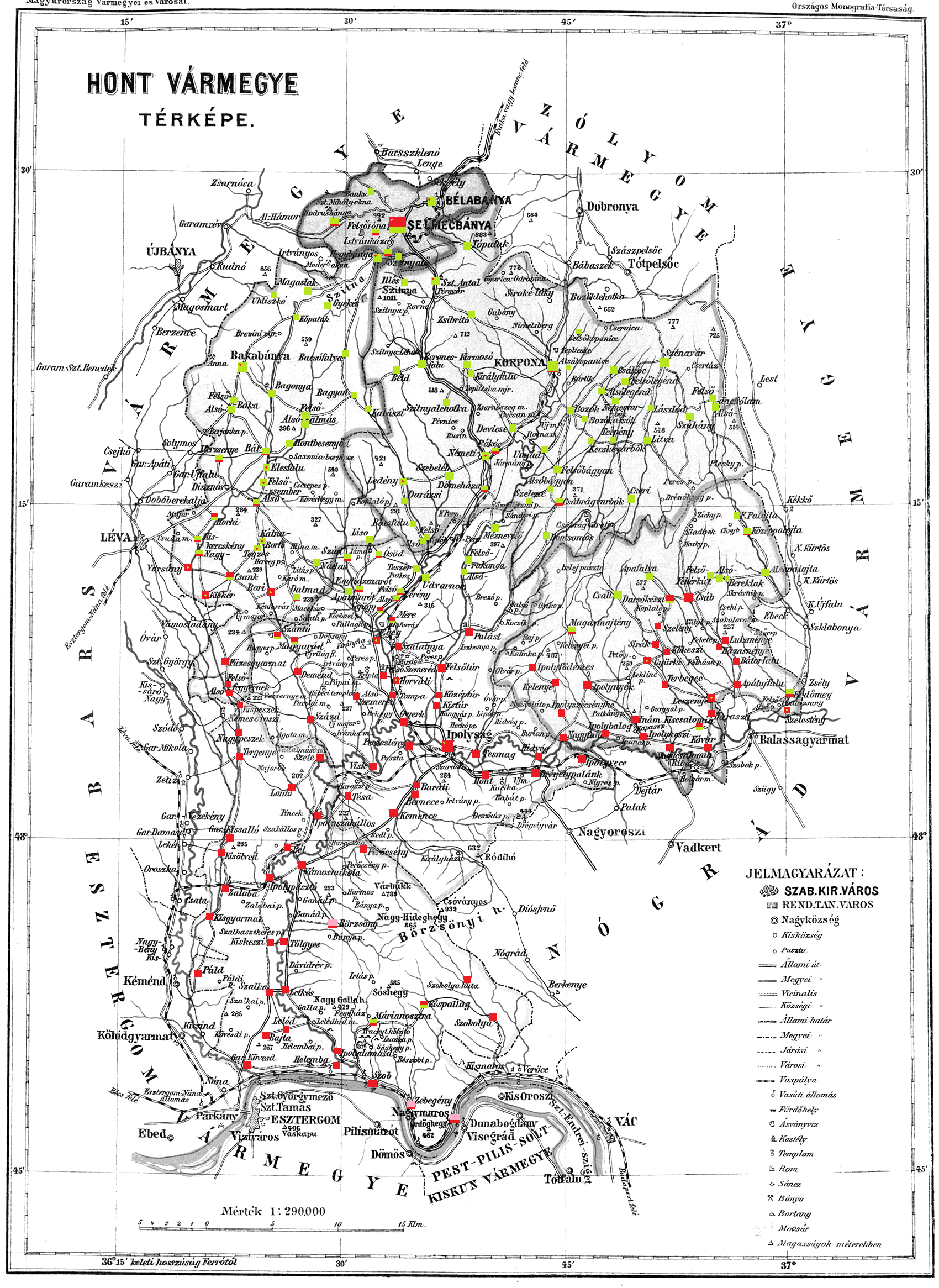
Ethnic map of the county with data of the 1910 census (see the key in the description).

Population by mother tongue (Note: Only linguistic communities > 1% are displayed.)
Census	Total	Hungarian	Slovak	German	Other or unknown
1880	116,080	49,170 (43.83%)	54,484 (48.56%)	7,952 (7.09%)	590 (0.53%)
1890	123,023	58,155 (47.27%)	56,529 (45.95%)	7,602 (6.18%)	737 (0.60%)
1900	130,734	65,522 (50.12%)	57,315 (43.84%)	7,051 (5.39%)	846 (0.65%)
1910	132,441	73,215 (55.28%)	51,522 (38.90%)	6,417 (4.85%)	1,287 (0.97%)

Population by religion (Note: Only religious communities > 1% are displayed.)
Census	Total	Roman Catholic	Lutheran	Calvinist	Jewish	Other or unknown
1880	116,080	79,044 (68.09%)	26,397 (22.74%)	7,565 (6.52%)	2,908 (2.51%)	166 (0.14%)
1890	123,023	84,983 (69.08%)	26,892 (21.86%)	7,813 (6.35%)	3,199 (2.60%)	136 (0.11%)
1900	130,734	91,965 (70.35%)	26,845 (20.53%)	8,437 (6.45%)	3,305 (2.53%)	182 (0.14%)
1910	132,441	94,896 (71.65%)	25,785 (19.47%)	8,339 (6.30%)	3,180 (2.40%)	241 (0.18%)

== Subdivisions ==
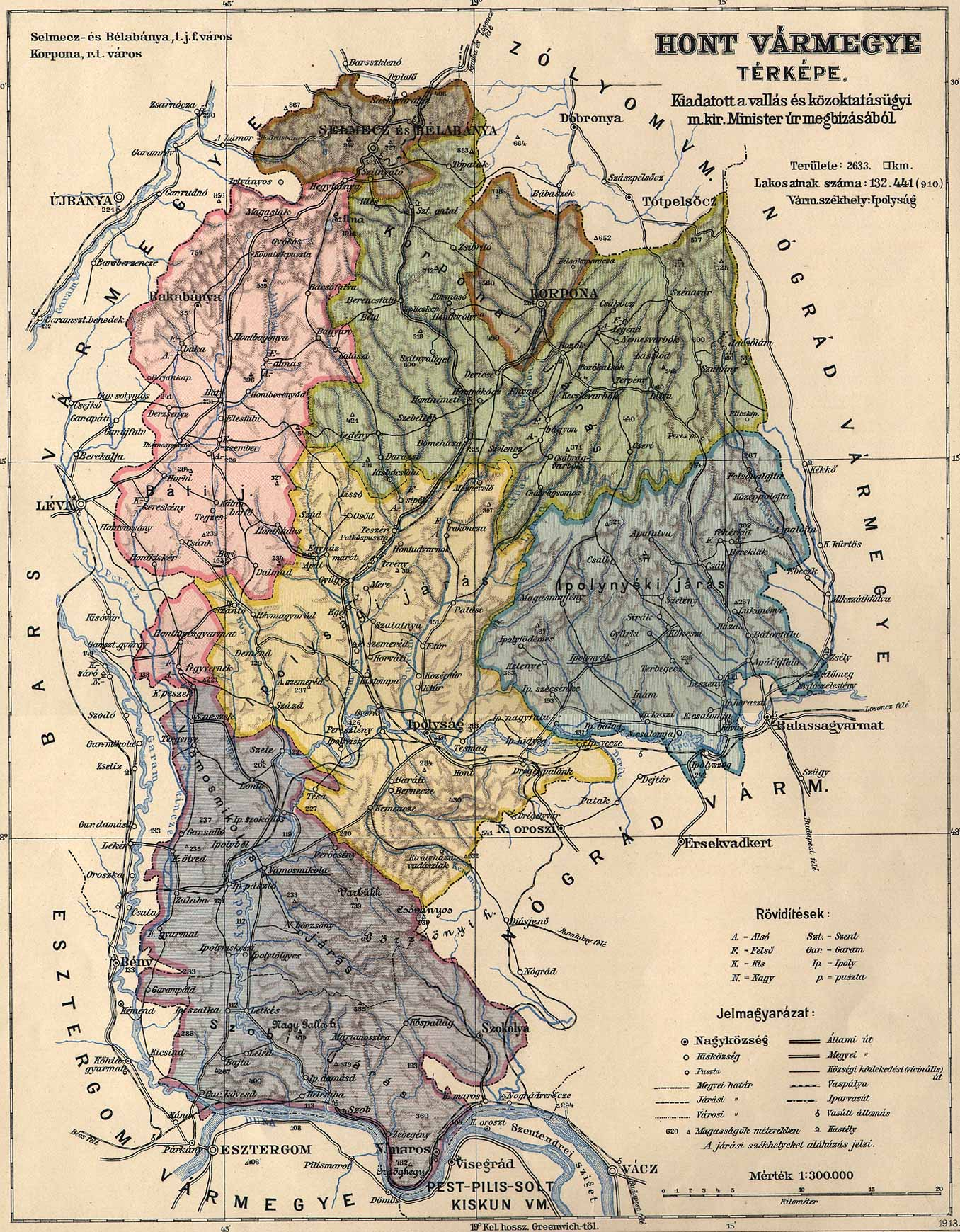

Until 1802, the county consisted of 3 processuses (in Slovak slúžnovské okresy; a type of districts led by "iudices nobilium") plus the Kishont district. In 1802, when Kishont was removed, the county was divided in four new processus.

In the early 20th century, the subdivisions of Hont county were:

Districts (járás)
District	Capital
Bát	Bát (now Bátovce)
Ipolynyék	Ipolynyék (now Vinica)
Ipolyság	Ipolyság (now Šahy)
Korpona	Korpona (now Krupina)
Szob	Szob
Vámosmikola (from 1907)	Vámosmikola
Urban counties (törvényhatósági jogú város)
Selmec- és Bélabánya (now Banská Štiavnica and Banská Belá)
Urban districts (rendezett tanácsú város)
Korpona (now Krupina)

The towns of Vámosmikola and Szob are now in Hungary.

== See also ==
- Alajos Szokolyi
