= Ipeľ =

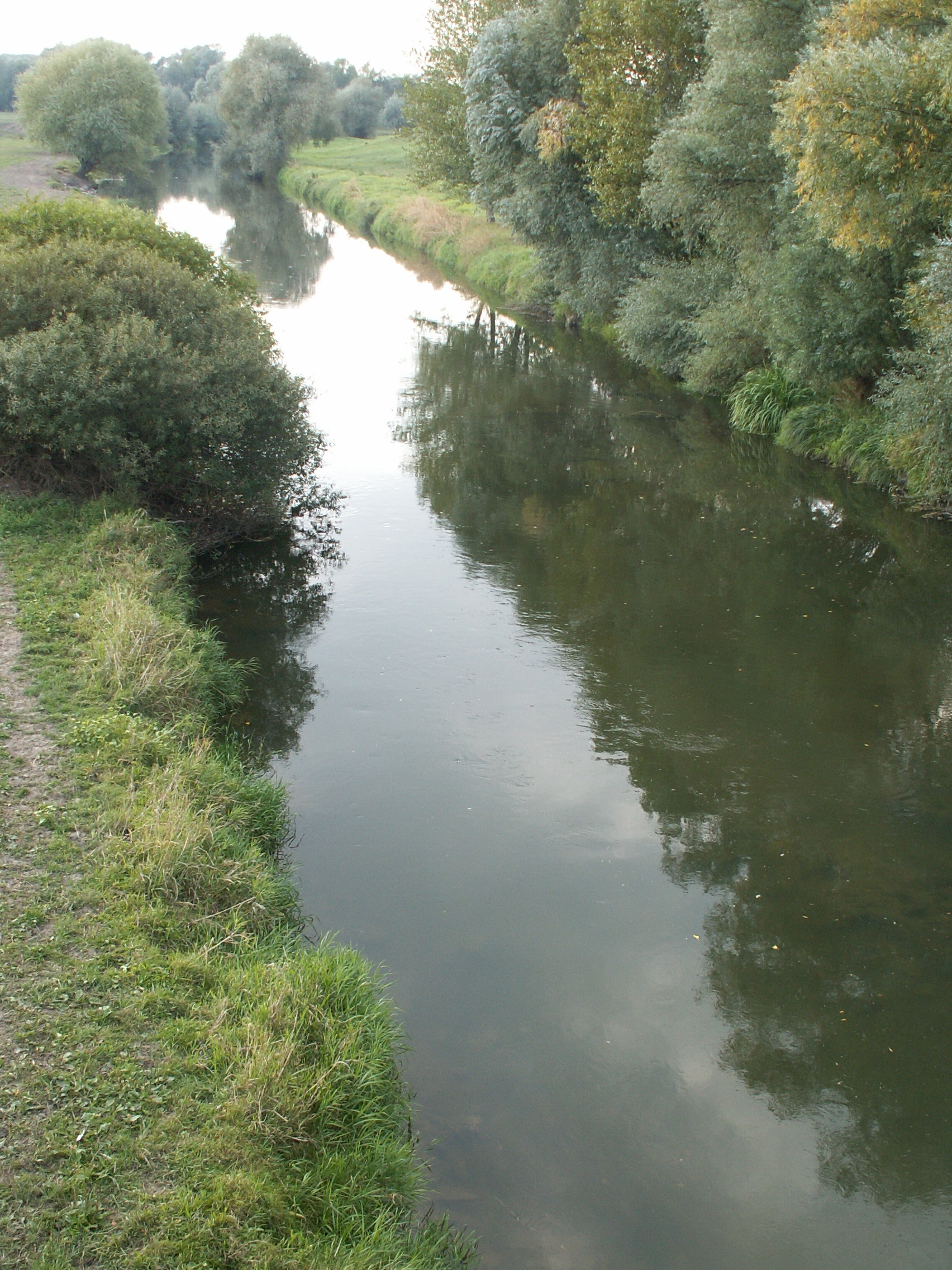
- Ipeľ river near Šahy

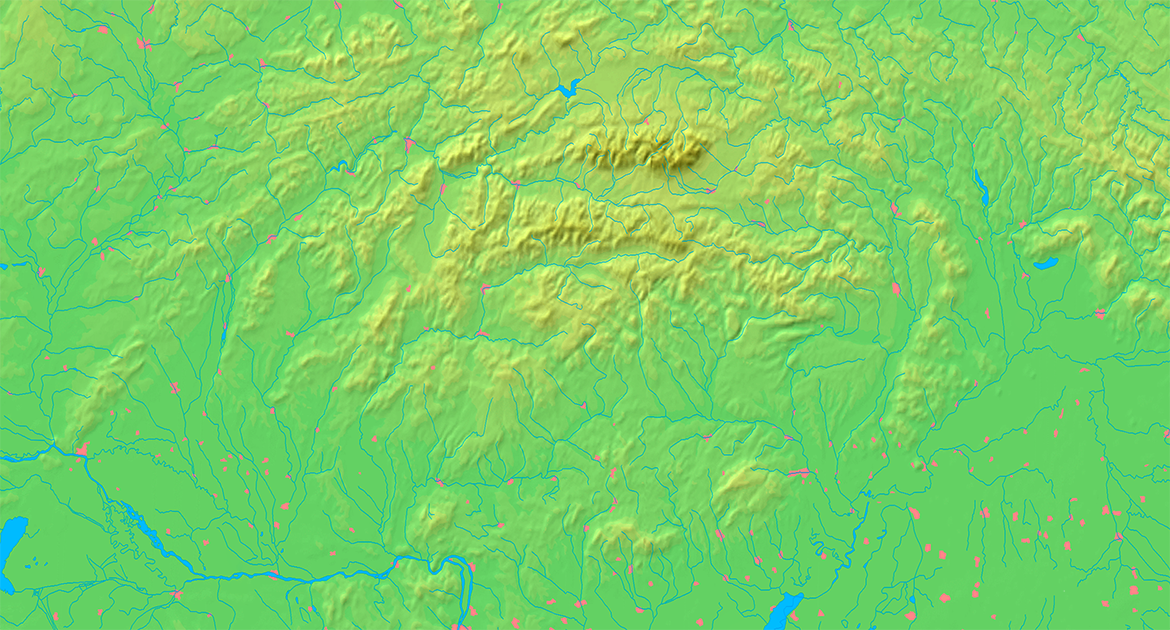
- Current and watershed of the Ipeľ River in Slovakia and Hungary
- Native name: Ipeľ (Slovak); Ipoly (Hungarian)

Location
- Countries: Slovakia and Hungary

Physical characteristics
- Source
  - location: Lom nad Rimavicou, Slovakia
- Mouth: Danube River
  - location: Chľaba/Szob
  - coordinates: 47.8182°N 18.8485°E
- Length: 232 km (144 mi)
- Basin size: 5,151 km^{2} (1,989 sq mi)
- Discharge
  - location: mouth
  - average: 21 m^{3}/s (740 cu ft/s)
  - minimum: 3 m^{3}/s (110 cu ft/s)
  - maximum: 70 m^{3}/s (2,500 cu ft/s)

Basin features
- Tributaries
  - right: Tisovník, Krtíš, Krupinica, Štiavnica
- Progression: Danube→ Black Sea

The Ipeľ (Slovak; pronounced [ˈipeʎ]) or Ipoly (Hungarian) (German: Eipel, archaic Slovak: Jupoľ, Latin: Bolia) is a 232-kilometre (144 mi) long river in Slovakia and Hungary, a tributary of the Danube River. Its source is in central Slovakia in the Slovak Ore Mountains. It flows south to the Hungarian border and the Slovakia-Hungary border, and then southwest, west, and again south along the border until it flows into the Danube near Szob.

The Ipeľ flows through or creates the border of the Banská Bystrica and Nitra regions in Slovakia, and Nógrád and Pest counties in Hungary.

== Towns and villages ==
The following towns and villages are situated on the river, in downstream order:

- Poltár (SK)
- Kalinovo (SK)
- Boľkovce (SK)
- Ipolytarnóc (HU)
- Litke (HU)
- Nógrádszakál (HU)
- Szécsény (HU)
- Balassagyarmat (HU)
- Ipolyvece (HU)
- Ipeľské Predmostie (SK)
- Šahy (SK)
- Vámosmikola (HU)
- Pastovce (SK)
- Ipolytölgyes (HU)
- Salka (SK)
- Letkés (HU)
- Ipolydamásd (HU)
- Szob (HU)

== See also ==
- Ipoly (Ipeľ) Bridges
