= Yerachmiel Dov Baneth =

Hungarian rabbi (1815–1871)

Personal life
- Born: 1815 Szécsény or Paks, Hungary
- Died: 21 October 1871 (aged 55–56)
- Spouse: Golde Stössl (m. 1840)
- Children: Eduard Baneth

Religious life
- Religion: Judaism

Yerachmiel Dov (Bernhard) Baneth (Hebrew: ירחמיאל דוב בער בנעט; 1815 – October 21, 1871) was a Hungarian rabbi.

== Biography ==
Yerachmiel Dov Baneth was born into a rabbinic ramily in Szécsény or Paks, the youngest son of Ezekiel Baneth. After studying Talmud under his father, he attended for some time the lectures by Rabbi Moses Sofer of Presburg.

In 1840 he married Golde, the daughter of merchant David Stössl of Liptó-Szent-Miklós, and settled in that town. There he dedicated himself to Talmudic study, earning a reputation for scholarship that attracted many devoted pupils. In 1868 he assumed the position of rabbi of the Orthodox congregation of Liptó-Szent-Miklós.

Baneth died in 1871, leaving behind a manuscript volume containing notes on the Talmud.
