= Šahy =

Šahy Ipolyság
- Municipality
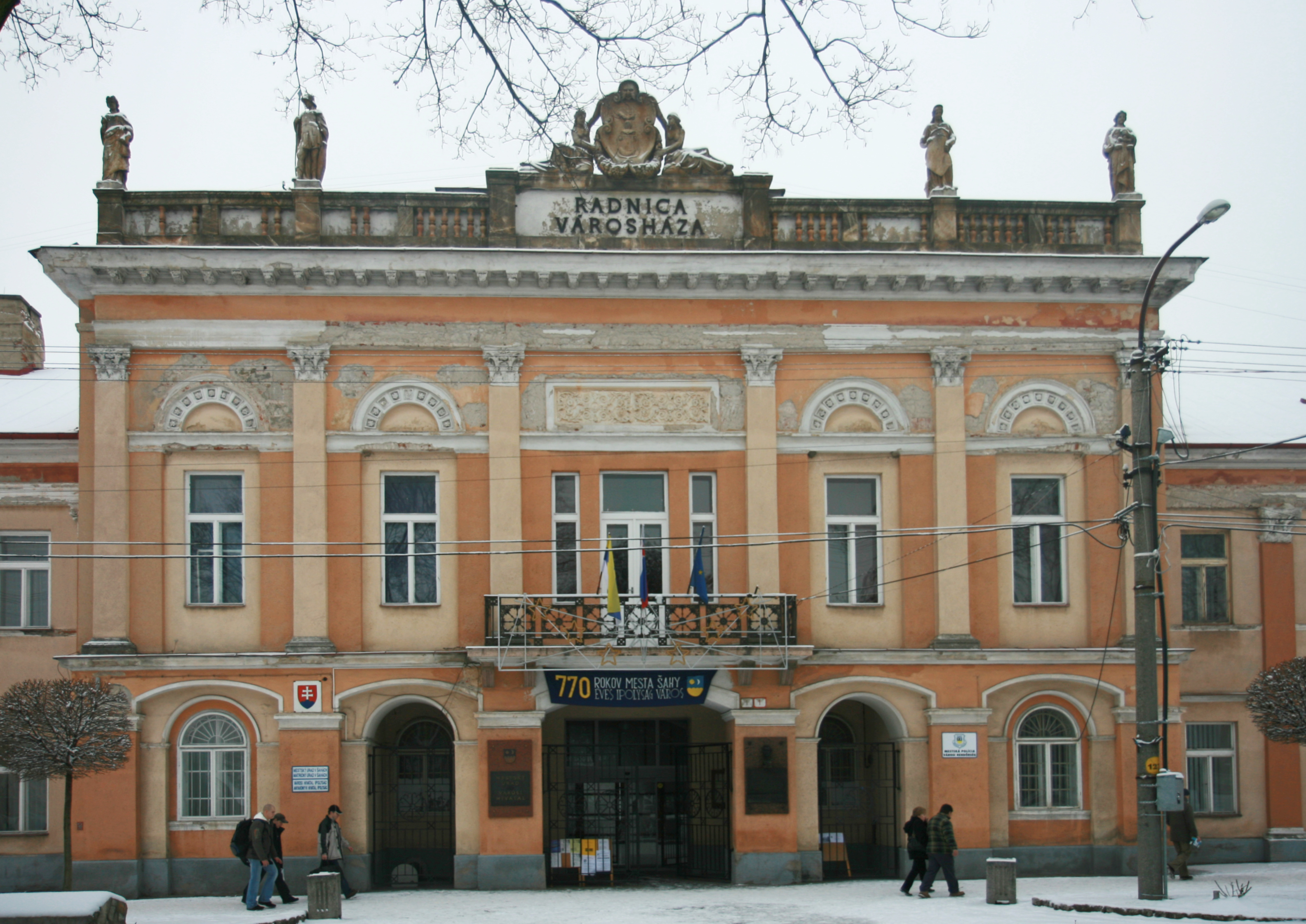
- Town hall, a former guildhall

- Flag Coat of arms

- Location of Šahy in the Nitra Region Location of Šahy in Slovakia
- Coordinates: 48.07°N 18.95°E
- Country: Slovakia
- Region: Nitra Region
- District: Levice District
- First mentioned: 1237

Government
  - Mayor: Pál Zachar

Area
  - Total: 50.92 km^{2} (19.66 sq mi)
- Elevation: 135 m (443 ft)

Population (2025)
  - Total: 6,857
- Time zone: UTC+1 (CET)
  - Summer (DST): UTC+2 (CEST)
- Postal code: 936 01
- Area code: +421 36
- Vehicle registration plate (until 2022): LV
- Website: www.sahy.sk

Šahy (Hungarian: Ipolyság, rarely German: Eipelschlag) is a town in southern Slovakia, The town has an ethnic Hungarian majority and its population is 7,238 people (2018), with an average age of 42.5.

== Geography ==
The municipality lies at an altitude of 135 metres (443 ft) and covers an area of 50.92 km^{2} (19.66 sq mi) (2025).

It is located at the eastern reaches of the Danubian Lowland on the river Ipeľ at the Hungarian border, on the E77 road from Budapest to Kraków. Besides the main settlement, it also has two "boroughs" of Preseľany nad Ipľom (4 km (2.49 mi) west of centre, annexed 1980) and Tešmák (3 km (1.86 mi) east of centre, annexed 1986). From 1980 to 1996 it also had now independent village of Hrkovce.

== History ==
The first written mention is from 1237 in a document of King Béla IV under name Saag, when Martin Hont-Pázmány founded a Premonstratensian monastery there. It got character of a small town in the 14th century. It was part of Ottoman Empire between 1541–1595 and 1605–1685 and was known as "Şefradi". It was also sanjak centre in Uyvar eyalet between 1663 and 1685. Before break-up of Austria-Hungary in 1918/1920 and incorporation into Czechoslovakia, it was part of the Hont County, and was from 1806 its capital. It was part of Hungary from 1938 to 1945 as a result of the First Vienna Award.

== Population ==
Population statistic (10 years)
Year	1995	2005	2015	2025
Count	8502	7973	7463	6857
Difference		−6.22%	−6.39%	−8.12%

Population statistic
Year	2024	2025
Count	6919	6857
Difference		−0.89%

It has a population of 6857 people (31 December 2025).

=== Ethnicity ===
Census 2021 (1+ %)
Ethnicity	Number	Fraction
Hungarian	4357	59.95%
Slovak	2794	38.44%
Not found out	473	6.5%
Total	7267	

In year 2021 was 7267 people by ethnicity 4357 as Hungarian, 2794 as Slovak, 473 as Not found out, 54 as Romani, 27 as Other, 17 as Czech, 8 as Italian, 6 as Polish, 4 as German, 2 as Vietnamese, 2 as Ukrainian, 2 as Moravian, 1 as Chinese, 1 as Serbian, 1 as Russian, 1 as Romanian, 1 as Austrian and 1 as French.

Note on population: The difference values of population numbers in the table "Population statistic" and in the sections "Ethnicity" & "Religion" is caused by the use of various statistical methods.

=== Religion ===
Census 2021 (1+ %)
Religion	Number	Fraction
Roman Catholic Church	5131	70.61%
None	1110	15.27%
Not found out	563	7.75%
Evangelical Church	204	2.81%
Calvinist Church	102	1.4%
Total	7267	

In year 2021 was 7267 people by religion 5131 from Roman Catholic Church, 1110 from None, 563 from Not found out, 204 from Evangelical Church, 102 from Calvinist Church, 46 from Christian Congregations in Slovakia, 34 from Greek Catholic Church, 18 from Jehovah's Witnesses, 12 from Islam, 12 from Other, 9 from Ad hoc movements, 8 from Other and not ascertained christian church, 5 from Old Catholic Church, 5 from Buddhism, 4 from United Methodist Church, 2 from Eastern Orthodox Church and 2 from Hinduism.

According to the 2014 census, the town had 7,516 inhabitants. In 2001 62.21% of the inhabitants were Hungarians, 34.57% Slovaks, 0.56% Czech and 0.41 Roma. The religious makeup was 84.06% Roman Catholics, 6.87% people with no religious affiliation, and 3.46% Lutherans.

== Facilities ==
The town is home to the Hont Museum and Gallery of Ľudovít Simony.

== Twin towns – sister cities ==
Šahy is twinned with:

- Héhalom, Hungary
- Vác, Hungary
- Veresegyház, Hungary

== Notable people ==
- Ferdinand Daučík, football player and manager
- Branko Kubala, football player
- Ladislav Ballek, writer
