= Gudbrand Gregersen de Saág =

Hungarian engineer (1824–1910)

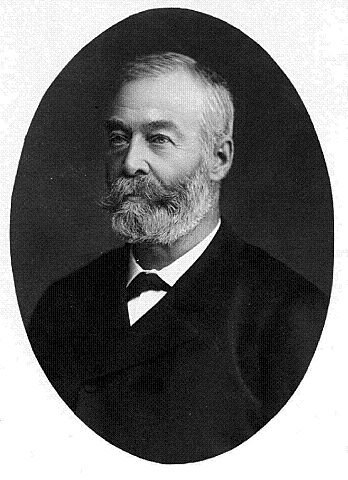
- Born: Gudbrand Gregersen; 17 April 1824; Modum, Norway
- Died: 24 December 1910 (aged 86); Szob, Austria-Hungary
- Other names: Guilbrand Gregersen de Saág; Gudbrand Gregersen
- Occupation: Architect
- Spouse: Aloyzia Sümegh
- Children: ~19

Gudbrand Gregersen de Saág (born Gudbrand Gregersen; Hungarian: saági Gregersen Guilbrand; 17 April 1824 – 24 December 1910) was a Norwegian-born Hungarian bridge engineer, architect and member of the Hungarian nobility from 1884.

== Biography ==
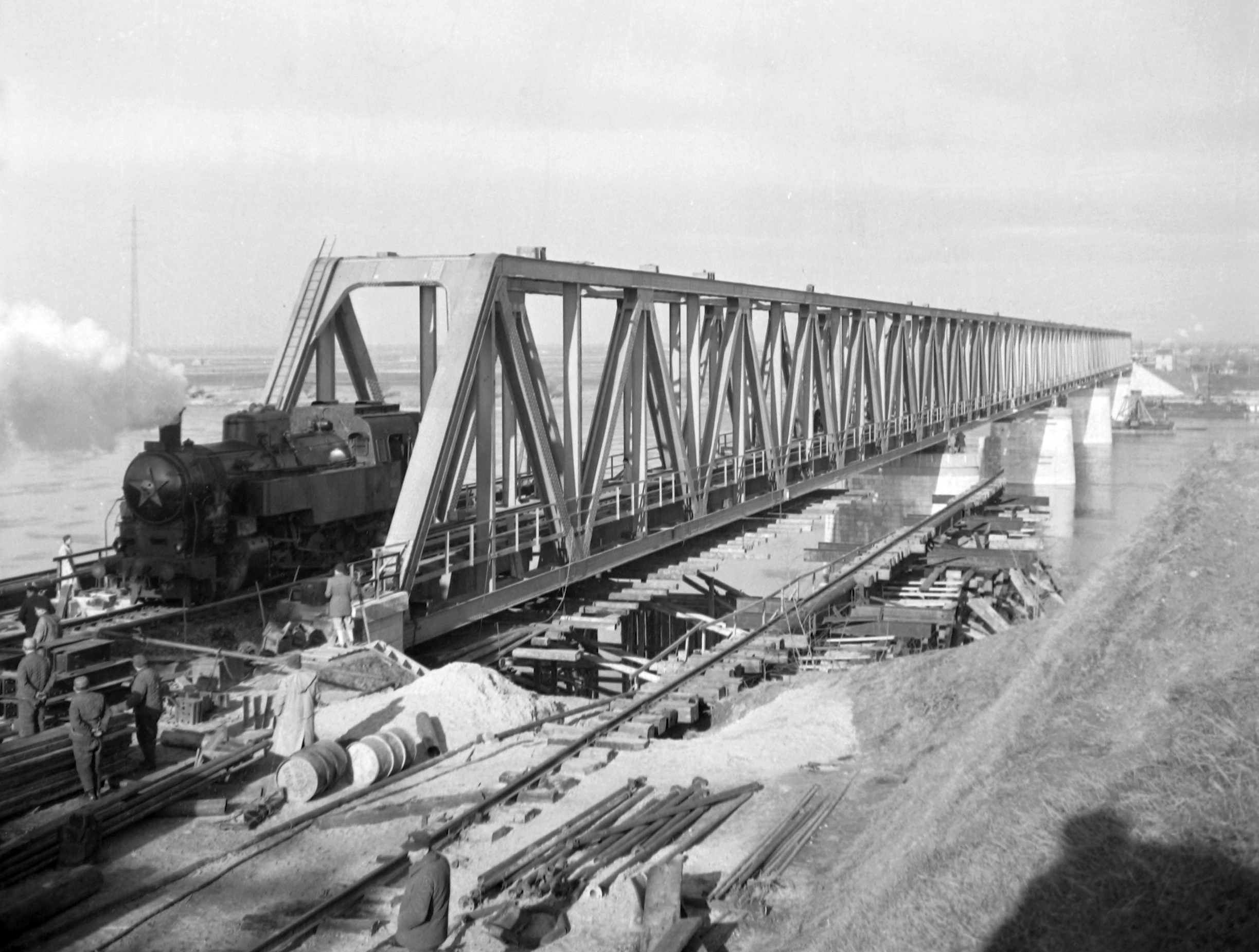
The construction of the Elisabeth Bridge in Komárom, Hungary on the River Danube (today between the cities of Komárom, Hungary and Komárno, Slovakia)

Gregersen was born on 17 April 1824 to farmer Nils Gregersen (1804–1868) and Anne Trulsdatter (1803–1838) in Modum, Norway.

A young man and a crafter, Gregersen came to Budapest, Habsburg Empire in the 1850s, where he established a company within general contracting. After a few years, the company had become one of the leading in the Kingdom.

Living in Szob, Gregersen was married with Aloyzia (Luise) Sümegh (1836–1906), a daughter of Josef Sümegh and Katharina Stitz. They had 19 children together, of whom seven died as infants.

Gregersen designed the Elisabeth Bridge between the two parts of the city of Komárom, Austria-Hungary (today between the cities of Komárom, Hungary and Komárno, Slovakia. He also designed and lead the carpenter works on the building of the Hungarian Parliament and the Museum of Fine Arts and on the former building of the National Theatre in Budapest.

In 1884, Gregersen with wife and (some) children were ennobled by Francis Joseph, Apostolic King of Hungary. They were also granted a coat of arms which, in the upper field, displays the Norwegian Lion.

Gregersen died on 24 December 1910 in Szob, Hungary, aged 86. He remained a Lutheran all his life.

== See also ==
- Hungarian nobility

== Literature ==
Norwegian

- Norwegian Biographical Encyclopædia: Gudbrand Gregersen Saági
- Drammens Tidende: Bondesønn ble nasjonalhelt
- Økonomisk Rapport: Portrettet: Adelig og følsom
- Sveaas, P.A.: Familien Gregersen og Gudbrand Gregersen, ungarsk adelsmann fra Modum

Hungarian

- Evangélikus Országos Múzeum: Gregersen, Gudbrand
