= László Antal =

Hungarian linguist

- Born: 25 June 1930; Szob, Hungary
- Died: January 1993 (aged 62); Washington
- Citizenship: Hungary
- Education: Eötvös Loránd University (ELTE)
- Known for: Structural linguistics
- Scientific career
- Fields: Linguistics; Structural linguistics
- Workplaces: Department of General Linguistics, ELTE, Budapest

László Antal was a Hungarian linguist, structuralist, Doctor of Science (1981), and Professor of Linguistics. He was considered the sole representative of structural linguistics in America in Hungary. He adapted American structuralism to the Hungarian language. He was a lone wolf in Hungarian linguistics.

== Life ==
Antal was born in Szob, Hungary on 25 June 1930. In 1962, he was awarded a Ford Scholarship to the United States in the academic years of 1964–1965. He was a visiting professor in Berlin between 1981 and 1986. He left Hungary first for Germany then for the United States in 1985 when he was appointed to the head of the General Linguistics Department in ELTE in Budapest. He settled in Manassas, Virginia. He was a professor in the Foreign Service Institute and an advisor at the Jamestown Foundation. He died in Washington, D.C., of a heart attack, in 1993. He spoke several languages, such as English, German, Russian, French, Albanian, Arabic, and Indonesian, fluently.

== Selected works ==
This bibliography contains only the works that were published in English.

=== Books ===
- Antal, László 1963: Questions of Meaning, Mouton, The Hague.
- Antal, László 1964: Content, Meaning, and Understanding, Mouton. The Hague.

=== Papers ===
- Antal, László 1961: Sign, Meaning, Context, Lingua 10, 211-9.
- Antal, László 1963: A new type of dictionary, Linguistics 1, 75-84.
- Antal, László (1988). "Rules, Analogies, Categories". Word. 1988 (39): 21–27. doi:10.1080/00437956.1988.11435780.
- Antal, László. "Langue And Parole or Only Parole?". Historiographia Linguistica. 1990 (17): 357–367.
- Antal, László (1991). "Multiple Syntactic Relations: a Tentative Note". Word. 1991 (42): 89–94. doi:10.1080/00437956.1991.11435833.
- Antal, László 1992: Another calamity of quotas. N.h. [New York], é.n.
