= Branko Kubala =

Spanish footballer

Personal information
- Full name: Branislav Kubala Daučík
- Date of birth: 10 January 1949
- Place of birth: Šahy, Czechoslovakia
- Date of death: 25 February 2018 (aged 69)
- Place of death: Reus, Spain
- Height: 1.71 m (5 ft 7 1/2 in)
- Position: Striker

Youth career
- 1961: Real Betis
- 1962–1964: AC Milan

Senior career*
Years	Team	Apps	(Gls)
1964–1965	Espanyol	2	(0)
1965–1967	Sabadell		
1967–1968	Toronto Falcons	21	(3)
1968	St. Louis Stars	2	(0)
1968	Dallas Tornado	9	(4)
1970–1971	Cartagena		
1971–1972	Sant Andreu	0	(0)
1972–1973	Atlético Malagueño		
Total		34	(7)
- * Club domestic league appearances and goals

Branislav Kubala Daučík (10 January 1949 – 25 February 2018) was a Spanish professional footballer who played as a striker.

== Early and personal life ==
Kubala was born in Šahy, Czechoslovakia, the eldest of three sons of László Kubala and Violeta Daučíkova. Violeta was the sister of Ferdinand Daučík and the aunt of Yanko Daucik. The family moved to Barcelona, Spain soon after his birth.

== Career ==
Kubala spent time with the Real Betis youth team in 1961, before joining the AC Milan academy in Italy, where he spent two seasons. Upon his return to Barcelona he played with Espanyol, making his professional debut on 3 April 1965 at the age of 16 years 83 days, a league record for the youngest player. After one further appearance, he then played for Sabadell, before moving to North America with his family, where he played for the Toronto Falcons, the St. Louis Stars, and the Dallas Tornado. After returning to Spain to undertake military service, he played for Cartagena, Sant Andreu and Atlético Malagueño, before retiring at the age of 24.

== Later life and death ==
He died on 25 February 2018.
