= Boľkovce =

Boľkovce Bolyk
- Municipality
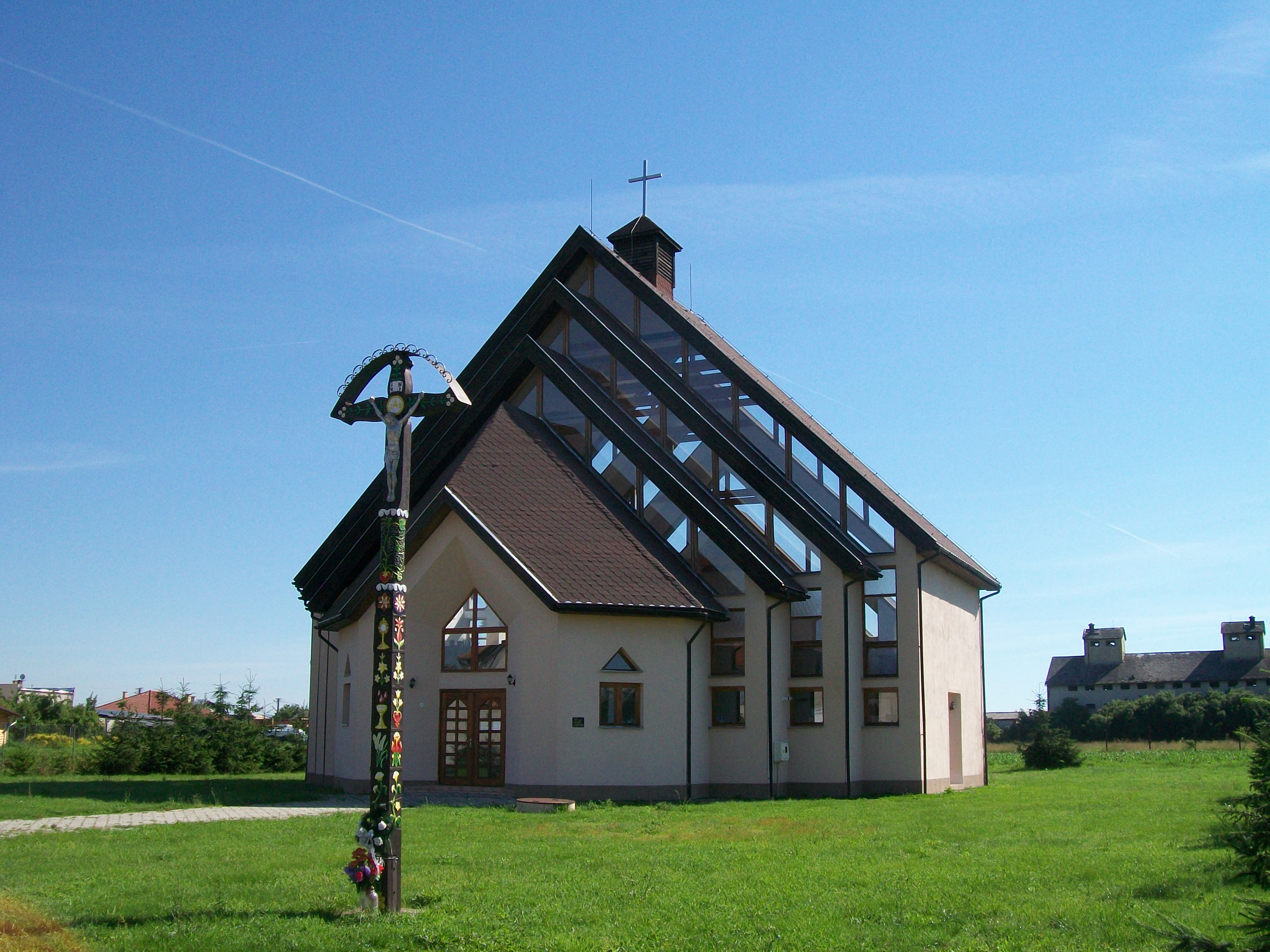
- Roman Catholic church in Boľkovce (local part Osada)

- Flag Coat of arms

- Location of Boľkovce in the Banská Bystrica Region Location of Boľkovce in Slovakia
- Coordinates: 48.33°N 19.78°E
- Country: Slovakia
- Region: Banská Bystrica Region
- District: Lučenec District
- First mentioned: 1320

Area
  - Total: 10.99 km^{2} (4.24 sq mi)
- Elevation: 186 m (610 ft)

Population (2025)
  - Total: 623
- Time zone: UTC+1 (CET)
  - Summer (DST): UTC+2 (CEST)
- Postal code: 984 01
- Area code: +421 47
- Vehicle registration plate (until 2022): LC
- Website: www.bolkovce.sk

Boľkovce (before 1948: Bolyk; Hungarian: Bolyk or Ipolybolyk) is a village and municipality in the Lučenec District in the Banská Bystrica Region of Slovakia.

== Geography ==
The municipality lies at an altitude of 186 metres (610 ft) and covers an area of 10.99 km^{2} (4.24 sq mi) (2025).

== History ==
In historical records, the village was first mentioned in 1320 and 1435 as Bolk (1467 Bwlyk, 1481 Bolyk). In 1481, it belonged to Divín Castle lords and later on to the Somoskő lords. In the mid-16th century it was occupied and destroyed by the Ottoman Turks, from 1938 to 1945 by Hungary.

== Climate ==
Climate data for Boľkovce (1991−2020)
Month	Jan	Feb	Mar	Apr	May	Jun	Jul	Aug	Sep	Oct	Nov	Dec	Year
Record high °C (°F)	15.4 (59.7)	19.3 (66.7)	24.4 (75.9)	30.4 (86.7)	32.2 (90.0)	35.8 (96.4)	39.2 (102.6)	37.5 (99.5)	34.7 (94.5)	27.6 (81.7)	21.7 (71.1)	14.2 (57.6)	39.2 (102.6)
Mean daily maximum °C (°F)	1.6 (34.9)	5.0 (41.0)	10.8 (51.4)	17.6 (63.7)	22.5 (72.5)	25.7 (78.3)	27.7 (81.9)	27.7 (81.9)	22.0 (71.6)	15.5 (59.9)	8.5 (47.3)	2.0 (35.6)	15.6 (60.1)
Daily mean °C (°F)	−1.8 (28.8)	0.2 (32.4)	4.9 (40.8)	10.9 (51.6)	15.6 (60.1)	19.2 (66.6)	20.8 (69.4)	20.3 (68.5)	15.1 (59.2)	9.6 (49.3)	4.5 (40.1)	−0.9 (30.4)	9.9 (49.8)
Mean daily minimum °C (°F)	−5.2 (22.6)	−4.0 (24.8)	−0.4 (31.3)	4.0 (39.2)	9.0 (48.2)	12.4 (54.3)	14.0 (57.2)	13.7 (56.7)	9.5 (49.1)	5.0 (41.0)	1.2 (34.2)	−3.8 (25.2)	4.6 (40.3)
Record low °C (°F)	−25.4 (−13.7)	−22.0 (−7.6)	−16.2 (2.8)	−10.6 (12.9)	−2.5 (27.5)	2.8 (37.0)	5.5 (41.9)	3.0 (37.4)	−1.2 (29.8)	−10.0 (14.0)	−13.3 (8.1)	−26.1 (−15.0)	−26.1 (−15.0)
Average precipitation mm (inches)	30.7 (1.21)	31.6 (1.24)	30.3 (1.19)	39.6 (1.56)	69.8 (2.75)	76.6 (3.02)	88.6 (3.49)	66.1 (2.60)	47.8 (1.88)	47.9 (1.89)	47.0 (1.85)	37.2 (1.46)	612.9 (24.13)
Average precipitation days (≥ 1.0 mm)	5.7	5.8	5.8	6.3	9.5	8.8	8.3	7.1	6.4	6.7	7.5	6.6	84.4
Average snowy days	8.7	7.0	3.5	0.4	0.0	0.0	0.0	0.0	0.0	0.1	2.6	6.1	28.5
Average relative humidity (%)	84.8	79.3	69.7	63.7	68.0	68.0	67.1	69.2	73.5	80.8	85.2	87.2	74.7
Mean monthly sunshine hours	63.5	95.2	156.8	207.4	244.1	258.2	273.4	264.3	183.6	129.9	68.3	49.9	1,994.6
Source: NOAA

== Population ==
Population statistic (10 years)
Year	1995	2005	2015	2025
Count	630	670	631	623
Difference		+6.34%	−5.82%	−1.26%

Population statistic
Year	2024	2025
Count	626	623
Difference		−0.47%

It has a population of 623 people (31 December 2025).

=== Ethnicity ===
Census 2021 (1+ %)
Ethnicity	Number	Fraction
Slovak	531	83.49%
Hungarian	109	17.13%
Not found out	13	2.04%
Total	636	

In year 2021 was 636 people by ethnicity 531 as Slovak, 109 as Hungarian, 13 as Not found out, 6 as Romani, 4 as Rusyn, 3 as Czech, 2 as Russian, 2 as German and 1 as Austrian.

Note on population: The difference values of population numbers in the table "Population statistic" and in the sections "Ethnicity" & "Religion" is caused by the use of various statistical methods.

=== Religion ===
Census 2021 (1+ %)
Religion	Number	Fraction
Roman Catholic Church	426	66.98%
None	133	20.91%
Evangelical Church	38	5.97%
Not found out	15	2.36%
Greek Catholic Church	9	1.42%
Jehovah's Witnesses	8	1.26%
Total	636	

In year 2021 was 636 people by religion 426 from Roman Catholic Church, 133 from None, 38 from Evangelical Church, 15 from Not found out, 9 from Greek Catholic Church, 8 from Jehovah's Witnesses, 5 from Other, 1 from Eastern Orthodox Church and 1 from Apostolic Church.

== Genealogical resources ==
The records for genealogical research are available at the state archive "Statny Archiv in Banska Bystrica, Slovakia"

- Roman Catholic church records (births/marriages/deaths): 1802-1895 (parish A)
- Lutheran church records (births/marriages/deaths): 1783-1895 (parish B)

== See also ==
- List of municipalities and towns in Slovakia
