= Hrkovce =

Municipality of Slovakia

Hrkovce Gyerk
- Municipality
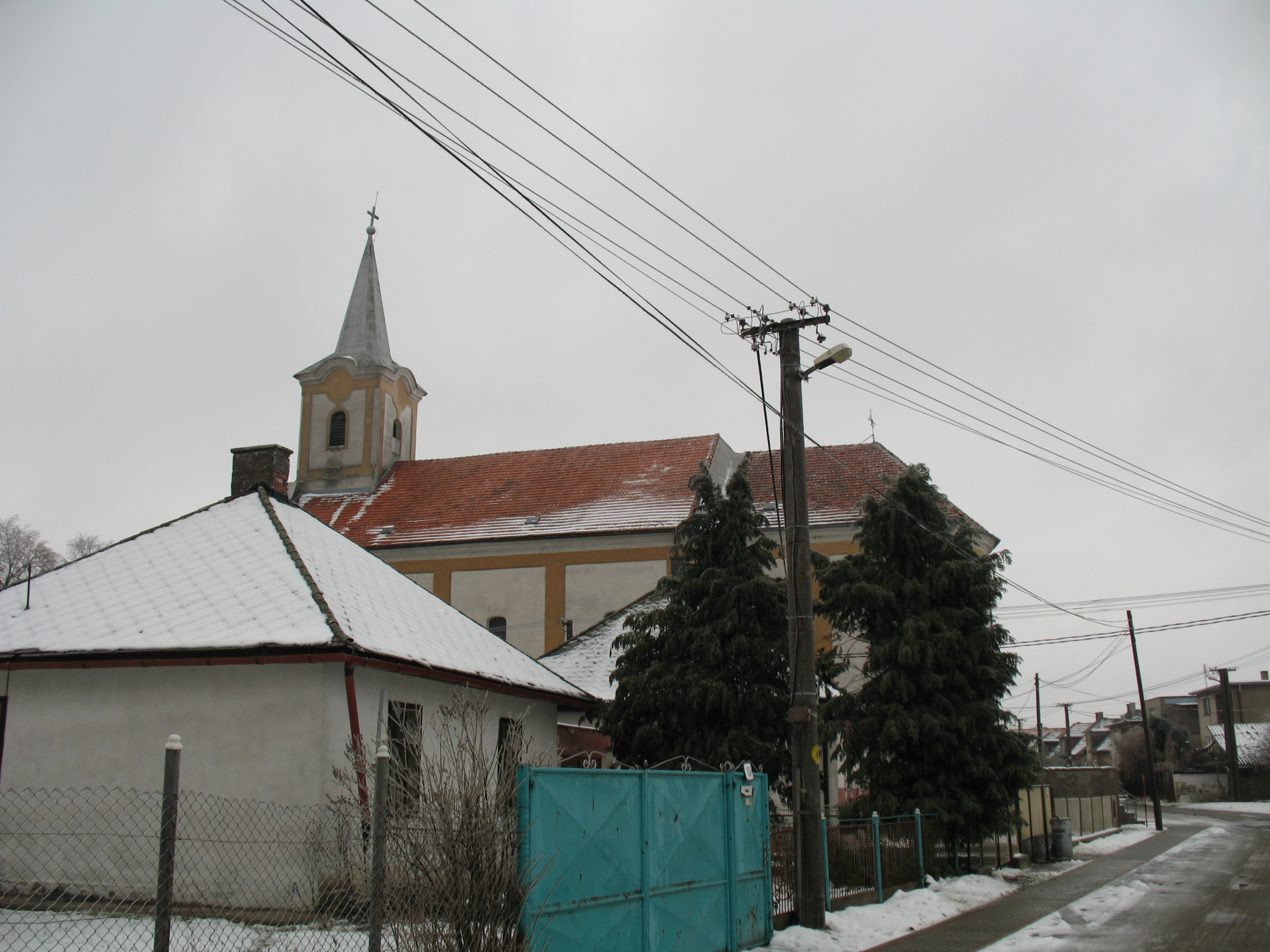

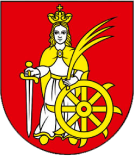
- Flag Coat of arms

- Location of Hrkovce in the Nitra Region Location of Hrkovce in Slovakia
- Coordinates: 48.08°N 18.92°E
- Country: Slovakia
- Region: Nitra Region
- District: Levice District
- First mentioned: 1156

Area
  - Total: 0.00 km^{2} (0 sq mi)
- Elevation: 126 m (413 ft)

Population (2025)
  - Total: 271
- Time zone: UTC+1 (CET)
  - Summer (DST): UTC+2 (CEST)
- Postal code: 936 01
- Area code: +421 36
- Vehicle registration plate (until 2022): LV
- Website: www.hrkovce.sk

Hrkovce (Hungarian: Gyerk) is a village and municipality in the Levice District in the Nitra Region of Slovakia. Following the 2022 elections, the mayor is Róbert Magyar, an independent candidate.

== History ==
The village was first mentioned in historical records in 1156.

== Geography ==
The municipality lies at an altitude of 126 metres (413 ft) and covers an area of 0.00 km^{2} (0 sq mi) (2025).

== Population ==
Population statistic (10 years)
Year	1995	2005	2015	2025
Count	0	313	273	271
Difference		–	−12.77%	−0.73%

Population statistic
Year	2024	2025
Count	280	271
Difference		−3.21%

It has a population of 271 people (31 December 2025).

=== Ethnicity ===
Census 2021 (1+ %)
Ethnicity	Number	Fraction
Slovak	154	52.92%
Hungarian	146	50.17%
Not found out	8	2.74%
Czech	3	1.03%
Total	291	

In year 2021 was 291 people by ethnicity 154 as Slovak, 146 as Hungarian, 8 as Not found out, 3 as Czech and 1 as English.

Note on population: The difference values of population numbers in the table "Population statistic" and in the sections "Ethnicity" & "Religion" is caused by the use of various statistical methods.

=== Religion ===
Census 2021 (1+ %)
Religion	Number	Fraction
Roman Catholic Church	216	74.23%
None	52	17.87%
Evangelical Church	10	3.44%
Greek Catholic Church	6	2.06%
Not found out	3	1.03%
Total	291	

In year 2021 was 291 people by religion 216 from Roman Catholic Church, 52 from None, 10 from Evangelical Church, 6 from Greek Catholic Church, 3 from Not found out, 1 from Calvinist Church, 1 from Other and not ascertained christian church, 1 from Christian Congregations in Slovakia and 1 from Other.

== Facilities ==
The village has a public library.

== See also ==
- List of municipalities and towns in Slovakia
