= Szécsény =

- Town
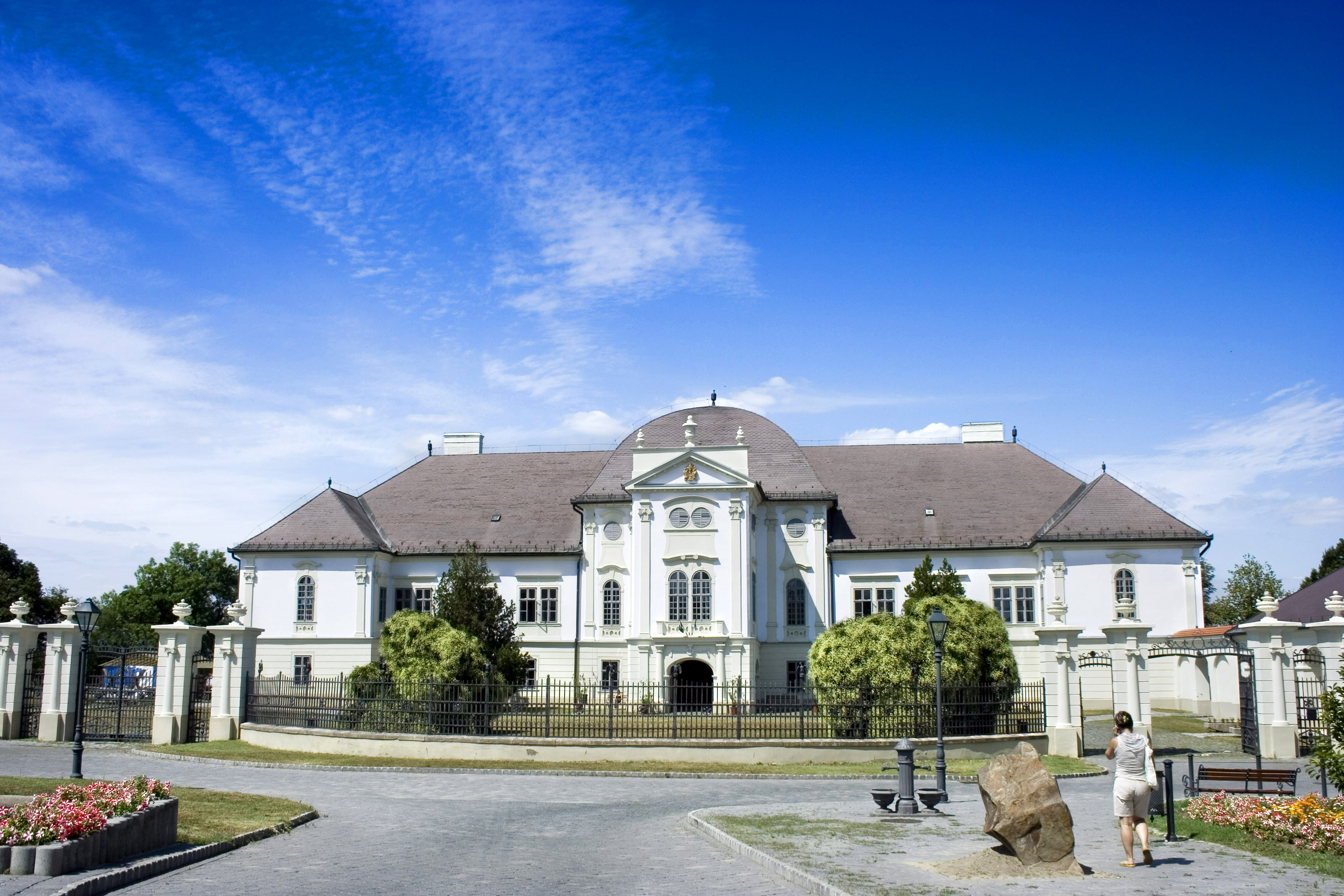
- Kubinyi Ferenc Múzeum

- Flag Coat of arms

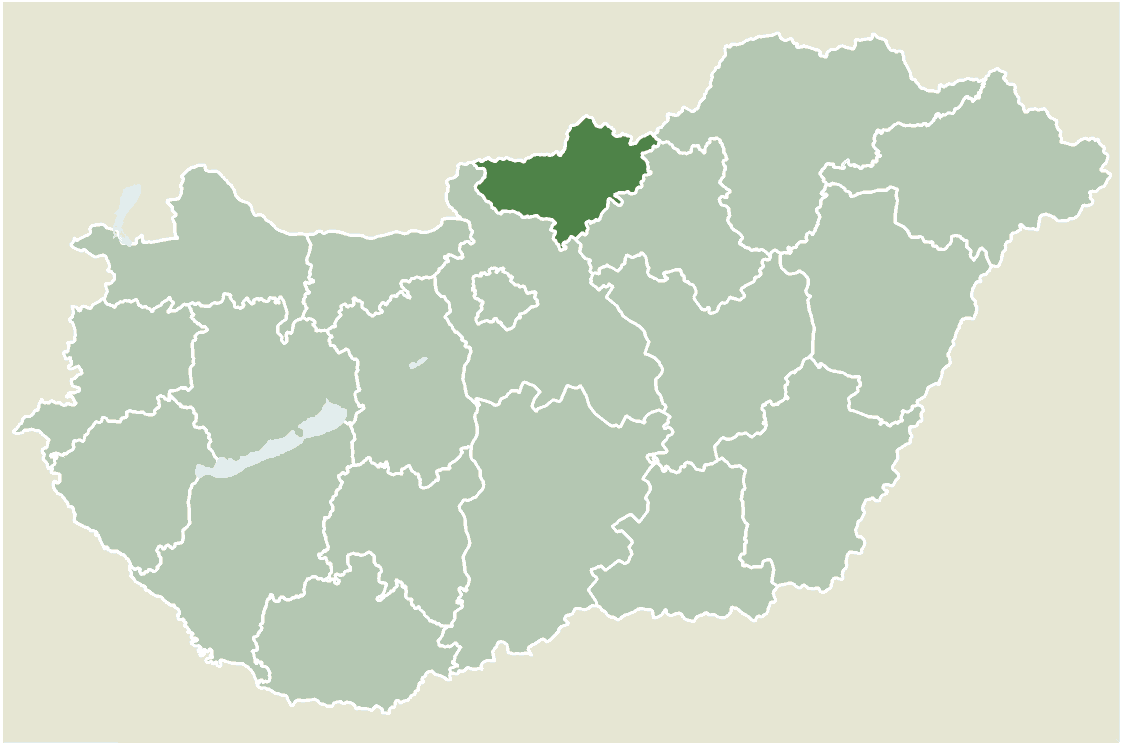
- Location of Nógrád county in Hungary

- Location of Szécsény
- Coordinates: 48.08333°N 19.51667°E
- Country: Hungary
- County: Nógrád
- District: Szécsény

Area
  - Total: 45.83 km^{2} (17.70 sq mi)

Population (2015)
  - Total: 5,937
  - Density: 129.5/km^{2} (335.5/sq mi)
- Time zone: UTC+1 (CET)
  - Summer (DST): UTC+2 (CEST)
- Postal code: 3170
- Area code: (+36) 32
- Website: szecseny.hu

Szécsény (Hungarian pronunciation: [ˈseːt͡ʃeːɲ]) is a town in Nógrád county, Hungary.

== Etymology ==
The name comes from the Slavic sečь: cutting (Sečany). 1219/1550 Scecen.

== History ==
The valley of the Ipoly and especially the area around Szécsény was inhabited even in the prehistoric age. Findings attest that the region was populated from the Neolithic period. Teutons, Avars, and Slavs appeared here in the first millennium BC.

Hungarians settled down in the surrounding country in the decades following the Hungarian Conquest, which began in AD 895. The town itself must have originated from that era. The burial places found on the confines of the town render this pretension probable.

The first genuine written document about Szécsény dates back to 1219. In 1334, Lord Chief Justice Thomas Szécsényi induced King Charles Robert to permit the status of town, so Szécsény became a market town in the same year.

The Turkish occupied Szécsény in 1552 under the name "Seçen" and after that the town became the center of a sanjak for several decades. The first Turkish occupation ended in 1593, whereupon Zsigmond Forgách became the landed proprietor of the town and the captain of the fortress at the same time. The second Turkish occupation lasted 20 years. Szécsény became practically deserted by the end of the nearly 150-year Turkish rule.

One of the most glorious parts of the town history is linked with the war of independence in 1703 against Habsburgs by Prince Ferenc Rákóczi II. The Prince convened the Diet in the town in September 1705, where he was elected the ruling Prince of Transylvania and commander-in chief of the Hungarian insurgent forces. Although the war of independence failed, the inhabitants of the town still treasure the Prince's memory. Many town institutions bear his name.

1737 is a remarkable date in the life of the town as the Forgách repurchased their property from Koháry family. The town began a slow development in the 18th century, a lot of private houses were built and the first pharmacy of the county was opened in 1741. The baroque style Forgách Castle - which is a museum nowadays - was built in that century as well.

The development of the town slowed down in the 19th century and fell behind other towns in Nógrád, such as Balassagyarmat, Losonc, Salgótarján. Szécsény lost its town status in 1886 owing to the decision of Parliament. In spite of the situation, a town hall was built in 1905 and the municipality organized a brilliant commemorative Rákóczi festival on the 200th anniversary of the 1705 Diet.

After the Treaty of Trianon in 1920, following the First World War, Szécsény became a frontier town, which has hindered its development until the present day. The Second World War did not keep out of Szécsény's way either. During the fighting raging in December 1944, the inhabitants suffered greatly.

After the conclusion of the war, the reorganization of life started immediately. Nationalization and collectivization brought fundamental changes in everyday life.

Until the end of the 1970s, Szécsény was an administrative center, being the chief town of the district. When the public administration system was reformed, the function of the seat of the district became extinct. As a result, several institutions and offices were closed down, e.g. the district court, the title registry, the central police station, and the high school. Two other settlements belong to Szécsény's current administration, though: Pösténypuszta, located beside the River Ipoly, and Benczúrfalva, 4 kilometres (2 miles) away.

The recession in the 1990s also damaged the local economy, but significant improvements in infrastructure were carried out, including sewer and gas networks and connection to the national telephone network.

The institutions of the town also have changed. A second high school was founded in 1994, along with an ambulance station and nursing home. The agricultural vocational school and the art school, though, were transferred to the county seat.

== Geography and geology ==
Szécsény lies in the northern part of Nógrád county on the Slovak border, at the edge of the Ipoly valley. The town is situated at a height of 155 metres (509 feet) above sea level in a small basin along the River Ipoly at the intersection of Northern, Northeast, and Eastern Cserhát hills. The major part of the town was built on a plateau extending along the southern edge of the basin. The north–south flow of the river turns into east–west nearby.

Its geographical position is 48° 5" N, 19° 32" E.

The Szentlélek ("Holy Spirit") is a stream running through the town along the edge of the plateau and flowing into the Ipoly. On the confines of the settlement, there is a pond originating from ballast-digging.

== Climatic features ==
Szécsény has a continental climate of wetter type. The average number of sunny hours is 1,990 a year. The average annual mean is 9.1 °C (48.4 °F), on the basis of the yearly average in the last 70 years. The annual rainfall is 360 to 610 mm (14 to 24 in) - taking the yearly average of 50 years as a basis. The prevailing winds are westerly and northwesterly. In Szécsény, the all-time record in the range of daily temperatures in Hungary of 31.1 °C was recorded on March 23, 2022, with a minimum temperature of -7.5 °C and a maximum temperature of 23.6 °C.

Climate data for Szécsény, 1991−2020 normals
Month	Jan	Feb	Mar	Apr	May	Jun	Jul	Aug	Sep	Oct	Nov	Dec	Year
Record high °C (°F)	14.3 (57.7)	17.7 (63.9)	24.7 (76.5)	30.8 (87.4)	32.9 (91.2)	35.6 (96.1)	38.5 (101.3)	37.4 (99.3)	33.9 (93.0)	27.5 (81.5)	22.0 (71.6)	13.7 (56.7)	38.5 (101.3)
Mean daily maximum °C (°F)	1.8 (35.2)	5.1 (41.2)	11.0 (51.8)	17.8 (64.0)	22.3 (72.1)	25.8 (78.4)	27.8 (82.0)	27.5 (81.5)	22.2 (72.0)	15.9 (60.6)	8.7 (47.7)	2.4 (36.3)	15.7 (60.3)
Daily mean °C (°F)	−1.9 (28.6)	0.1 (32.2)	4.7 (40.5)	10.4 (50.7)	14.9 (58.8)	18.8 (65.8)	20.3 (68.5)	19.7 (67.5)	14.9 (58.8)	9.5 (49.1)	4.4 (39.9)	−0.8 (30.6)	9.6 (49.3)
Mean daily minimum °C (°F)	−5.2 (22.6)	−4.3 (24.3)	−1.0 (30.2)	3.3 (37.9)	8.6 (47.5)	12.0 (53.6)	13.3 (55.9)	12.9 (55.2)	8.8 (47.8)	4.5 (40.1)	1.0 (33.8)	−3.6 (25.5)	4.2 (39.6)
Record low °C (°F)	−27.0 (−16.6)	−23.8 (−10.8)	−16.9 (1.6)	−11.0 (12.2)	−3.6 (25.5)	2.6 (36.7)	3.5 (38.3)	2.1 (35.8)	−2.6 (27.3)	−12.5 (9.5)	−14.3 (6.3)	−27.1 (−16.8)	−27.1 (−16.8)
Average precipitation mm (inches)	27.2 (1.07)	29.3 (1.15)	30.7 (1.21)	32.7 (1.29)	63.3 (2.49)	66.9 (2.63)	74.1 (2.92)	62.9 (2.48)	46.8 (1.84)	42.5 (1.67)	42.3 (1.67)	33.3 (1.31)	552.0 (21.73)
Average precipitation days (≥ 1.0 mm)	6.2	5.8	5.7	5.9	8.8	8.1	8.1	6.4	6.2	6.5	7.4	6.5	81.6
Average relative humidity (%)	87.5	81.6	73.1	67.0	71.0	73.1	73.3	72.8	77.4	82.6	87.5	89.9	78.1
Source: NOAA

== Geological features ==
The plough-lands in the Ipoly valley are of good quality, they are suitable for agricultural production. The soil of hills surrounding the valley is of poorer quality but the plateau is under crop. The major part of the soil is medium or high acidic. The most frequent type is brown alluvial forest soil. Quite a large area is covered by 'kovárvány' brown forest soil (sandy brown forest soil with thin interstratified layers of colloid and sesquioxide accumulation), chernozem-brown forest soil and brown earth. Meadow and meadow alluvial soils are typical along the Ipoly. Sporadically, loess and sand can be found. The average gold crown value of the cropland (measurement unit of the quality of arable land in Hungary) is 24.97 per hectare, which is below the national average.

- Infrastructure

After the transformation of regime the town assigned a substantial sum for extension the public utility services to 100%. Every property of the settlement has accessibility to piped water and sewage network as well as to pipeline gas. Szécsény is the traffic junction of the neighbouring villages. Varsány, Nógrádsipek, Rimóc can be approached just via our town. Szécsény lies 30 km (19 mi) from the county seat Salgótarján and 105 km (65 mi) from Budapest. Several bus services are available to Budapest every day but there is a railway line too. Because of the investments of the past years, the roads maintained by the local government got damaged. The municipal corporation is planning to carry out a road reconstruction and intends to finance it steadily.

On the basis of treaty between Hungarian and Slovak Government, in Postenypuszta, which belongs to Szecseny, the building of a bridge on river Ipoly will begin soon. Thus, the bordercross traffic, which has not worked since the World War II, will be reestablished.

== Culture ==
The community centre co-ordinates and organises the cultural life of the town. We have several traditional festivals: Town Day at the end of May or at the beginning of June, Autumn Art Exhibition of Szécsény and Szécsény Vintage Festival. The cultural centre sponsors the Ferenc Erkel mixed-voice choir that has been performing for 30 years. There is a projection in the building once a week. The kindergarteners and school children regularly watch different educational and entertaining films there. The town library works within the framework of the cultural centre. Readers can choose from 44 thousand volumes. The number of the registered readers is nearly 2,000.

== Education, school system ==
The local government maintains the following educational institutions: - Kindergarten: The teachers do high quality pedagogic work in the three buildings of the nursery school. - Ferenc Rákóczi II Elementary School: It has one building. Owing to the high-standard didactic and educational work, pupils won several inter-school competitions. - Sándor Kırösi Csoma Secondary Grammar and Vocational School: The municipal corporation founded it in 1994 as an 8-grade secondary grammar school. The vocational education of computer technology began in 1998. Teaching foreign languages and computer science have -outstanding - importance. The following institutions are maintained by the county self-government: - The School of Arts: The music section is fairly successful. The members of the dramatic group regularly perform at the town festivities. - Béla Lipthay Agricultural Secondary Vocational School: This technical school trains agricultural skilled workers. The students come not only from Nógrád but also from other counties as well. The school also organises courses for adults and courses adjusted to the trade, too. Social welfare, healthcare, unemployment Three general practitioners and two paediatricians work in Szécsény as entrepreneurs. There are four dentists. The dentists also attend the inhabitants of 12 villages in the region of Szécsény. Besides basic healthcare a small laboratory, physical therapy and therapeutic gymnastics are available as well. There is a gynaecological consultation too but it is a private practice. More and more people appeal to holistic medicine practitioners whose work is co-ordinated by one of the paediatricians in the framework of a medical centre. The ambulance station has been working since 1993. Its job is confined to transporting patients. The emergency service is operated by an enterprise owned by a doctor.

- Social welfare

The present data of the unemployment show that approximately 1,000 inhabitants are entitled to a form of social allocations the major part of which is financed by the local authority.

- Unemployment

Our figures, which were published by the Employment Centre of Nógrád County, relate to Szécsény and its region. The number of the registered unemployed: 1,625, including 896 men and 729 women. Manual workers: 1,429 people, not manual, white-collar workers: 196 people. Professional grouping: - Skilled worker: 425 - Semi-skilled labourer: 507 - Unskilled worker or handyman: 520 Classification according to educational level: - fewer than 8 elementary grades: 245 - 8-grade elementary school: 688 - trade school: 392 - technical school: 24 - technical academy: 40 - vocational technical school: 130 - secondary grammar school: 86 - college, university: 20

- Agriculture

As a consequence of the Act of Co-operative farms 1992, one of the best co-operative farms of the country was liquidated in Szécsény and was succeeded by a number of collective and private farms. They work in the agricultural sector and deal with cultivation first of all. The traditionally grown plants are: potato, maize, sunflower and grain crop.

The collective farms are raising cows at present as well as sheep. Growing number of private farmers keep horses too. The majority of the landowners have a farm of 1.5 hectares (3.7 acres). This area supplies their household mainly. There are few private or collective farmers who run a farm bigger than 50 hectares.

- Industry

The biggest employer of the town is Eurocandle Ltd., the owners of which are Danish entrepreneurs. They employ 300 people and export their products. The other important industrial company, the Tommy Invest Ltd. gives work to 280 workers. Several building entrepreneurs work in the town. There are two important factories: furniture and packing machines ones. A lot of trading companies work in our town. The most significant of them is Palóc-Coop Ltd. The local government is revising the tax on practice of a trade, the amount of which is 2,0%.

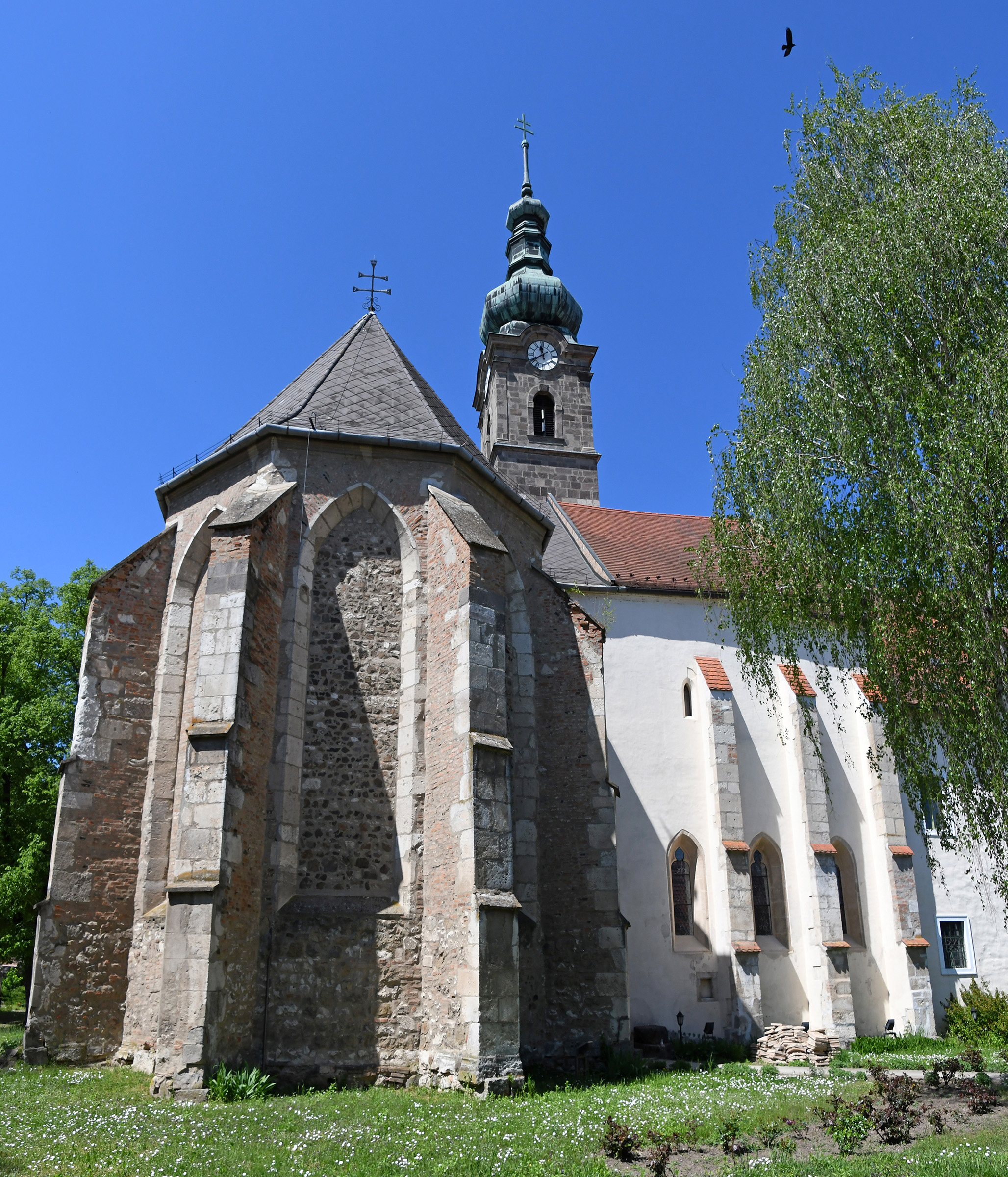
Catholic church

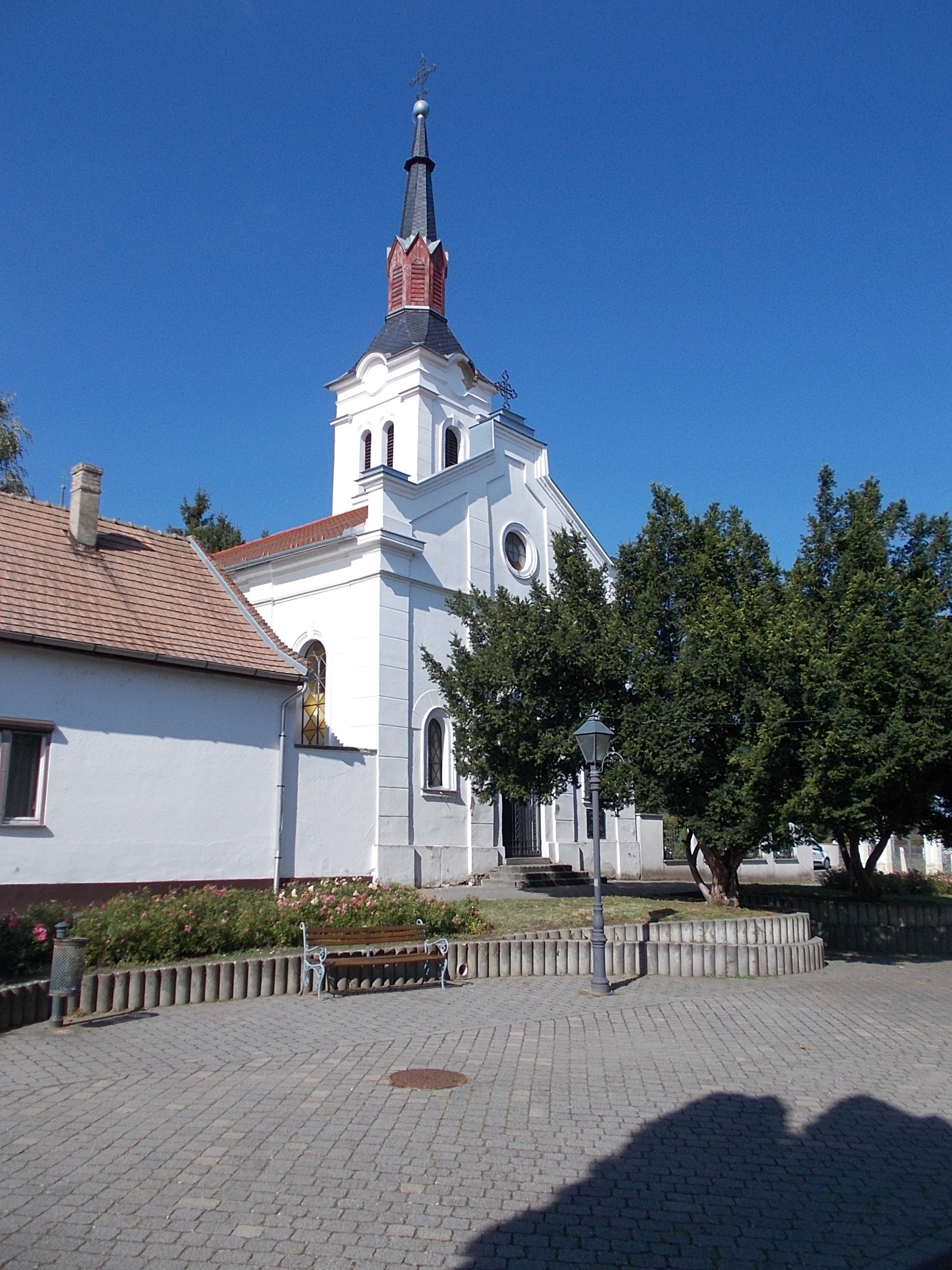
Lutheran church

- Religion

The majority of the inhabitants are Roman Catholic, the minority is Lutheran. The practice of the Catholic religion is helped by Franciscan friars who live in the local Franciscan monastery, founded in 1339. The Clarissa nuns (Franciscan Order of Poor Clares) undertake the task of nursing of great importance.

- Ethnic minorities

The Gypsy Minority Self-government has been working in the town since 1994. Their aim is to preserve and protect the Gypsy traditions. The mayor's office supports their work and supplies the material conditions for them.

- Tourism

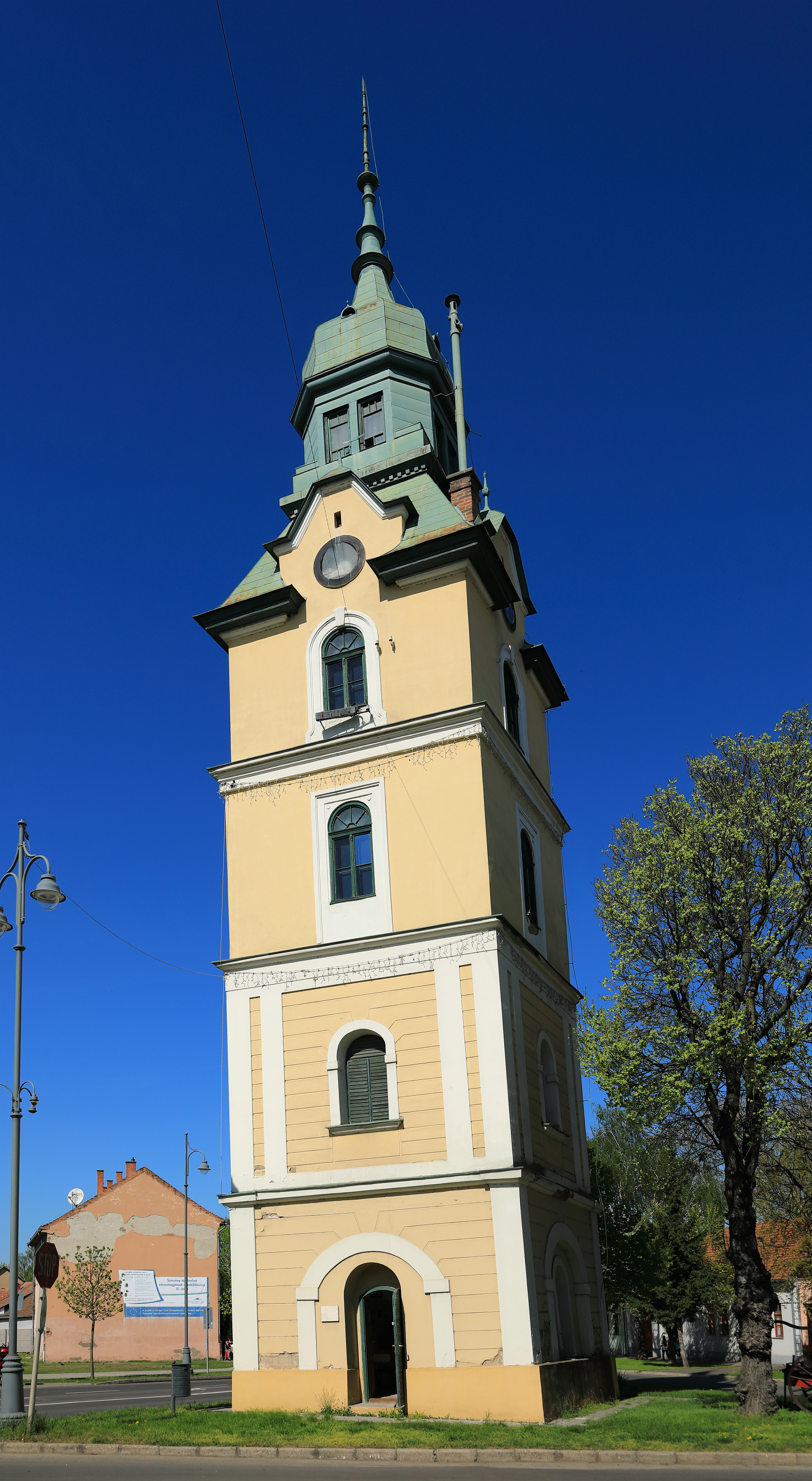
The Firetower, the leaning tower of the town

The local authority maintains a Tourinform office, which works together with the Handicrafts’ Society in the renovated building of Handicraftsman's House and provides visitors with free regional brochure and tourist guidance.

szecseny town's webpage

== Twin towns – sister cities ==
Szécsény is twinned with:

- Fiľakovo, Slovakia
- Kováčovce, Slovakia
- Niepołomice, Poland
- Warta, Poland

== Picture gallery ==
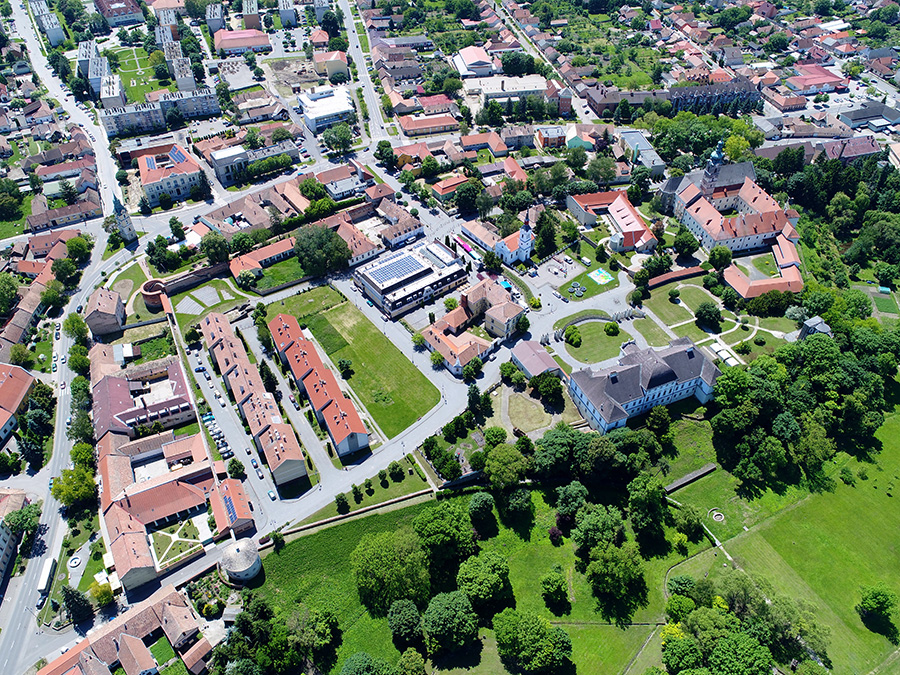
Szécsény Center

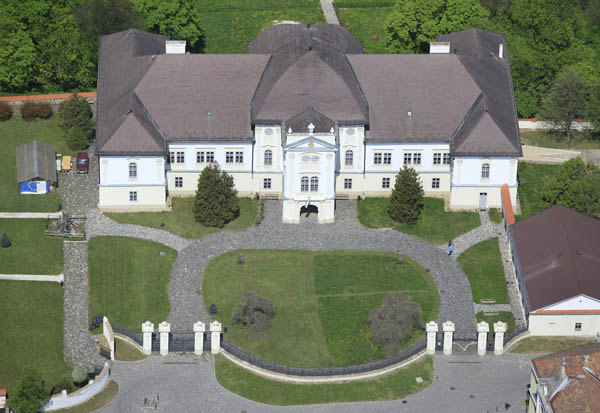
Forgách-castle

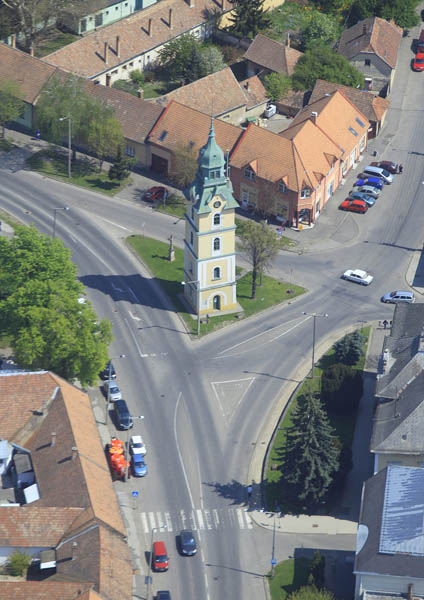
Fire Tower, early 18th century

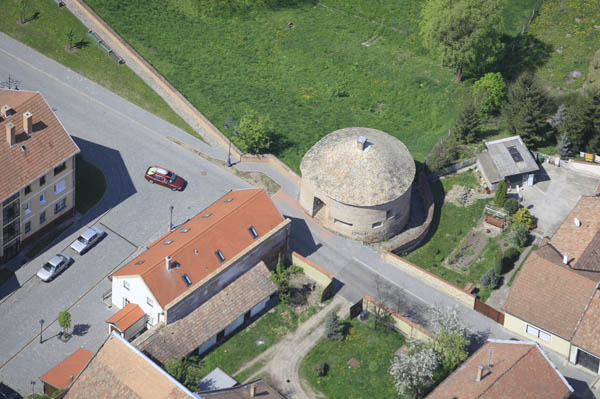
Szécsény bastion

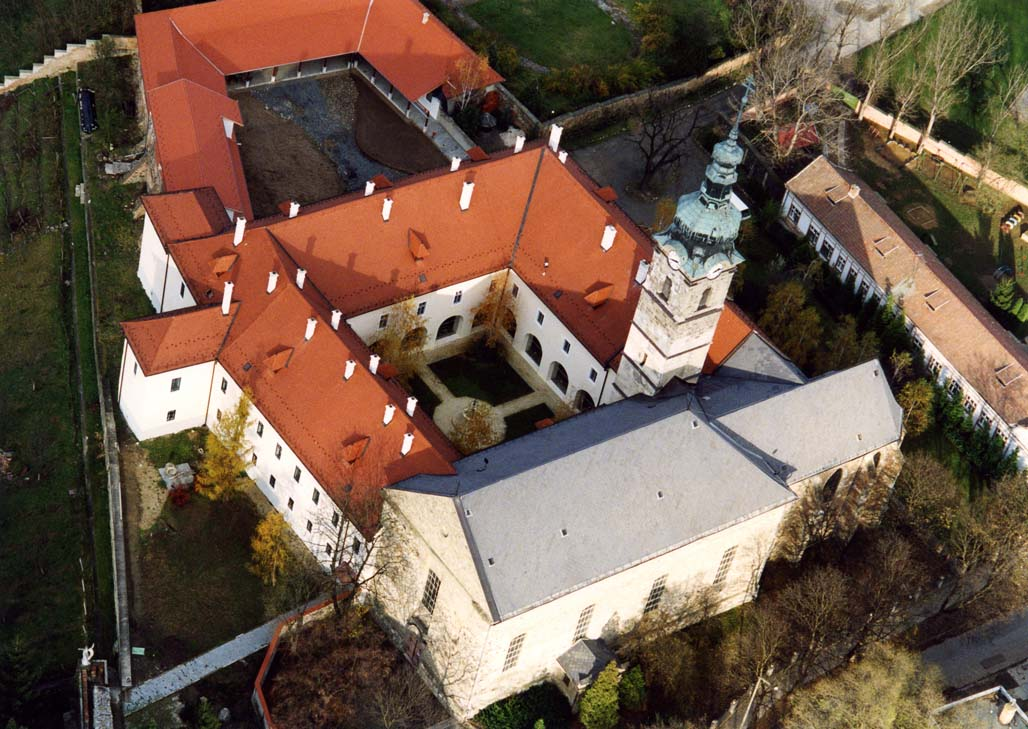
Franciscan Convent
