= Ipolytarnóc =

Ipolytarnóc Ipeľský Trnovec (in Slovak)
- Village
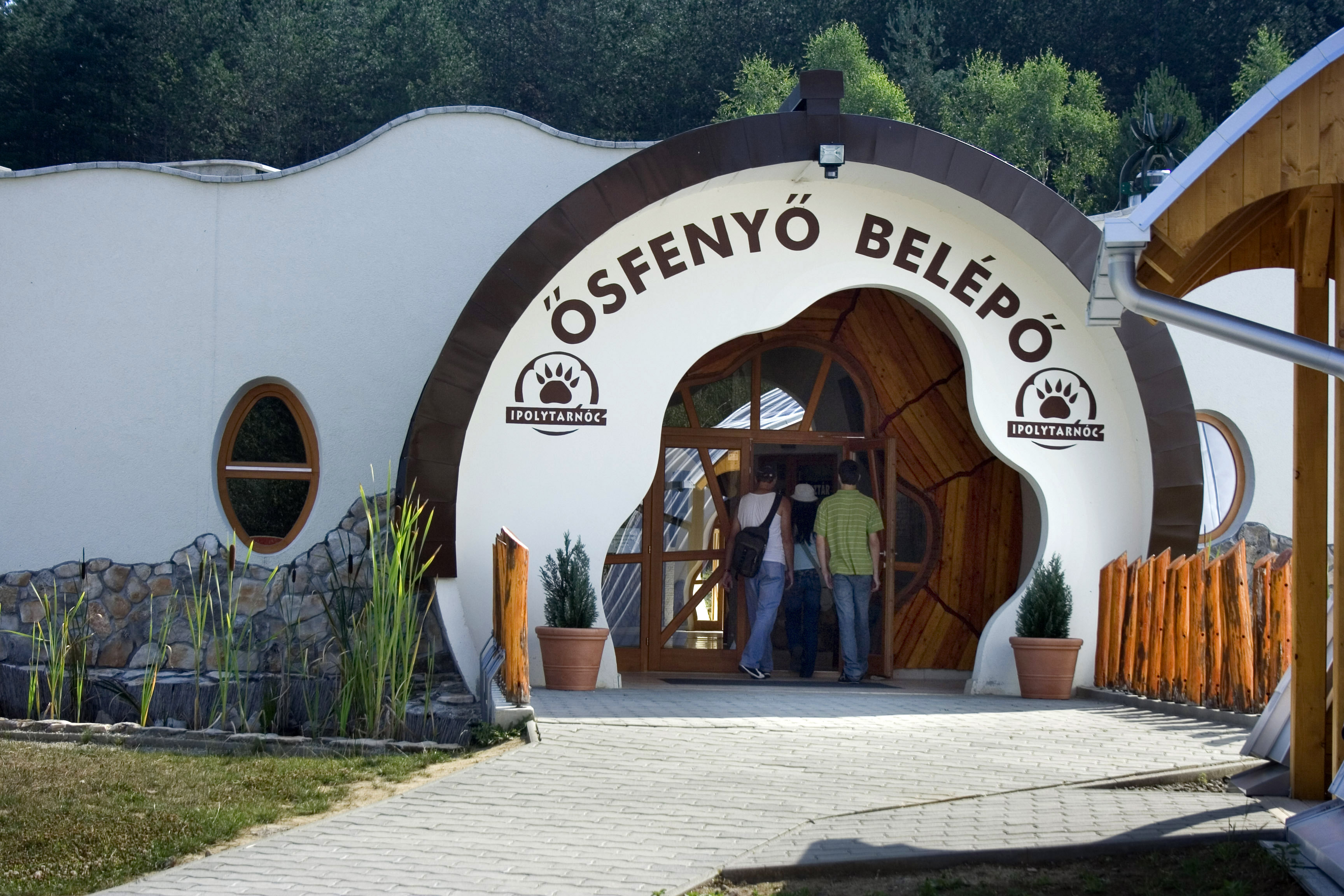
- Ancient Pine Museum in Ipolytarnóc

- Coat of arms

- Location of Ipolytarnóc
- Coordinates: 48.23650°N 19.62635°E
- Country: Hungary
- County: Nógrád

Area
  - Total: 13.66 km^{2} (5.27 sq mi)

Population (2001)
  - Total: 571
  - Density: 41.8/km^{2} (108/sq mi)
- Time zone: UTC+1 (CET)
  - Summer (DST): UTC+2 (CEST)
- Postal code: 3138
- Area code: 32

Ipolytarnóc (Slovak: Ipeľský Trnovec) is a village in Hungary, Nógrád county. There is a fossil site close to it, the Ipolytarnoc Fossils Nature Conservation Area.

== Fossils ==
Sometimes referred to as the "Prehistoric Pompeii", Ipolytarnóc is the location of 23 to 17 million year old fossils. These include the teeth of 24 species of sharks as well as the teeth of crocodiles and dolphins, an almost 100 m tall petrified pine, more than 15,000 subtropical exotic leaves and 3,000 animal footprints of 11 species. This is one of the world's richest complex fossil footprint find sites. The fossils were preserved due to a volcanic catastrophe which buried a whole subtropical jungle under volcanic ash. From 1900 to 2021, a total of 7000 taxa (rhinoceros, artiodactyls, crocodiles, birds, and carnivores) have been identified. In the last 120 years, 3000 vertebrate taxa have been found.

Ipolytarnóc is separated into rhinoland and crocodilia. Rhinoland is the terrestrial land area, named for its abundance of rhinos, rodents, and artiodactyl tracks. Crocodilia is the intertidal pool, that contains preservations of crocodilians, turtles, and lizard tracks.

Recently, the Amphicyonidae or "bear dog", Bestiopeda maxima has been reclassified as Platykopus maxima based on 3D imaging showing it to be a pentadactyl (animal with five digits).Bestiopeda genus applies to tetradactyls (animals with four digits).

The site became protected in 1944 and is managed by the Directorate of the Bükk National Park. The site became the main gateway to the world's second transborder geopark, the Novohrad – Nógrád Geopark, in 2010. The site provides several day-long programmes, including guided tours along its geological study trail and 4D movies about the prehistoric past in its Visitor Centre. The geological trail was opened to the public in 1986. Ongoing excavations have a focus of preservation and rehabilitation, like utilizing 3D imaging of tracks. However, climate change has been posing a threat to the preservation of exposed tracks.
