= Szob =

- Town
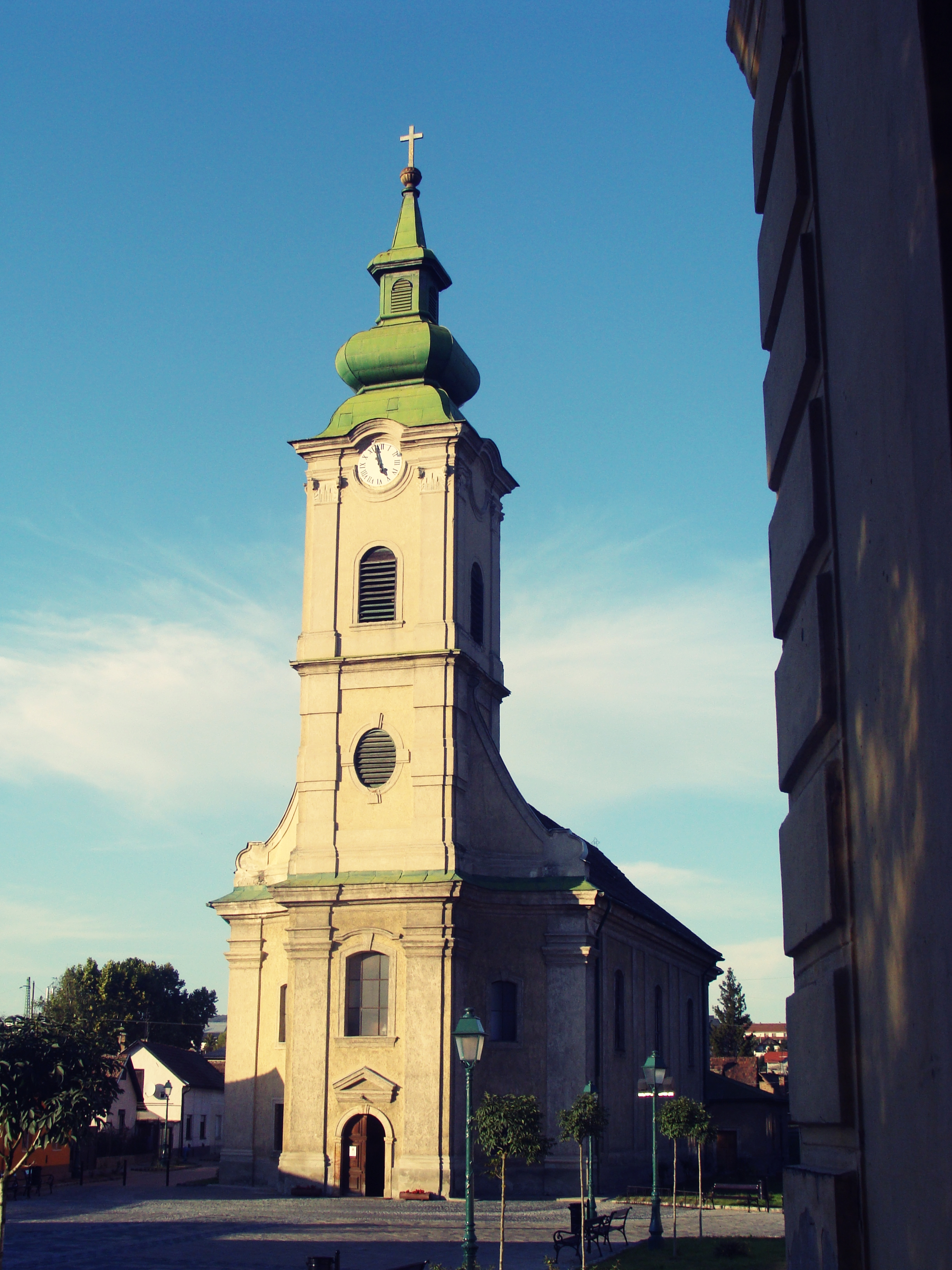
- Roman Catholic Church

- Flag Coat of arms
- Interactive map of Szob
- Location of Szob
- Coordinates: 47.81944°N 18.86930°E
- Country: Hungary
- County: Pest
- District: Szob

Area
  - Total: 20.07 km^{2} (7.75 sq mi)

Population (2015)
  - Total: 2,730
  - Density: 136/km^{2} (352/sq mi)
- Time zone: UTC+1 (CET)
  - Summer (DST): UTC+2 (CEST)
- Postal code: 2628
- Area code: (+36) 27
- Website: www.szob.hu

Szob (German: Zopp an der Donau, Slovak: Soba) is a town in Pest county, Central Hungary, Hungary. It is just south and east of the Slovak border on the north bank of the Danube.

Szob is on a major electrified rail connection from Bratislava and a major railway border crossing into Hungary. The border is located between Szob and Štúrovo. On 21 December 2007, all border controls ceased as Hungary and Slovakia became part of the Schengen Area.

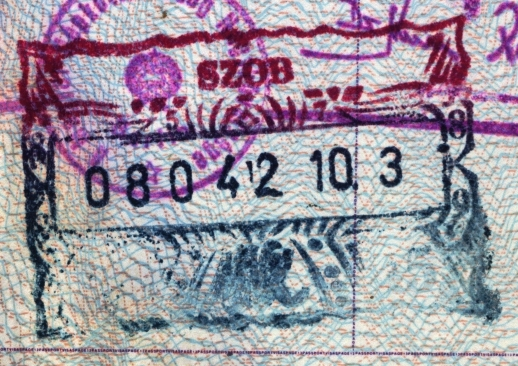
Pre-Schengen passport stamp from Szob.

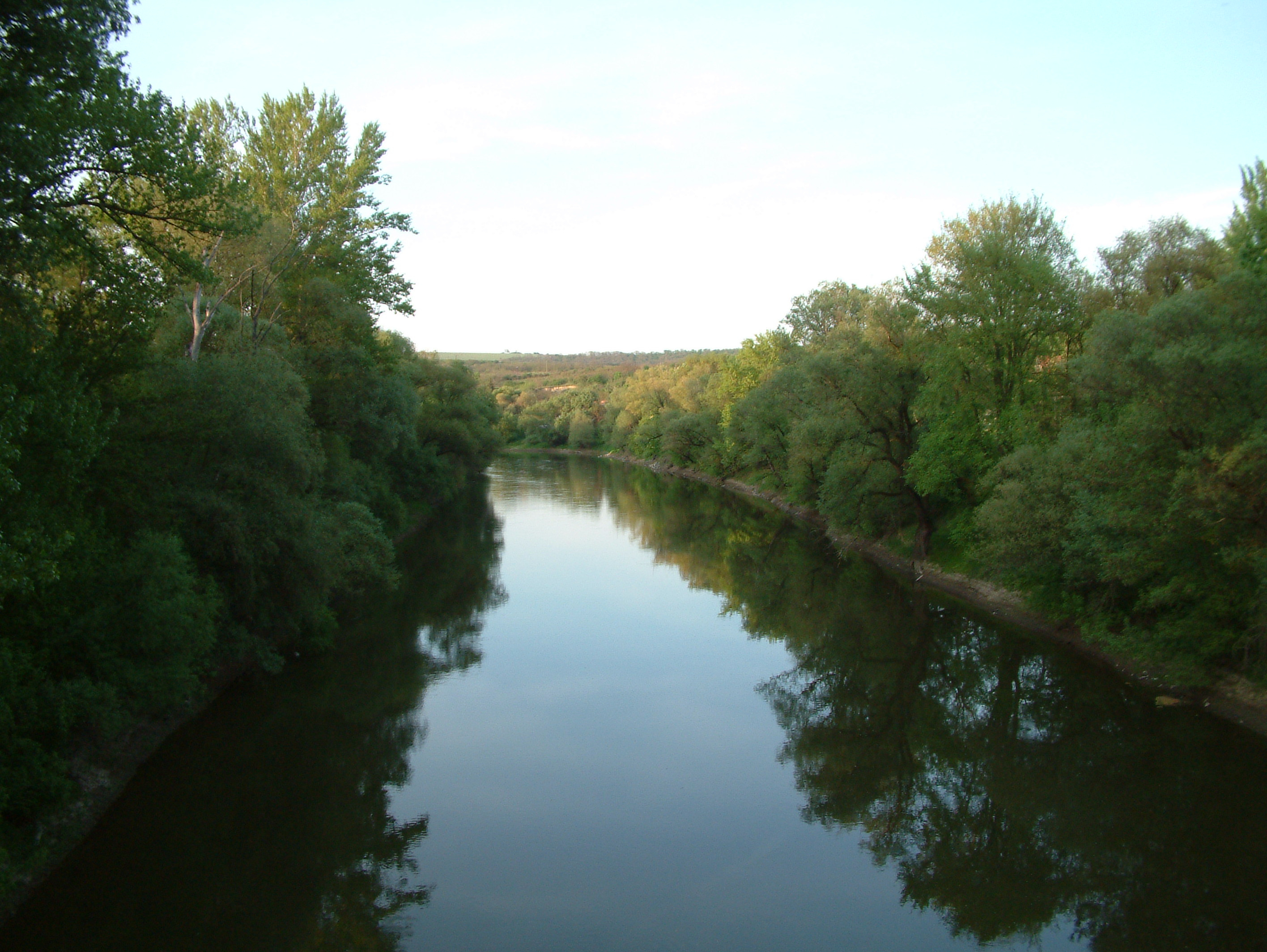
River Ipoly at Szob

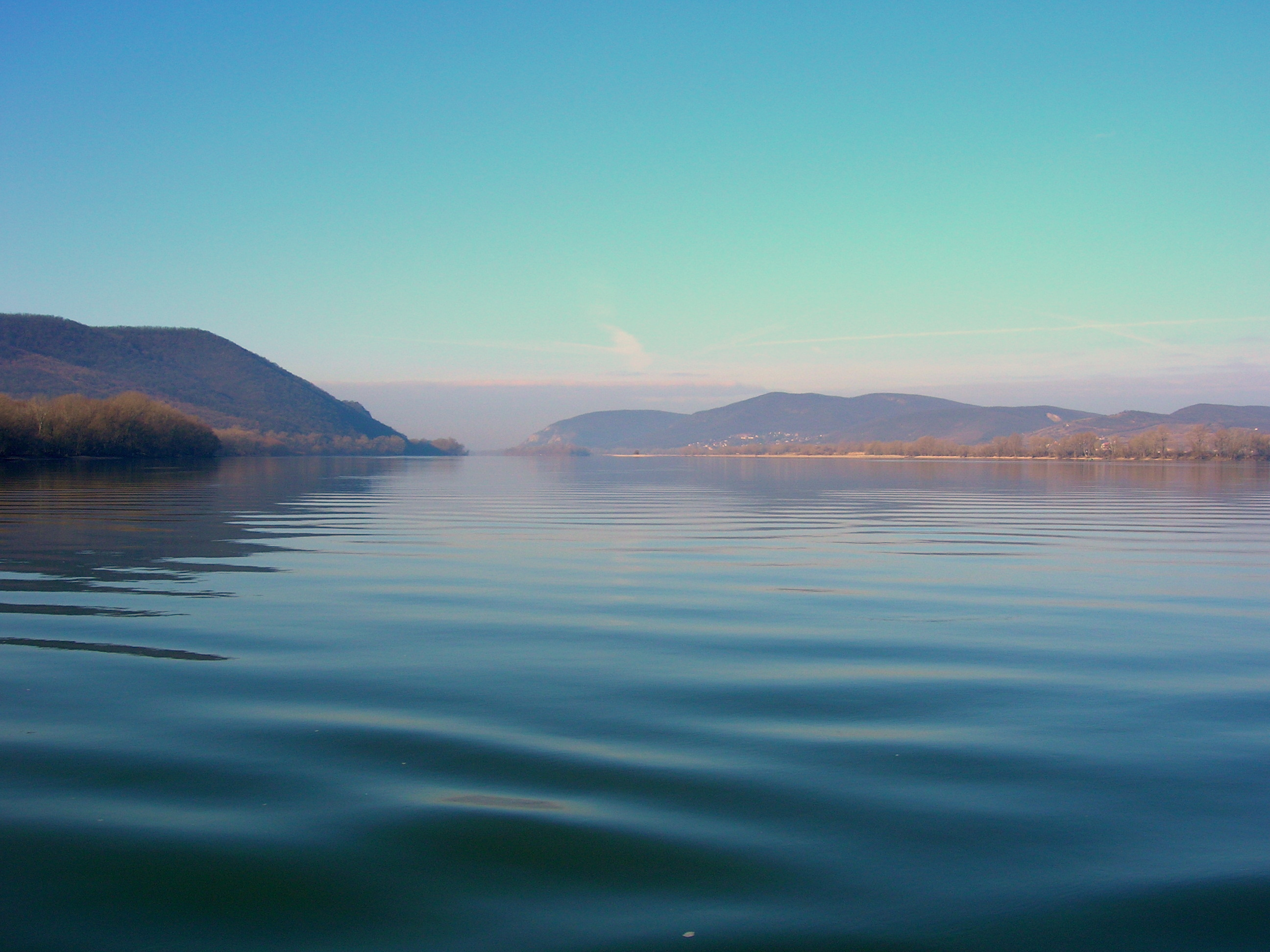
The River Danube at Szob

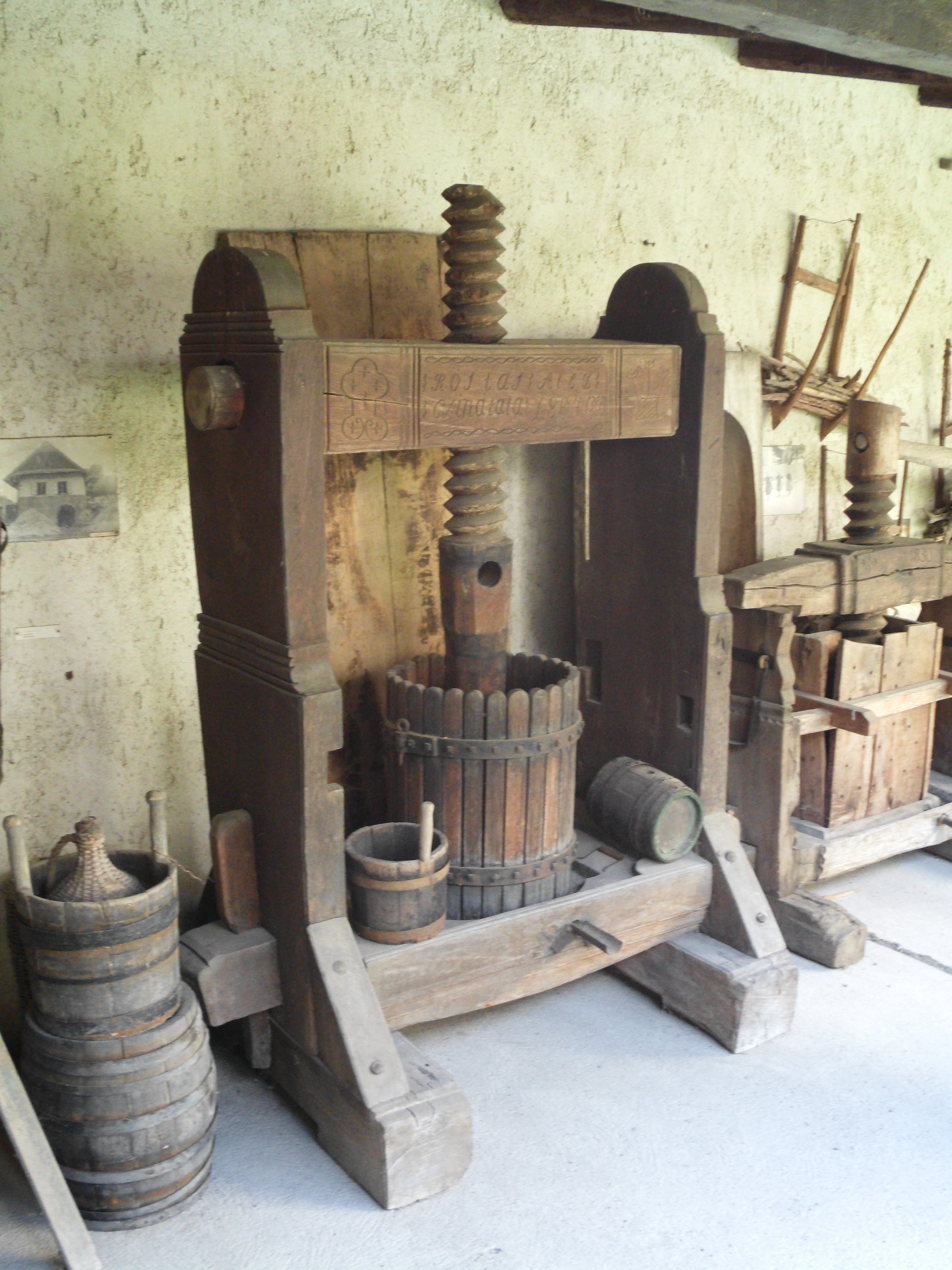
Winepress in the town museum

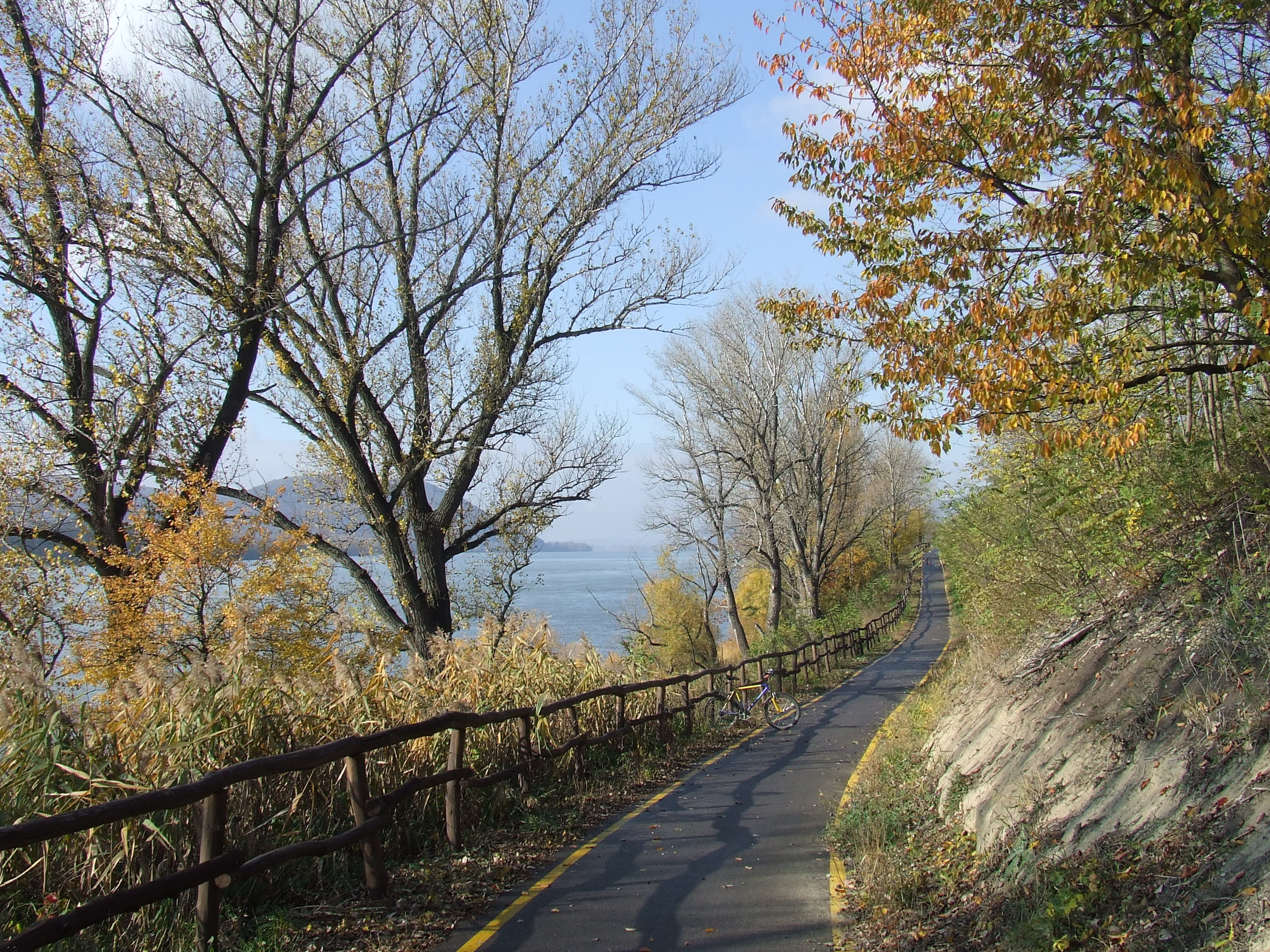
Bicycle path along the River Danube

== List of notable people from Szob ==
- Gábor Demjén (1986 - ), footballer for Abahani Limited.
- László Antal (1930 - 1993), linguist.
- Gudbrand Gregersen de Saág (1824 – 24 December 1910), Norwegian-born Norwegian-Hungarian bridge engineer.
- Gyula Nagy (1924 - 1996 ), footballer
