= Ipeľské Predmostie =

Village and municipality in Slovakia

Ipeľské Predmostie Ipolyhídvég
- Municipality
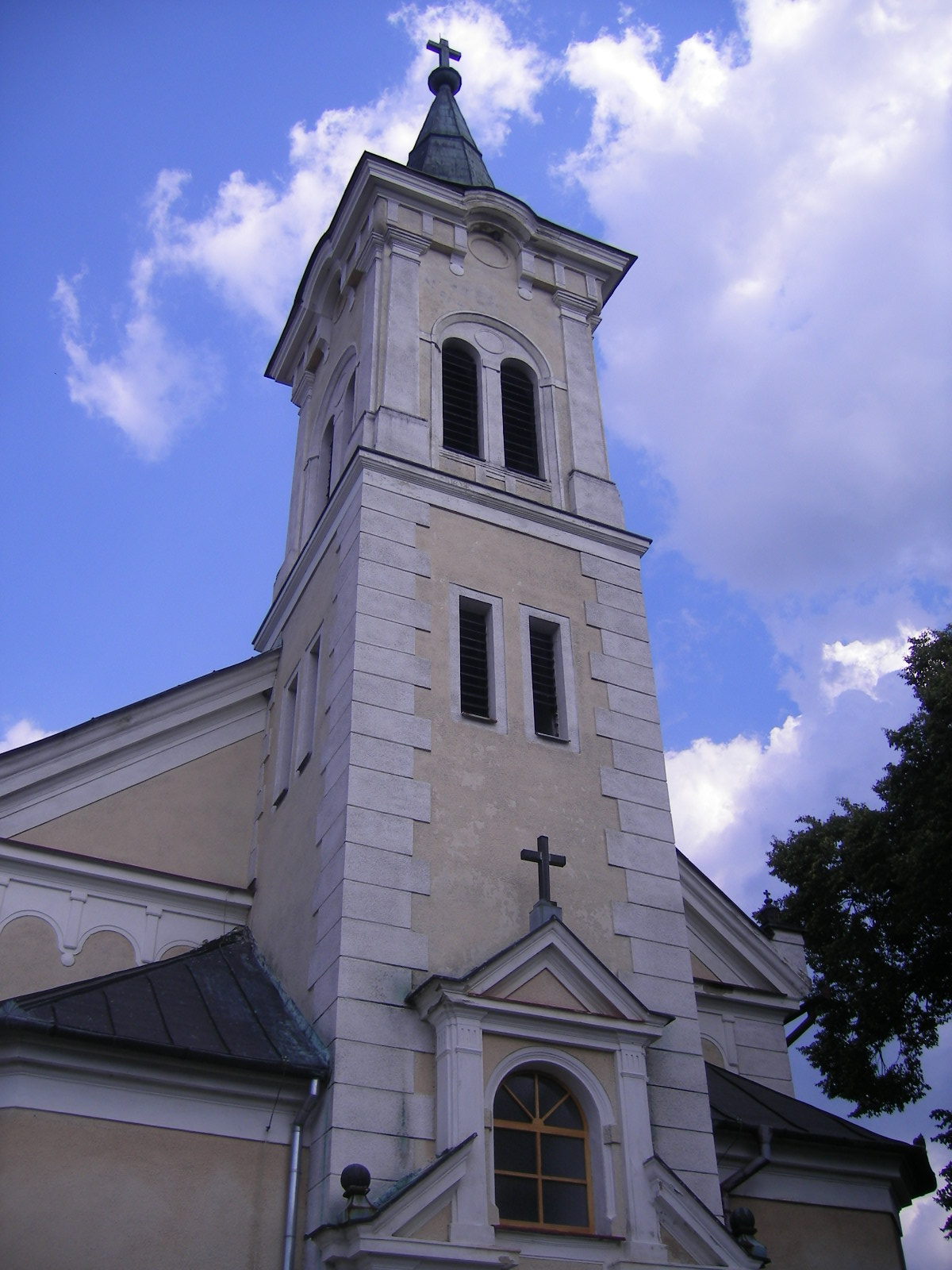

- Flag

- Location of Ipeľské Predmostie in the Banská Bystrica Region Location of Ipeľské Predmostie in Slovakia
- Coordinates: 48.07°N 19.07°E
- Country: Slovakia
- Region: Banská Bystrica Region
- District: Veľký Krtíš District
- First mentioned: 1252

Area
  - Total: 13.83 km^{2} (5.34 sq mi)
- Elevation: 133 m (436 ft)

Population (2025)
  - Total: 539
- Time zone: UTC+1 (CET)
  - Summer (DST): UTC+2 (CEST)
- Postal code: 991 10
- Area code: +421 47
- Vehicle registration plate (until 2022): VK
- Website: www.ipelskepredmostie.sk

Ipeľské Predmostie (Hungarian: Ipolyhídvég) is a village and municipality of the Veľký Krtíš District in the Banská Bystrica Region of southern Slovakia.

== Geography ==
The municipality lies at an altitude of 133 metres (436 ft) and covers an area of 13.83 km^{2} (5.34 sq mi) (2025).

== Population ==
Population statistic (10 years)
Year	1995	2005	2015	2025
Count	685	618	632	539
Difference		−9.78%	+2.26%	−14.71%

Population statistic
Year	2024	2025
Count	547	539
Difference		−1.46%

It has a population of 539 people (31 December 2025).

=== Ethnicity ===
Census 2021 (1+ %)
Ethnicity	Number	Fraction
Hungarian	452	78.2%
Slovak	166	28.71%
Not found out	22	3.8%
Total	578	

In year 2021 was 578 people by ethnicity 452 as Hungarian, 166 as Slovak, 22 as Not found out, 3 as Other, 1 as Jewish, 1 as Czech and 1 as Romanian.

Note on population: The difference values of population numbers in the table "Population statistic" and in the sections "Ethnicity" & "Religion" is caused by the use of various statistical methods.

=== Religion ===
Census 2021 (1+ %)
Religion	Number	Fraction
Roman Catholic Church	507	87.72%
None	37	6.4%
Not found out	15	2.6%
Greek Catholic Church	7	1.21%
Christian Congregations in Slovakia	6	1.04%
Total	578	

In year 2021 was 578 people by religion 507 from Roman Catholic Church, 37 from None, 15 from Not found out, 7 from Greek Catholic Church, 6 from Christian Congregations in Slovakia, 3 from Evangelical Church, 1 from Calvinist Church, 1 from Other and not ascertained christian church and 1 from Buddhism.

== See also ==
- List of municipalities and towns in Slovakia
