= Vámosmikola =

Coordinates: 47°58′35″N 18°47′00″E

- Flag Coat of arms

- Country: Hungary
- Region: Central Hungary
- County: Pest

Vámosmikola is a village and commune in Pest County in Hungary.
