= Czech rail border crossings =

These are all the Czech rail border crossings as of 2007. Crossings in italics are abandoned. The year of opening is in brackets.

== Czech Republic – Austria ==
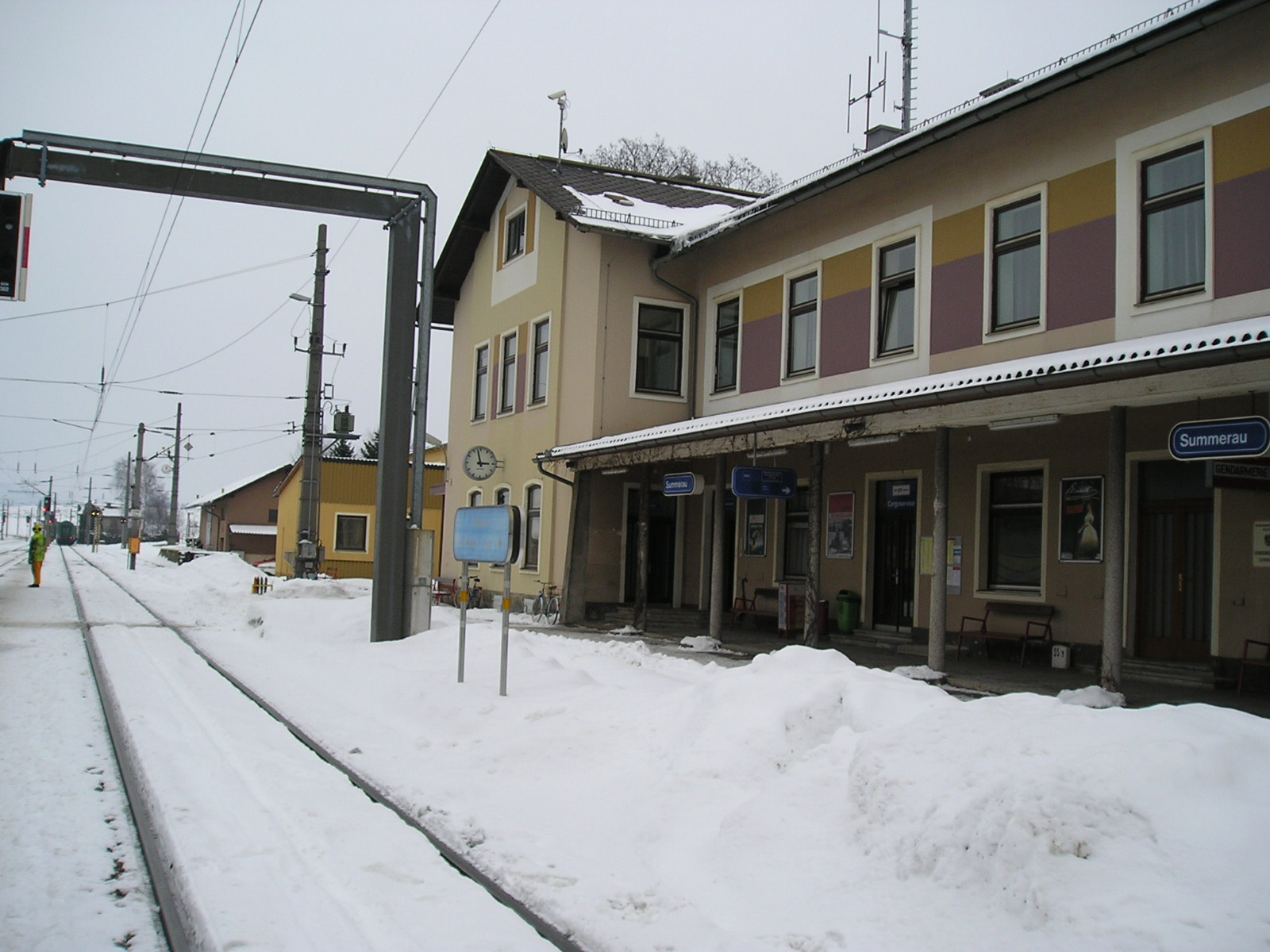
Summerau

Note that all of these railway lines were built in Austria-Hungary and became border crossings after the creation of Czechoslovakia in 1918.

- Břeclav - Bernhardsthal (1839), see North railway
- Novosedly - Laa an der Thaya (1872-1930)
- Hevlín - Laa an der Thaya (1870-1945)
- Znojmo - Retz (1871)
- Slavonice - Fratres (1903-1945)
- České Velenice - Breitensee (1900-1950), narrow gauge
- České Velenice - Gmünd (1869), see Franz Josef Railway
- České Velenice - Gmünd (1902-1950), narrow gauge Waldviertelbahn to Groß Gerungs, remaining bridge across Lužnice leads to a border crossing for pedestrians
- Horní Dvořiště - Summerau (1871)

== Czech Republic – Germany ==
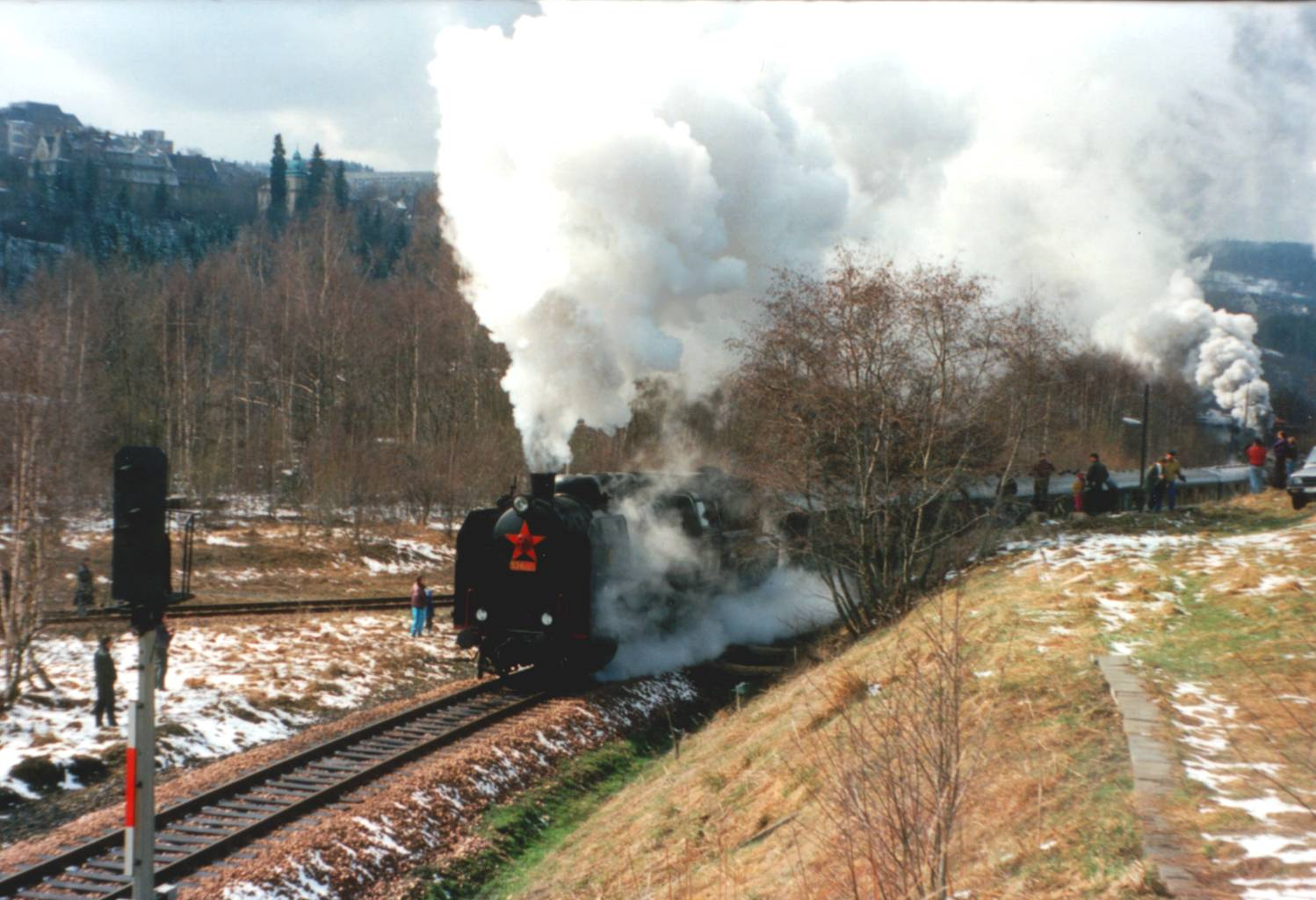
Re-opening of railway border crossing Potůčky-Johanngeorgenstadt in 1992

- Stožec - Haidmühle (1910-1945), currently 105 m long heritage railway only
- Železná Ruda - Bayerisch Eisenstein (1877-1953, 1992), passenger transport only
- Česká Kubice - Furth im Wald (1861)
- Cheb - Waldsassen (1865-1945), currently a biking trail
- Cheb - Schirnding (1883)
- Aš - Selb - Plößberg (1865), reopened for passenger transport in December 2015
- Hranice v Čechách - Adorf (1906-1945)
- Vojtanov - Bad Brambach (1856)
- Kraslice - Klingenthal (1886-1952, 2000), passenger transport only
- Potůčky - Johanngeorgenstadt (1889-1945, 2003)
- Vejprty - Bärenstein (1872-1945, 1993)
- Křimov - Reitzenhain (1875-1947)
- Moldava v Krušných Horách - Holzhau (1884-1945)
- Děčín - Bad Schandau (1851)
- Dolní Poustevna - Sebnitz (1905-1945), reopened in 2014
- Rumburk - Ebersbach (1873)
- Varnsdorf - Seifhennersdorf (1871), passenger transport only
- Varnsdorf - Großschönau (1871), passenger transport only
- Hrádek nad Nisou - Zittau (1859-1945, 1951), currently through Polish territory

== Czech Republic – Poland ==
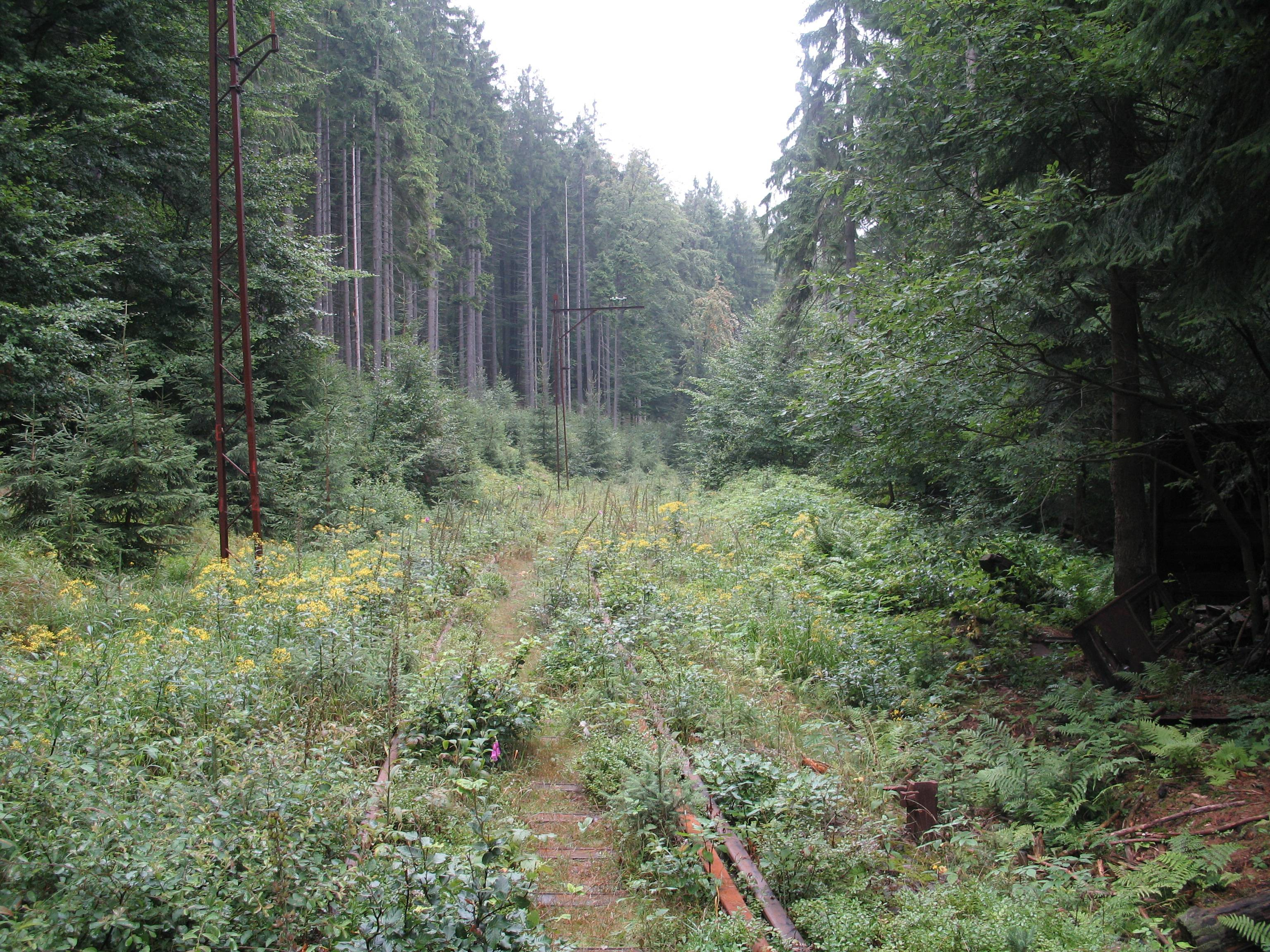
Abandoned track Harrachov-Jakuszyce, now again in operation

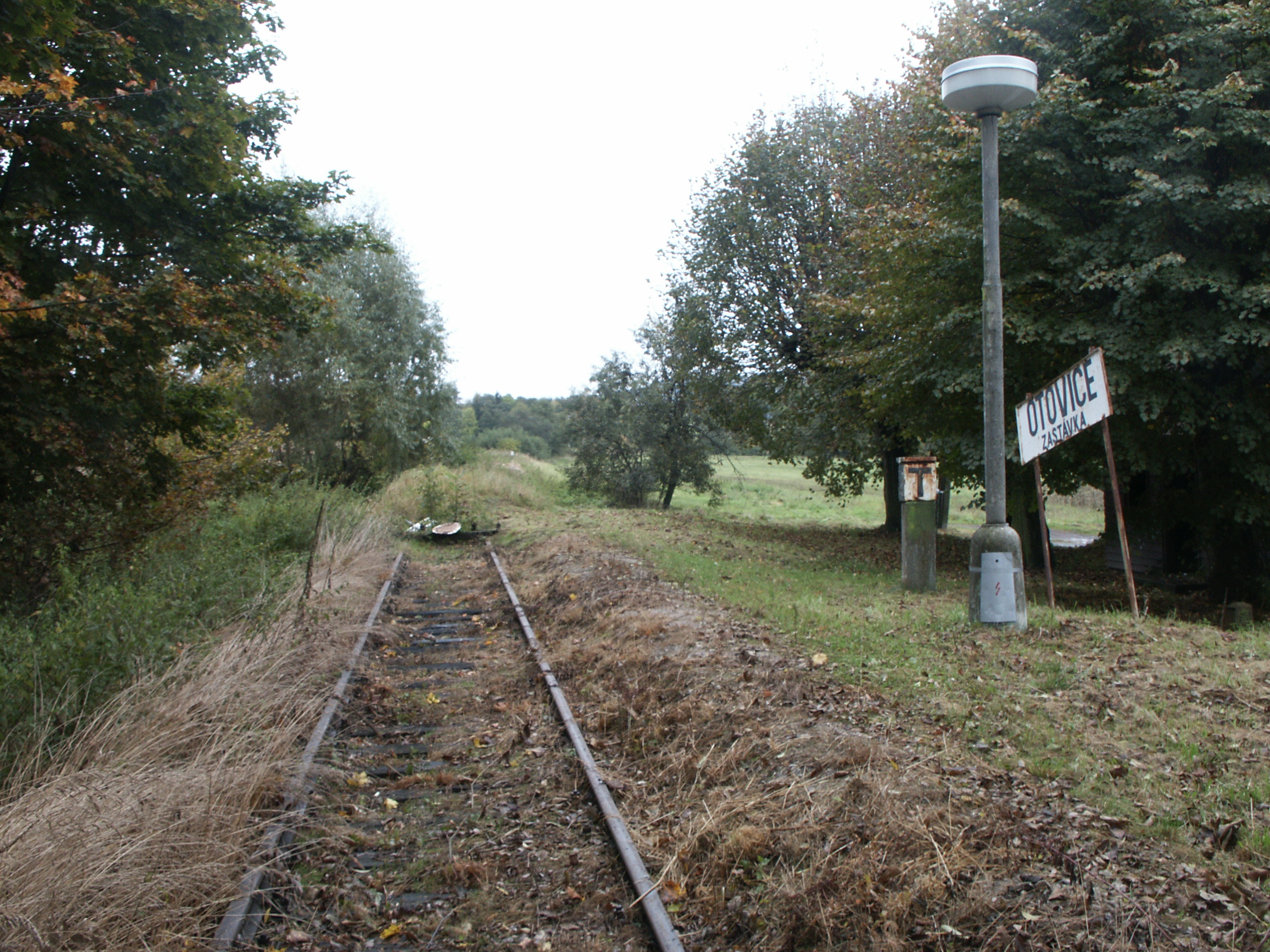
End of track in Otovice (2007)

Note that all these railway lines were built before the re-creation of Poland, so that some of them originally went to Germany, while others were entirely within the Austro-Hungarian empire.

- Heřmanice - Bogatynia (Reichenau) (1900-1945), narrow gauge, see Frýdlant-Heřmanice Railway
- Frýdlant v Čechách - Zawidów (Seidenberg) (1875), transport of goods only
- Jindřichovice pod Smrkem - Mirsk (Friedeberg) (1902-1945)
- Harrachov - Jakuszyce (1902-1945, 2010–present), see Cog railway Tanvald-Harrachov and Izera railway
- Královec - Lubawka (1869), regular traffic
- Meziměstí - Mieroszów (1877)
- Otovice - Tłumaczów (Tuntschendorf) (1889-1945)
- Náchod-Běloves - Kudowa-Zdrój (1945)
- Lichkov - Międzylesie (1875)
- Bernartice - Dziewiętlice (-1945)
- Vidnava - Kałków (1911-1945)
- Mikulovice - Głuchołazy (1888)
- Jindřichov ve Slezsku - Głuchołazy (1875)
- Krnov - Głubczyce (1873-1945)
- Opava - Pilszcz (1909-1945)
- Chuchelná - Krzanowice (1895-1945)
- Bohumín - Chałupki (1848)
- Petrovice u Karviné - Zebrzydowice (1855)
- Albrechtice - Marklowice (1914-1931), abolished after enactment of border with Poland, only base of bridge across Olza remained
- Český Těšín - Cieszyn (1888)

== Czech Republic – Slovakia ==
Note that all of these railway lines were built before the dissolution of Czechoslovakia in 1993 and became border crossings in that year.

- Mosty u Jablunkova - Čadca (1871)
- Horní Lideč - Lúky pod Makytou (1937)
- Vlárský průsmyk - Horné Srnie (1888)
- Velká nad Veličkou - Vrbovce (1929)
- Sudoměřice - Skalica (1893), no regular traffic
- Hodonín - Holíč (1891), currently no regular traffic, used for diversions in case of temporary closures on Lanžhot - Kúty line
- Lanžhot - Kúty (1900)

== Unrealised projects ==
- Nová Bystřice - Litschau (gauge 760 mm)
- Moldava - Hermsdorf-Rehefeld, narrow gauge Pöbel Railway to Schmiedeberg on Weisseritz Railway
- Dolní Světlá - Jonsdorf, extension of narrow gauge Zittau-Jonsdorf line
- Hlučín - Chałupki (Annaberg)

== See also ==
- Freedom Train (Czechoslovakia)
- Polish rail border crossings
- Slovak rail border crossings
