= Břeclav railway station =

Railway station in Břeclav, Czech Republic

Coordinates: 48.753586°N 16.892338°E

Břeclav
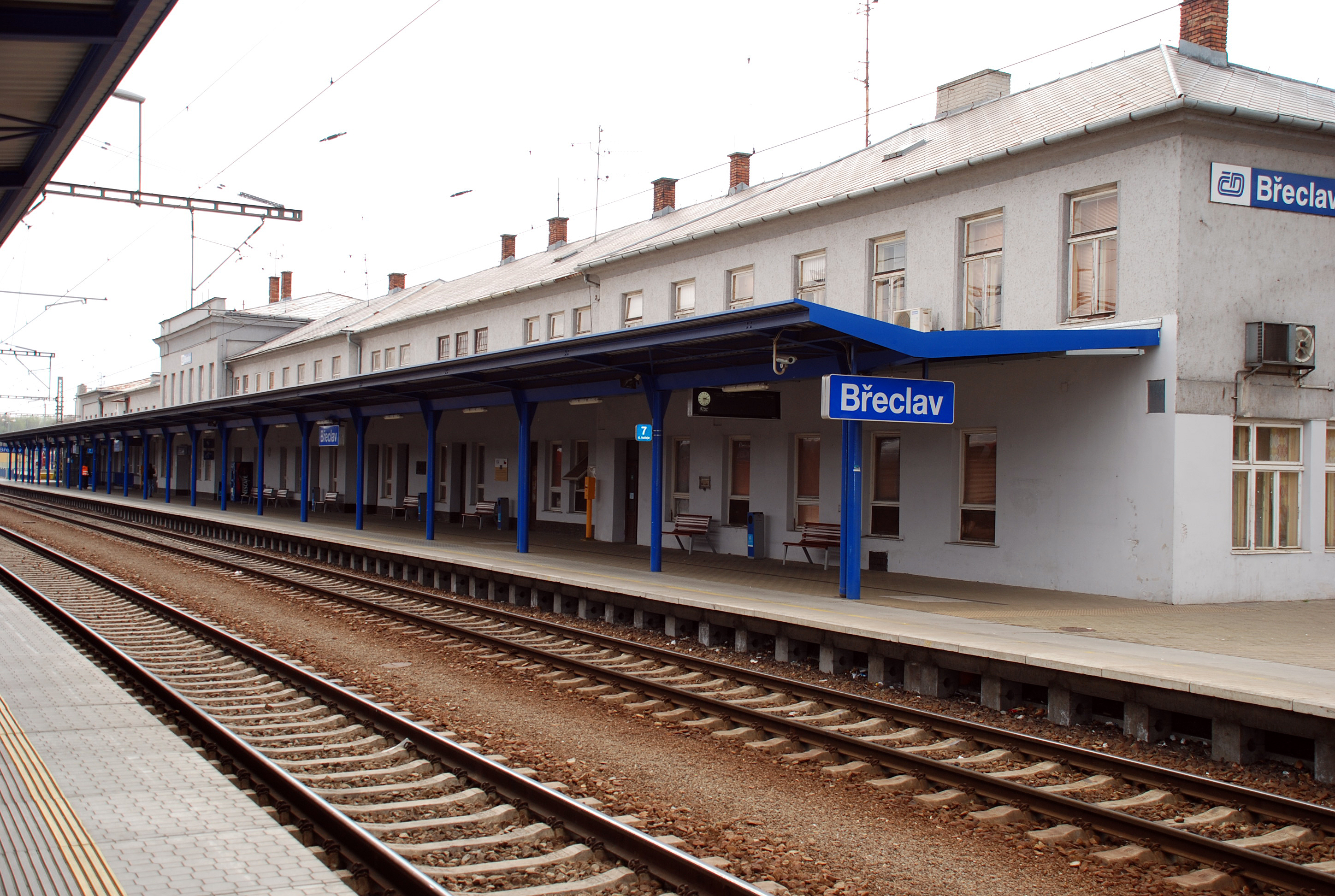
- Břeclav railway station after its 2009 refurbishment

General information
- Location: Břeclav; Czech Republic
- Owner: Czech Republic
- Platforms: 4 (8)

Other information
- Station code: 54334250

History
- Opened: 6 June 1839; 187 years ago
- Rebuilt: 1889

Services
Preceding station	PKP Intercity	Following station
Wien Hbf towards München Hbf	EuroNight	Ostrava towards Warszawa Wschodnia
Location

Břeclav railway station (Czech: Železniční stanice Břeclav) is an important international railway junction in the Czech Republic, located in the town of Břeclav in South Moravia, close to the borders with Austria and Slovakia.

The station opened 6 June 1839 as Lundenburger Bahnhof (Lundenburg is the German exonym for Břeclav) on the North railway, the first locomotive-hauled railway in Austria-Hungary. After the breakup of Austria-Hungary it became a border crossing checkpoint between Austria and Czechoslovakia. Since the Czech Republic joined the Schengen area, border checks are no longer in operation. Břeclav is the first stop across the Czech border from Austria, the next station across on Austrian territory being Bernhardsthal station. It is the second station on Czech territory after crossing the border from Slovakia after Lanžhot.

== Lines ==
Břeclav is an important international junction on two pan-European corridors. The first of these runs north-west to Brno and Prague with many services continuing to Berlin, and the second runs north-east to Přerov, Ostrava and into Poland. To the south, the line also splits; one direction leads to Vienna in Austria, while the second leads to Bratislava in Slovakia with most international services continuing to Budapest in Hungary. The station is also the eastern terminus of the Břeclav - Valtice - Mikulov - Znojmo line and its small branch line to Lednice, which is served only in the summer tourist season.

== Services ==
The station is served by three national operators. Most services are operated by České dráhy, but Austrian Federal Railways (ÖBB) operate 2-hourly local trains from Vienna, and several ŽSSK services from Slovakia terminate here.

== See also ==
- Czech rail border crossings
- Rail transport in the Czech Republic
