= Rail transport in the Czech Republic =

Czech Republic
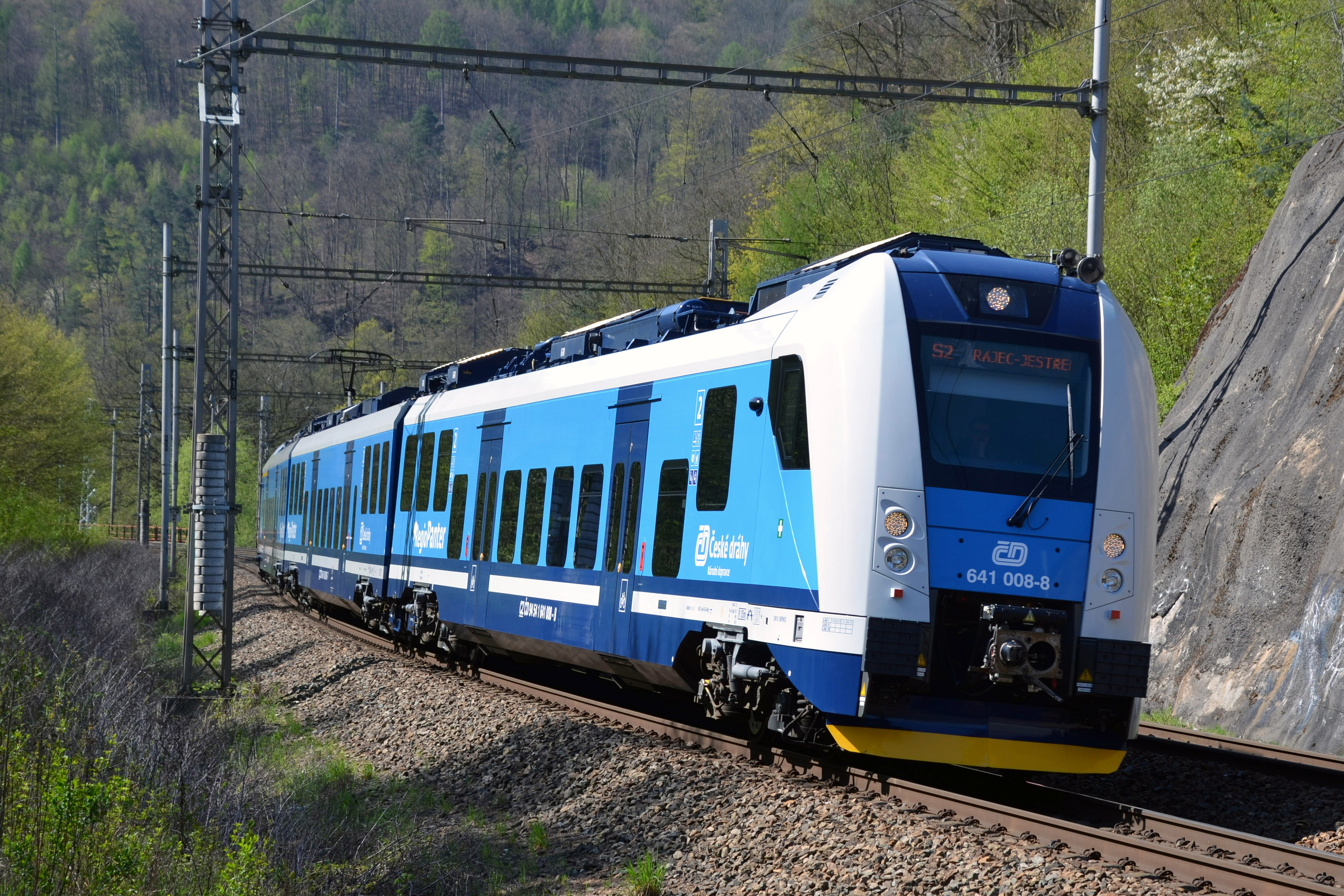
- Škoda 7Ev electric multiple unit train

Operation
- National railway: České dráhy
- Infrastructure company: Správa železnic
- Major operators: Passengers: České dráhy; RegioJet; LEO Express; Arriva; GW Train Regio; Freight: ČD Cargo; EP Cargo; METRANS

System length
- Total: 9,619 kilometres (5,977 mi)
- Double track: 1,830 kilometres (1,140 mi)
- Electrified: 2,997 kilometres (1,862 mi)
- High-speed: 0 kilometres (0 mi)

Track gauge
- Main: 1,435 mm (4 ft 8 1/2 in)

Features
- No. of tunnels: 155
- Tunnel length: 46.52 kilometres (28.91 mi)
- Longest tunnel: Ejpovice Tunnel; 4,150 metres (13,620 ft)
- Longest bridge: Negrelliho viadukt 1,110 metres (3,640 ft)
- No. of stations: 2808
- Max elevation: Kubova Huť; 995 metres (3,264 ft)
- Operating speed: 200 km/h (120 mph)
Map

Rail transport in the Czech Republic carried 193.5 million passengers in 2019, and 68.37 million tonnes of cargo in the year 2009. The majority of passenger services run nowadays are operated by the state company České dráhy (Czech Railways), which until 2007 also managed cargo services now run by ČD Cargo. In 2009 the country had 9,420 km of standard gauge track, 3,153 km of which is electrified. There are two main electrification systems in the Czech Republic, 3 kV DC in the northern part, and 25 kV 50 Hz AC in the south (in addition, one historical 24 km long line uses 1.5 kV DC; and since 2009 one short local line to Austria uses 15 kV 16.7 Hz AC). Locomotives had to be changed on boundaries in the past, two-system locomotives have been introduced in 1974. The network has same gauge links to all four countries bordering the Czech Republic (Slovakia, Austria, Germany and Poland) with passenger services to all four countries in operation. Major hubs for international passenger services on the network are in Prague, Ostrava, Brno and Břeclav, and the busiest station (by number of passengers) is Praha hlavní nádraží. The maximum speed for passenger traffic is 200 km/h (120 mph).

== History ==
The history of rail transport in the territory of the present-day Czech Republic dates back to the Austro-Hungarian empire. The first horse-drawn railway in Europe, between České Budějovice and Linz (in present-day Austria) commenced operations in 1832, and the first locomotive-hauled railway from Vienna to Břeclav opened seven years later. Throughout the rest of the 19th century the rail network in the whole of Europe grew rapidly and after the First World War and the independence of Czechoslovakia, the company Československé státní dráhy (Czechoslovak state railways) was founded. From 1948 until the Velvet Revolution the border crossings with Austria and West Germany were strictly controlled and only a limited number of trains was operated. Following the fall of communism, the railway network was reopened to Western Europe; the first EuroCity trains operated in transitional Czechoslovakia in 1991. In the 21st century the network has undergone extensive modernisations, and newer rolling stock (such as the Class 680 "pendolino") have been introduced.

== Operation ==
Most of the Czech railway network is maintained by Správa železnic, a state-owned company. In 2010, the Czech government proposed merging Správa železnic (then-called SŽDC) and České dráhy to a single company. In 2011, RegioJet, a subsidiary of Student Agency, became the first company to actively compete with České dráhy on a route, launching a service between Prague and Havířov. Other private companies own exclusive rights to run services on certain lines. The Czech Republic is a member of the International Union of Railways (UIC) and has the country code 54.

== Rail links to adjacent countries ==
- Austria – voltage change 25 kV 50 Hz AC to 15 kV 16.7 Hz AC
- Germany – voltage change 3 kV DC to 15 kV 16.7 Hz AC
- Poland – same voltage 3 kV DC
- Slovakia – same voltage 3 kV DC (north) and 25 kV 50 Hz AC (south)

Several border crossings did not survive political changes in 1918 or 1945. However, some of them were renewed after 1989. Border crossings with regular passenger traffic as of 2023:

- Germany – 11
- Austria – 4
- Slovakia – 5
- Poland – 8

== Modern and historical railway maps ==
Maps of railways in the Czech Republic
Railways in the Czech Republic

Electrified main lines in the Czech Republic

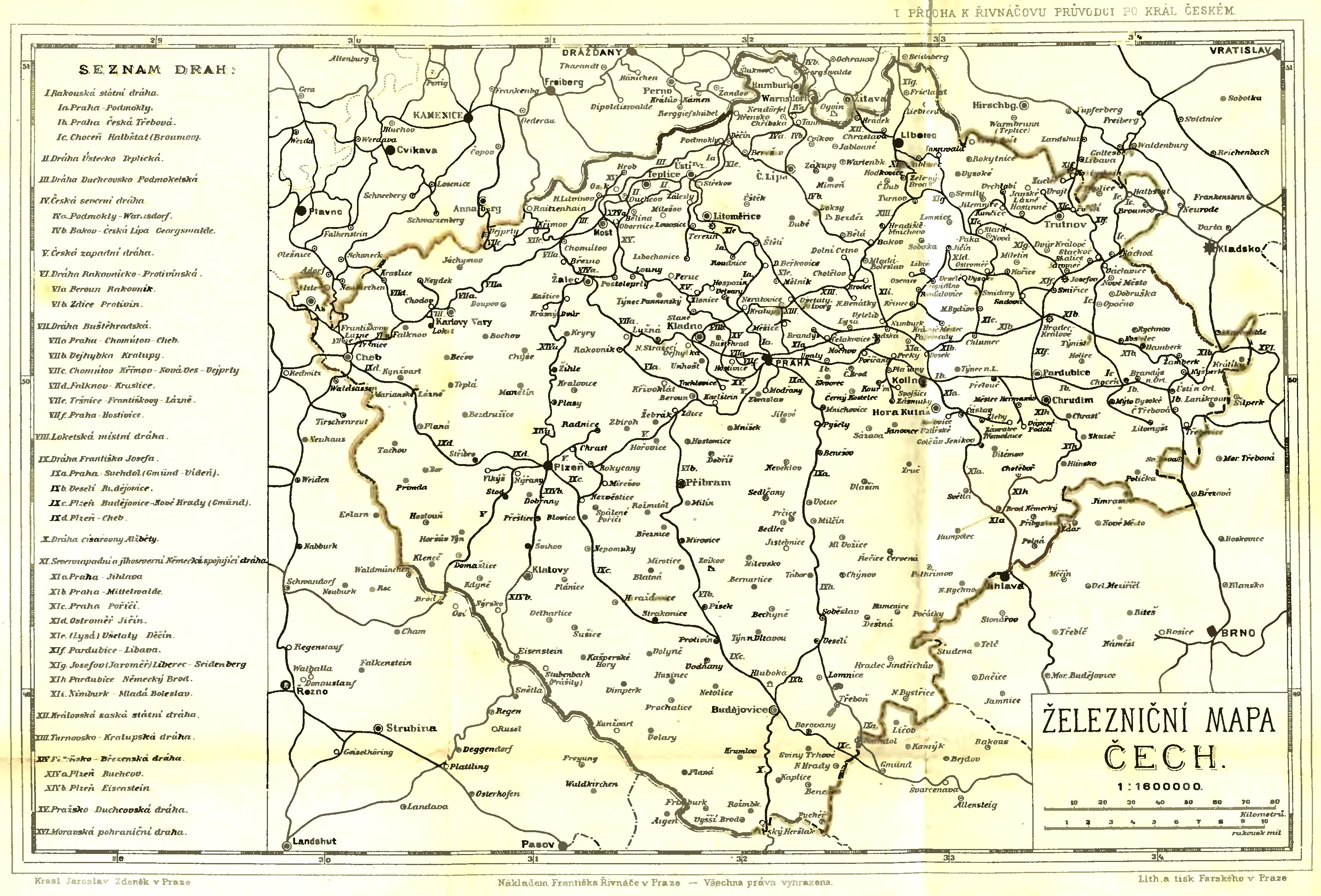
1883 railway map of Kingdom of Bohemia

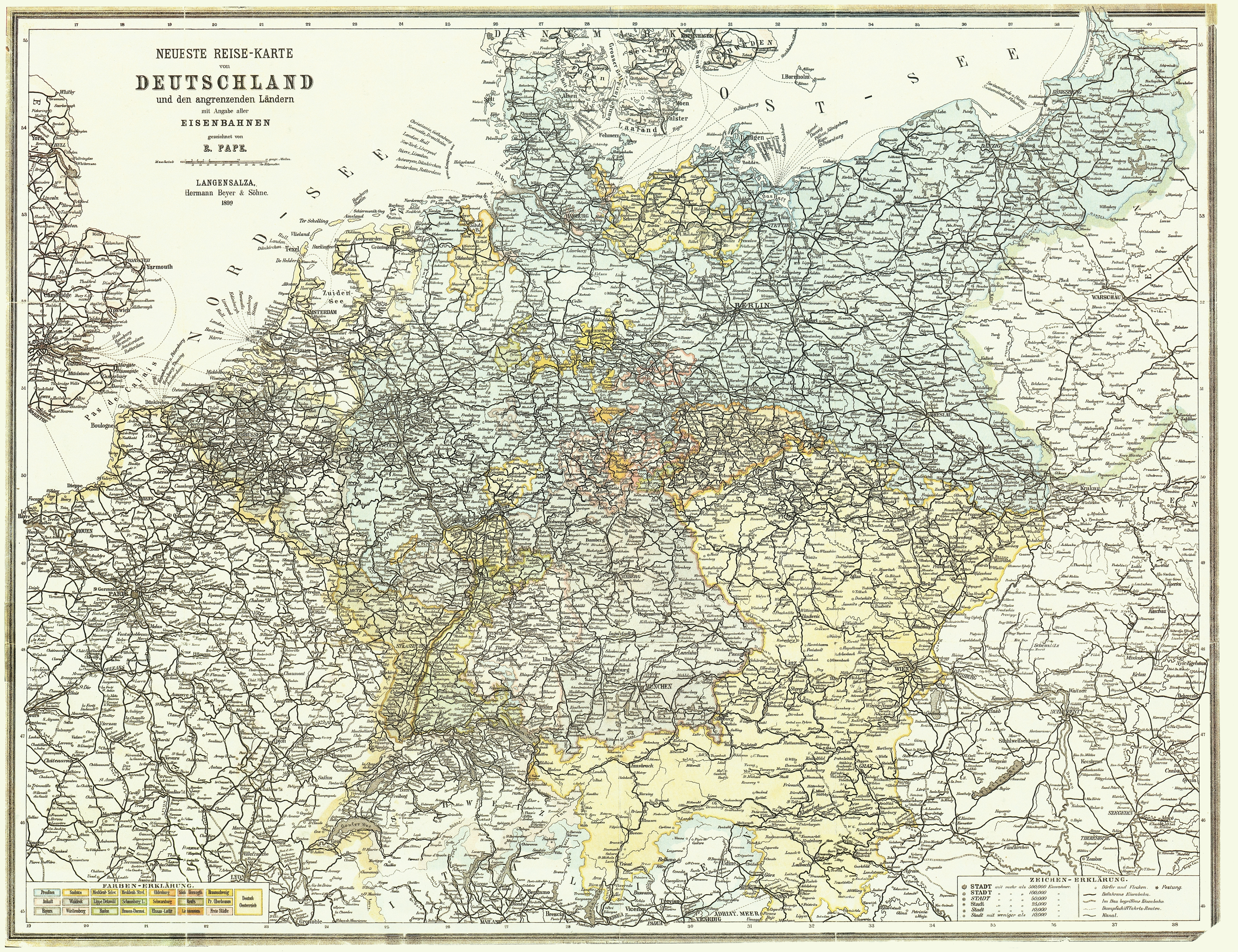
1899 railway map of Western Central Europe

== Gallery ==
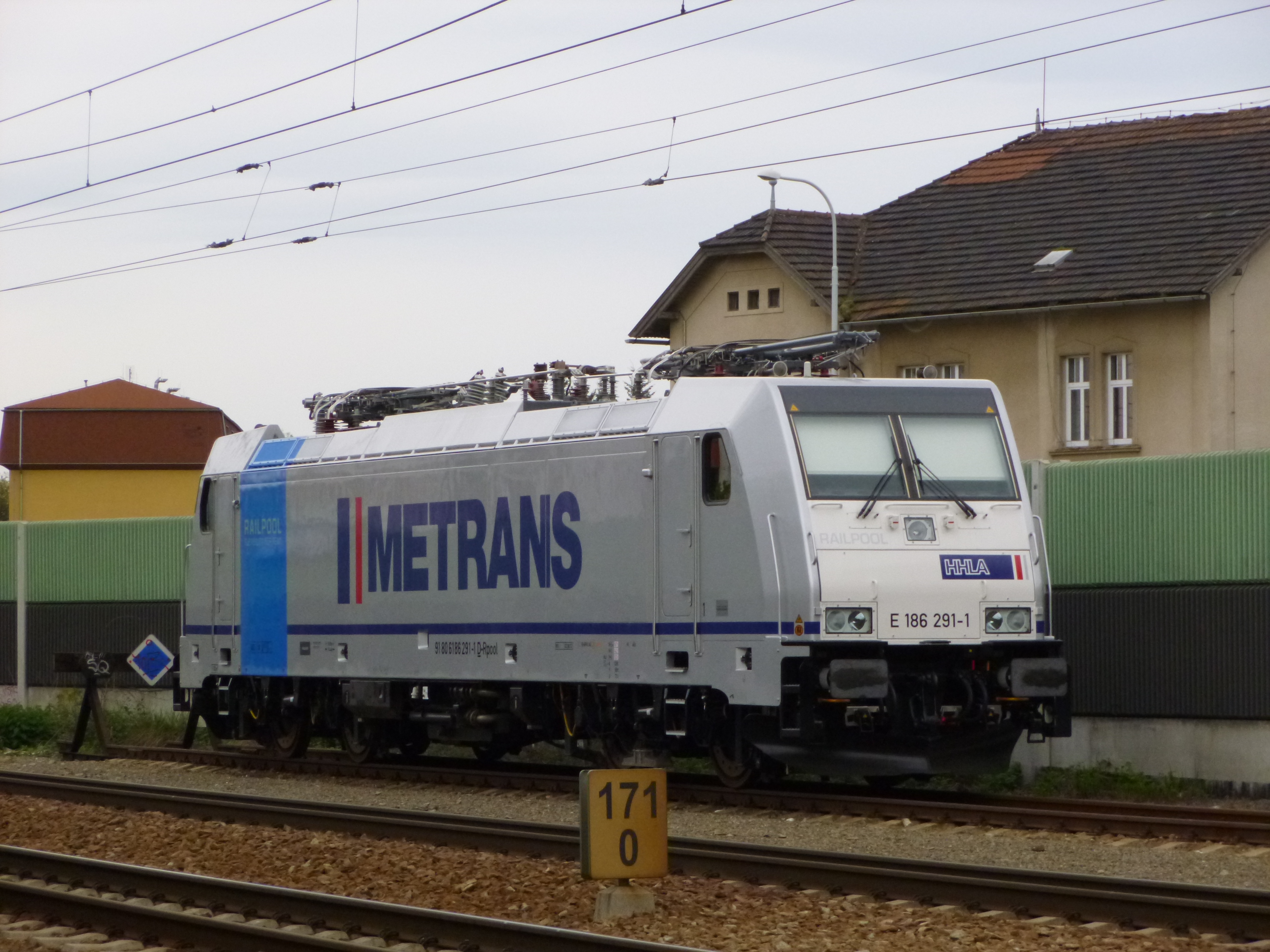

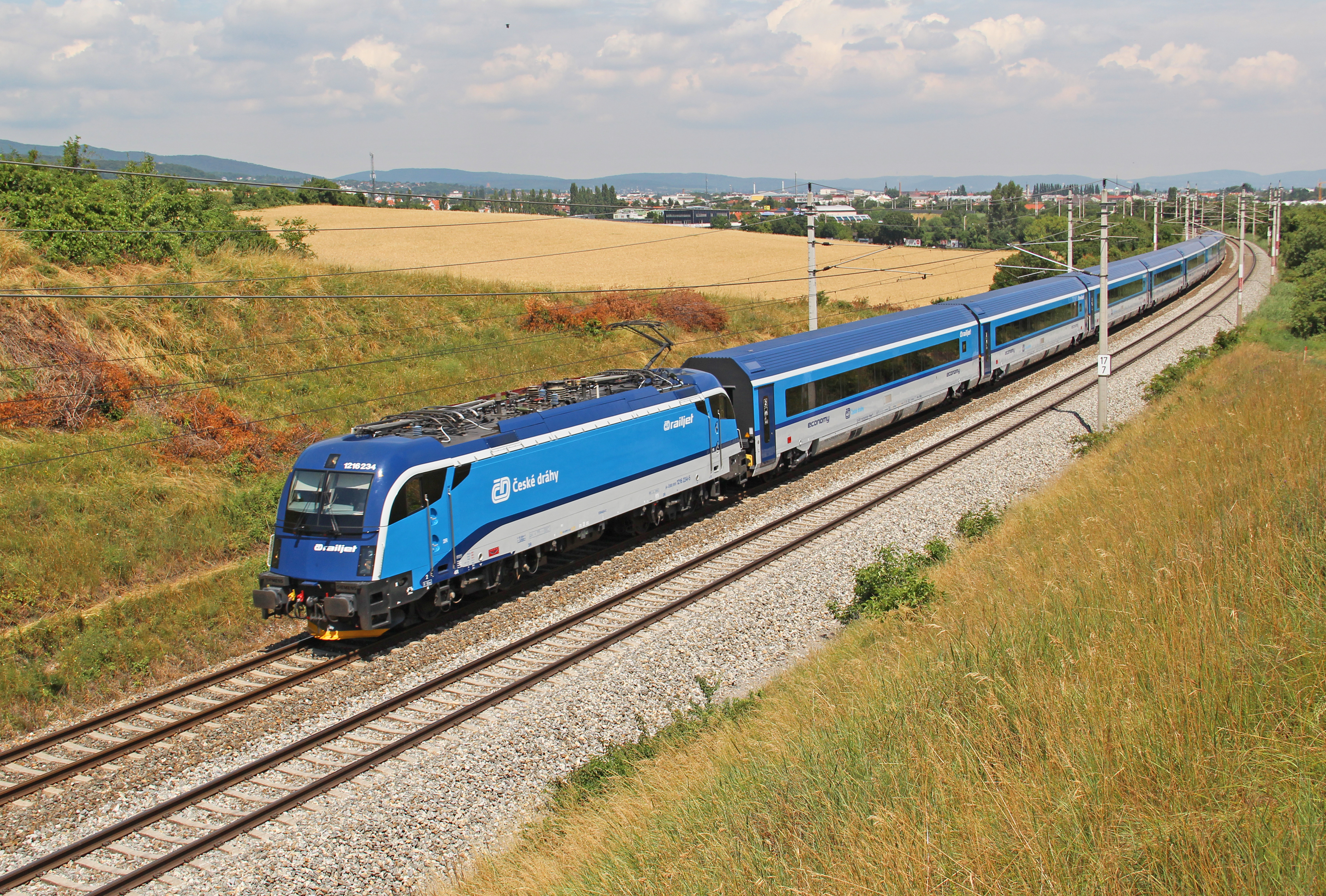

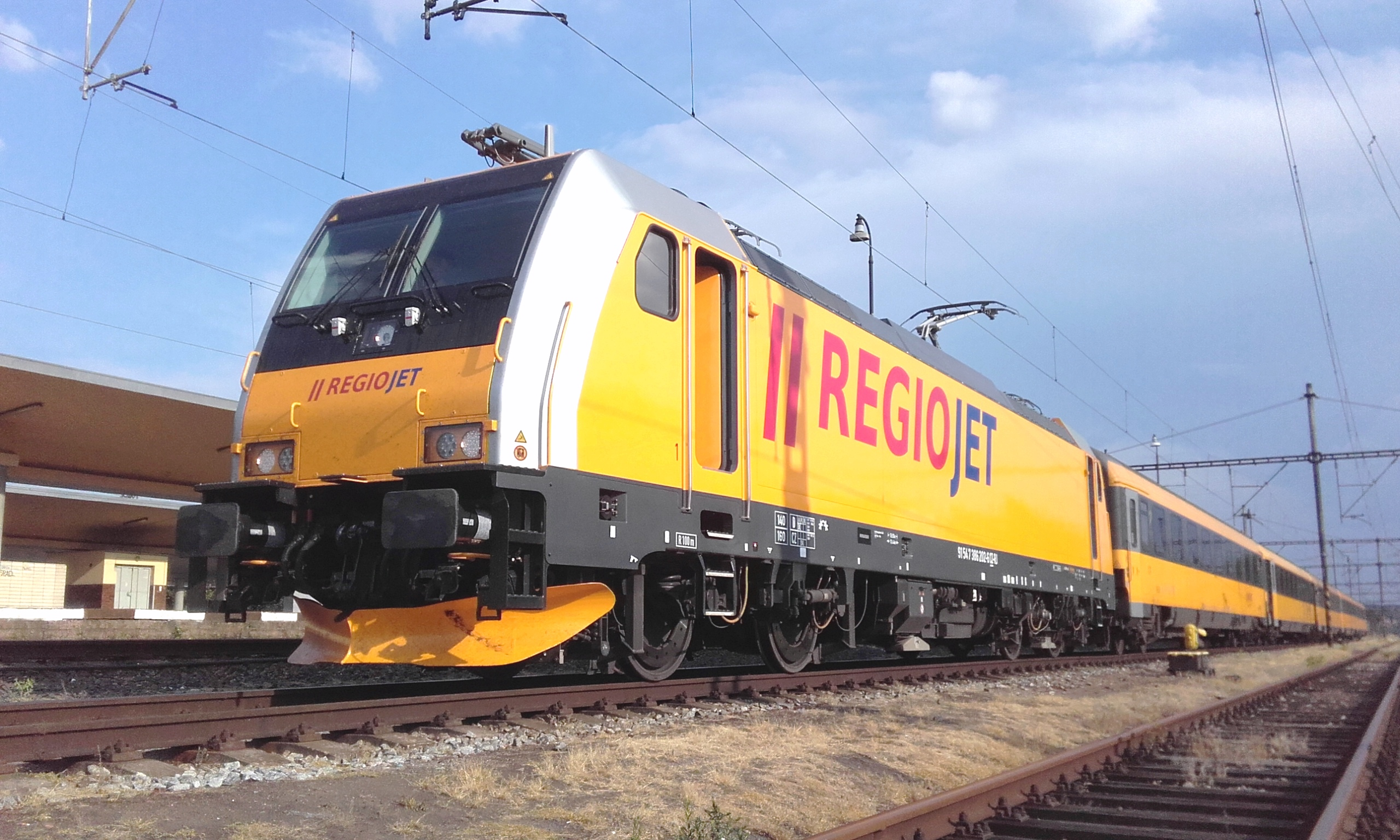

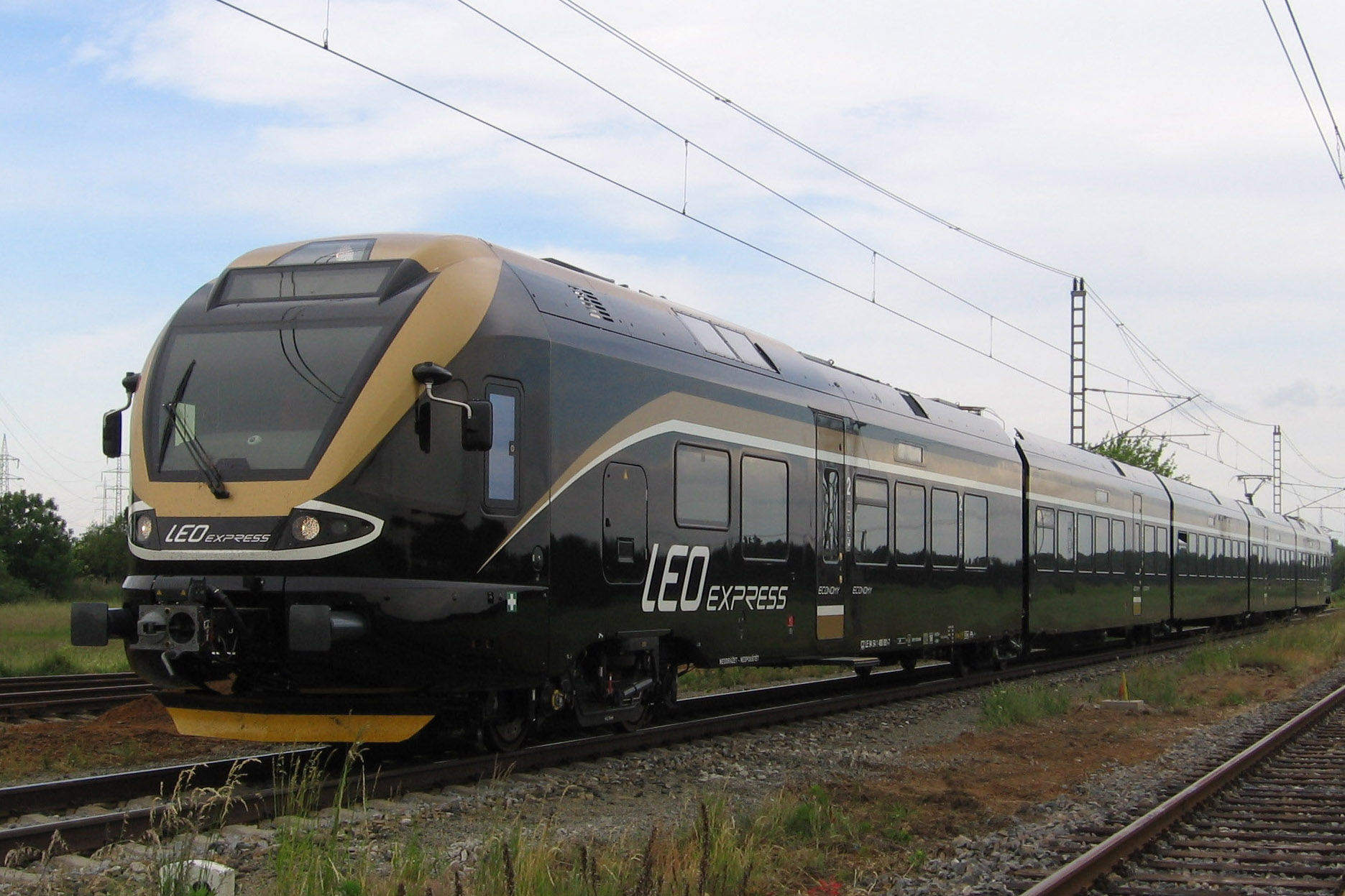

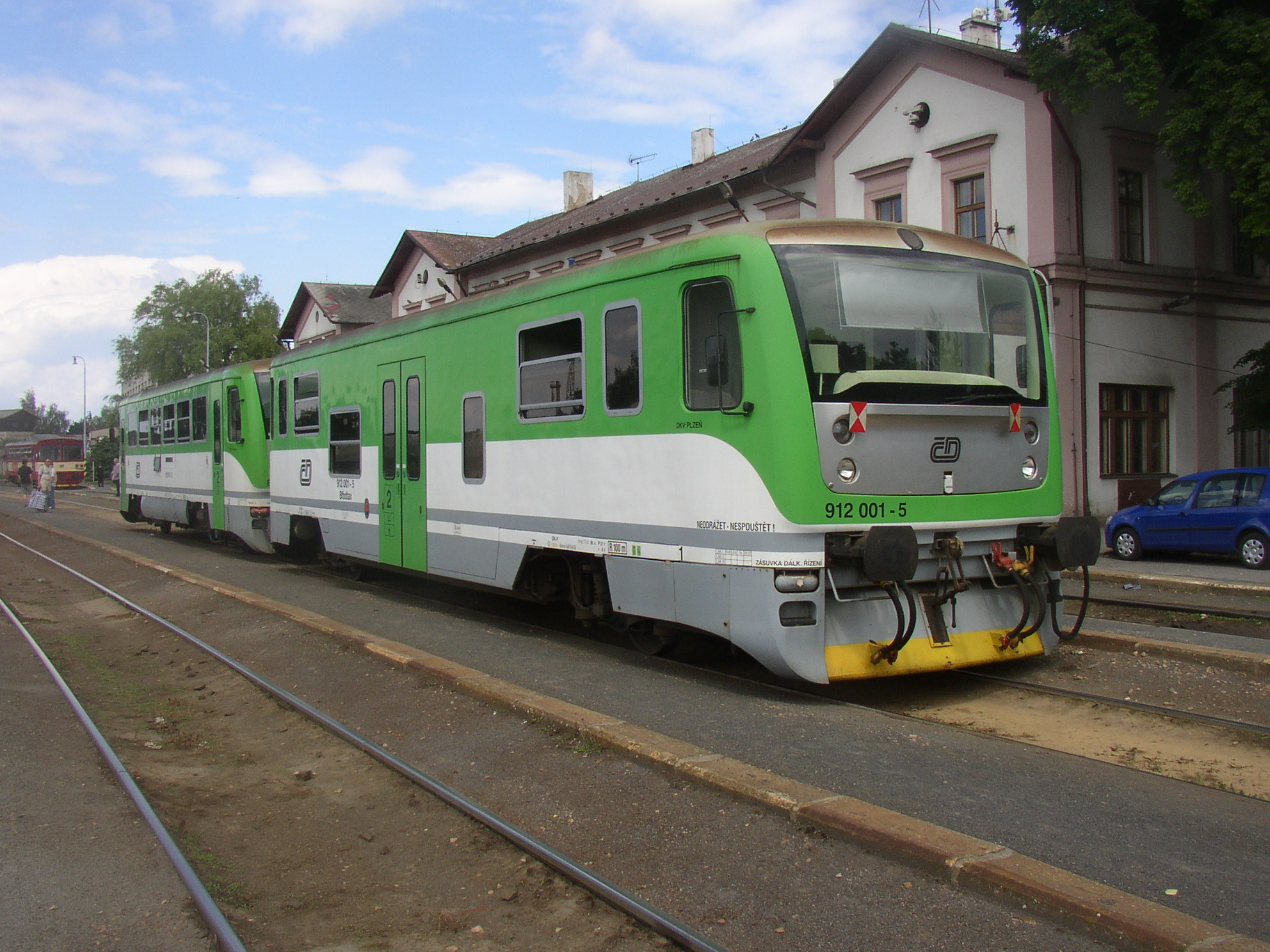

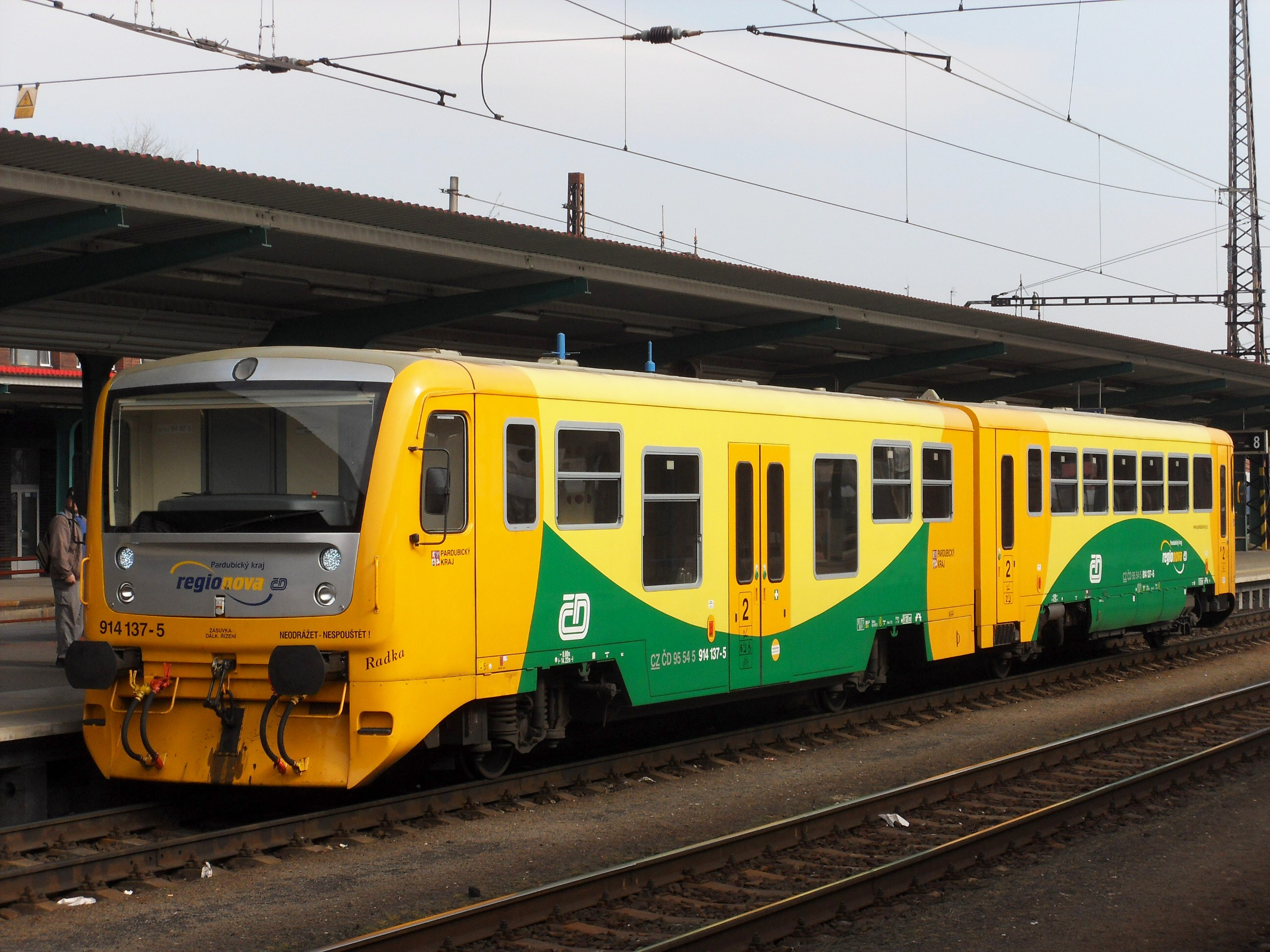

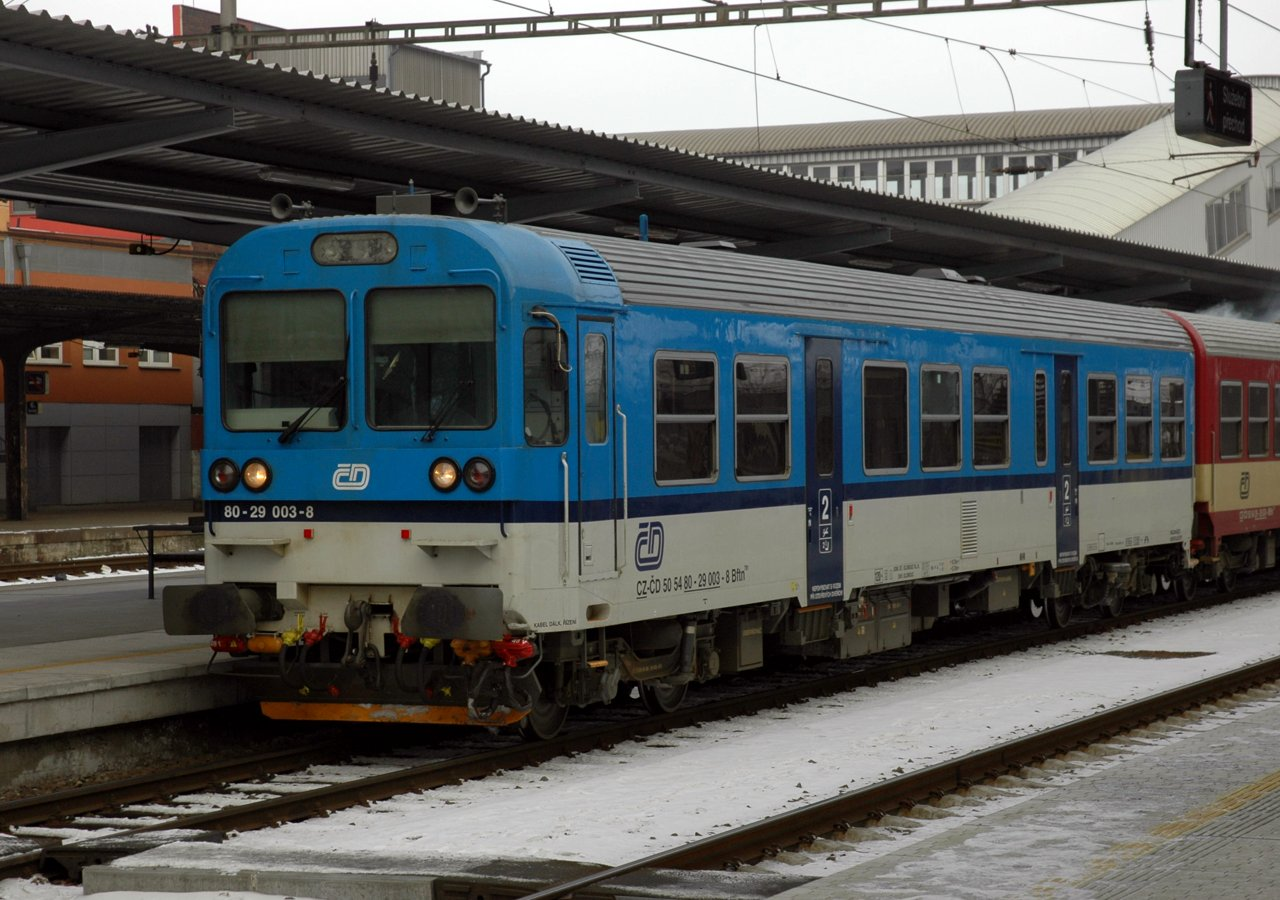

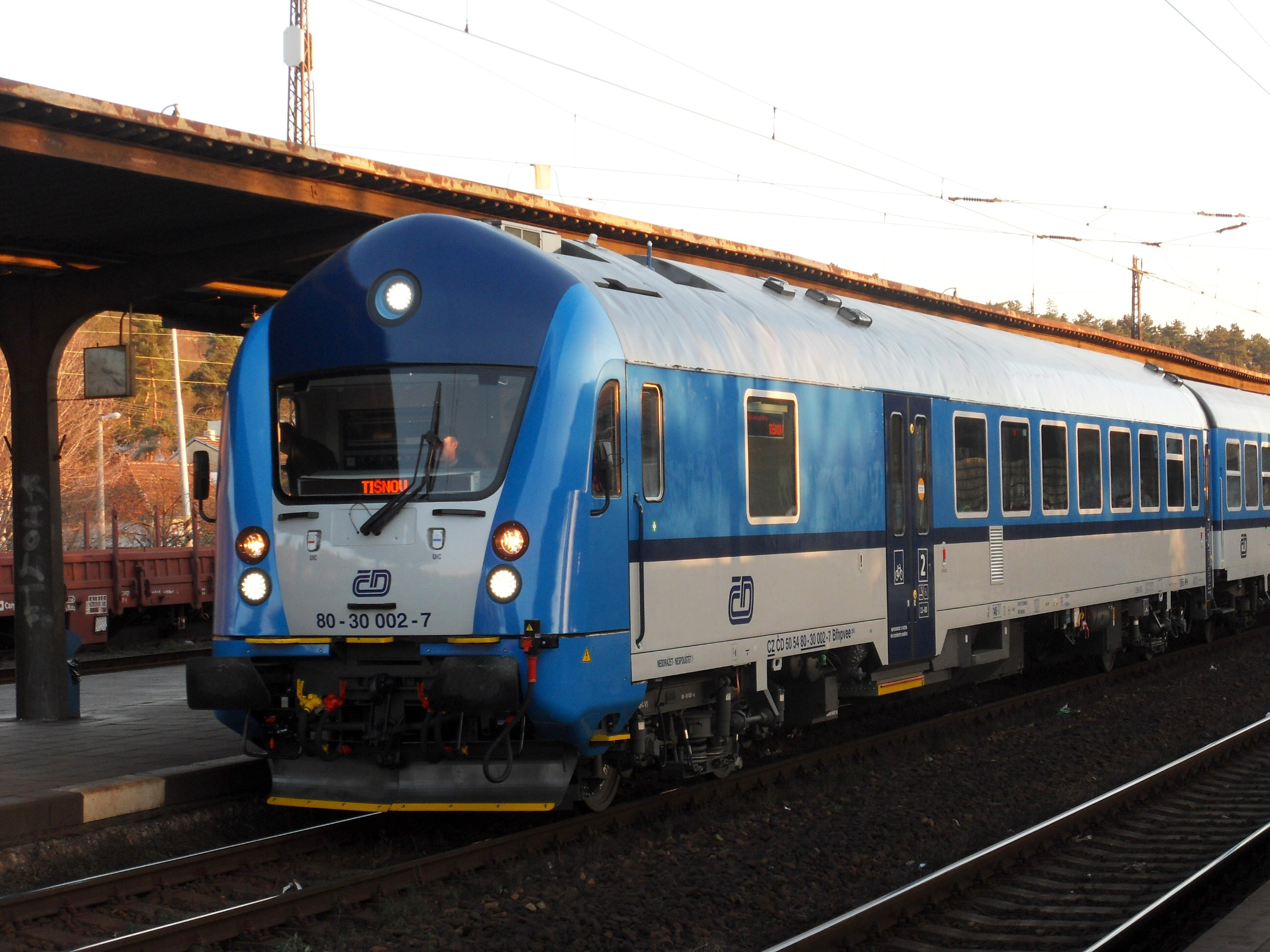

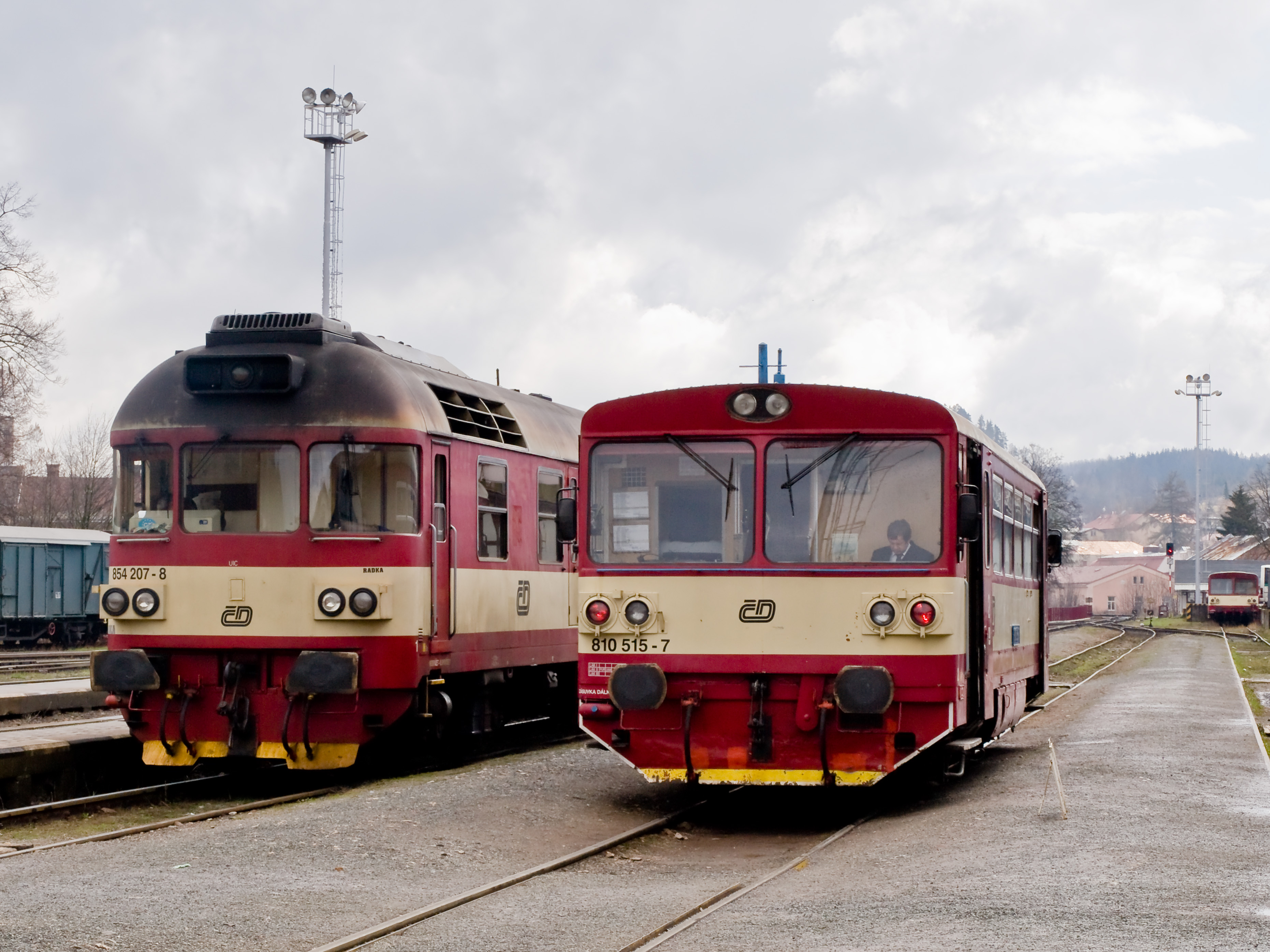

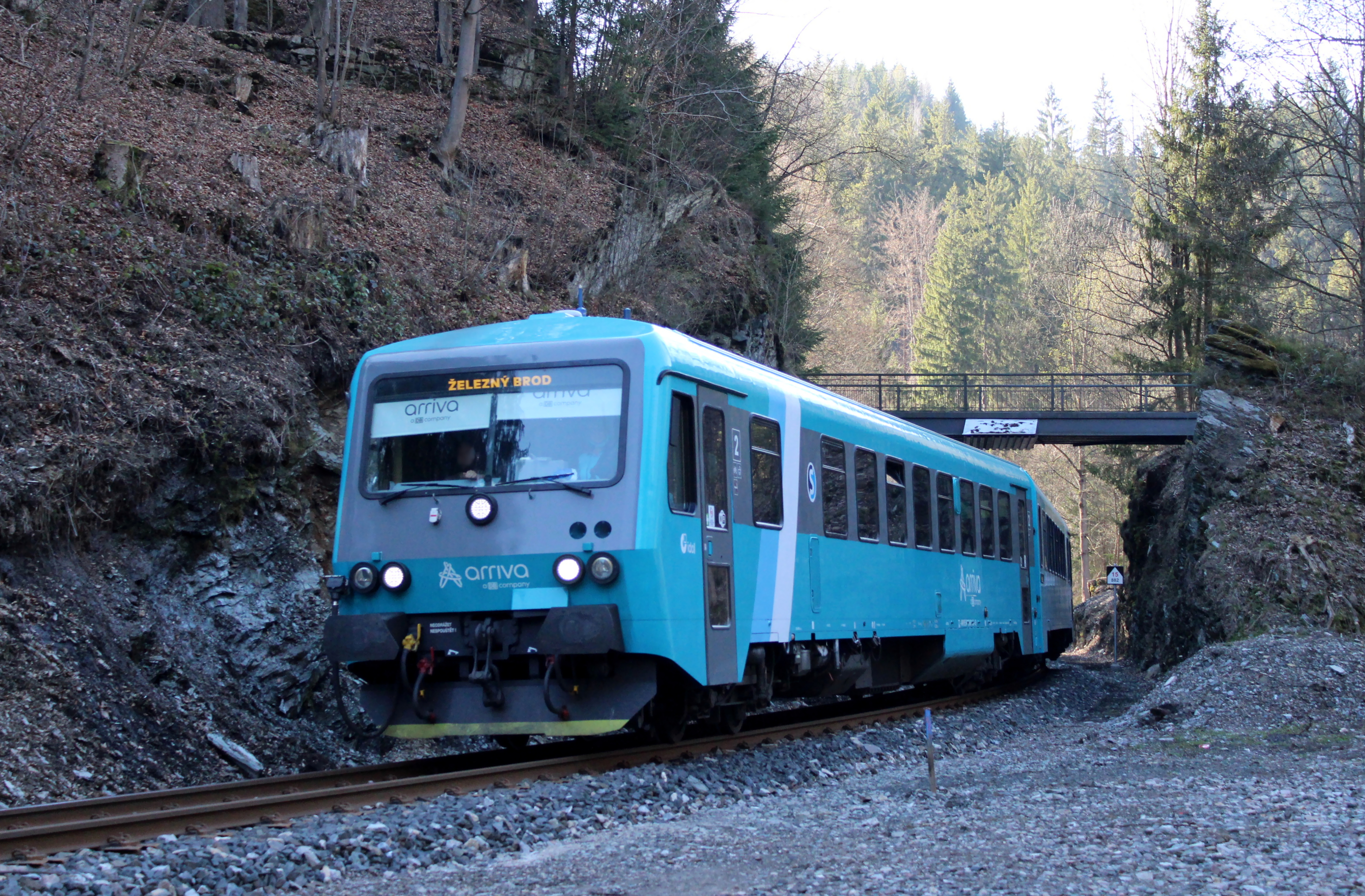

== See also ==
- Czech rail border crossings
- History of rail transport in the Czech Republic
- Narrow gauge railways in the Czech Republic
- High-speed rail in the Czech Republic
- List of Czech locomotive classes
