= Freedom Train (Czechoslovakia) =

In the Czech Republic, the Freedom Train (in Czech: Vlak svobody) was the mass escape of opponents of the Czechoslovak communist regime across the West German border on 11 September 1951 involving State Railways train No. 3717.

At a time when divisions between the Communist-dominated Eastern bloc and the countries of Western Europe were consolidating, the diversion of the train across the heavily policed border between Czechoslovakia and the American-occupied zone of Germany is considered one of the most significant mass escapes from a communist country to the West. The success of the enterprise was acclaimed around the world and led the communist authorities to tighten the Iron Curtain. The incident also led to the removal of the railroad tracks at abandoned Czech border crossings to prevent similar incidents.

== Background ==
The hijacking of the train was organized by train driver Jaroslav Konvalinka, train dispatcher Karel Truksa, Jaroslav Švec, a physician, and Karel Ruml, who later described his experience in the book Z deníku vlaku svobody (From the Diary of the Freedom Train).

Karel Ruml had been active in the anti-communist resistance movement since 1949. As a member of the right-wing organization Všehrd, he was expelled from his studies at the Faculty of Law of Charles University in Prague and, soon after, he joined a group smuggling secret documents from the Soviet Union to a French intelligence agency. In late 1949, he met an old friend in Nymburk in Central Bohemia. During their conversation, they were arrested by the StB (Czechoslovak State Security Service). Ruml's friend, Vlasta "Bůňa" Krejčí, was subsequently sentenced to life imprisonment. Ruml himself was released without further consequences. The incident and the growing atmosphere of fear and repression by the state apparatus gradually strengthened his intention to leave Czechoslovakia. In 1951, his girlfriend told him about a planned illegal border crossing by train. The chief organizer was her uncle František Šilhart, a former editor of the magazine Americké Listy (American Letters). Šilhart decided to stay in Czechoslovakia and continue illegal anti-state activities. His son Vladimír travelled on the train instead. Karel Ruml only joined up with the other hijackers on the train, where he was contacted by Truksa.

== The hijacking ==
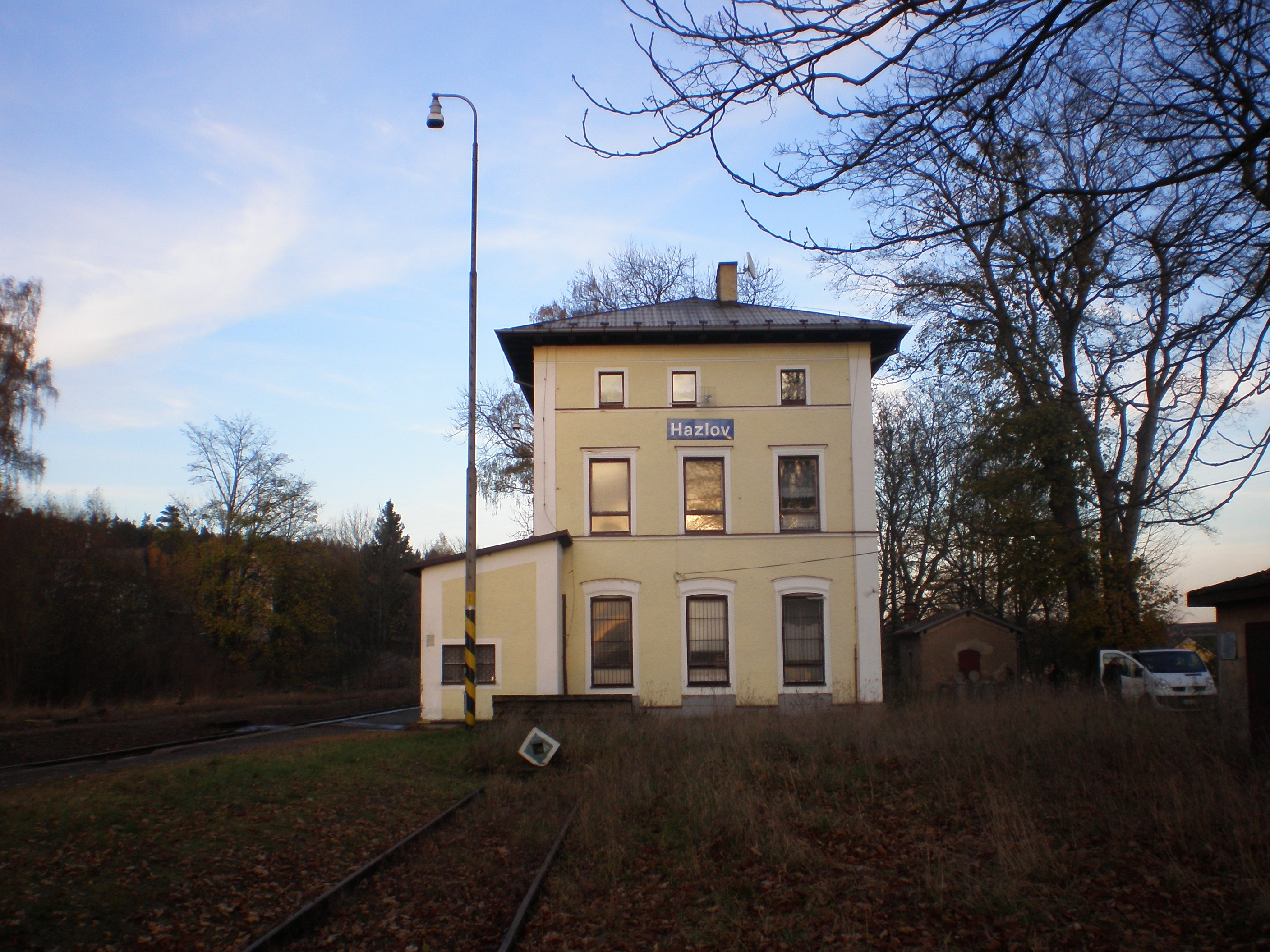
Hazlov station, 2008

On 11 September 1951, the express train to Cheb set off from Prague at 9:55 a.m. It was divided in Cheb at 2:12 p.m.; three carriages proceeding onward to Aš. When the train arrived at Hazlov—the station before Aš—the driver deliberately delayed it by four minutes. Under cover of inspection of the carriage brakes, he disabled the emergency brakes. Jaroslav Švec boarded at Hazlov. His task was to signal whether the railroad switch at Aš had been switched in the direction of the West German border, which happened irregularly.

The train approached Aš shortly before 3 p.m. and Švec gave the signal. The train decelerated and rolled up on the station at its normal speed before it accelerated again and passed through the station, all the while still picking up speed. Passengers were unaware of what was happening and panic erupted. Most were high school students and patients of the spa at Františkovy Lázně (more than 70 returned). A few State Security and State Police officers were on board as passengers as well – they regularly rode on trains passing close by the borders of Western-allied states. Officers tried to reach the emergency brakes that had been installed on all carriages but found them guarded by armed hijackers.

The train sped on and crashed through a barrier placed across the track at the border. It carried on for another kilometer into West Germany before it came to a halt. State Security and State Police officers got off and immediately made for the Czechoslovak border. The plot organizers preferred to continue until the train was farther away from the border, but the driver was unwilling to take the risk due to his unfamiliarity with local track conditions. While the plot organizers explained to the shocked passengers that their action had been planned in advance, a jeep approached. The train driver was ordered by German and U.S. officials to proceed to nearby Selb.

== Afterwards ==
In Selb, the train was met by a number of reporters and journalists. Karel Ruml, who was the only English speaking person among the hijackers, received an offer (along with Truksa and Konvalinka) from the Americans to undertake a US tour talking about their unusual escape. Ruml asked them to conceal his identity in order to protect family members still in Czechoslovakia. After a month, the group of hijackers and their families (who had left the country with them) moved to Canada, where they received the residence visas. Their case was widely publicized by the Western media, including The New York Times, The Globe and Mail and The Los Angeles Times.

Ruml, Konvalinka and Truksa later moved to the United States to live. Vladimír Šilhart went to Great Britain.

In response, the Communist regime in Czechoslovakia organized trials of the people involved in the incident and other groups collaborating in anti-state activities. The first nine defendants were sentenced to 162 years in prison. František Šilhart was sentenced to death. However, his sentence was commuted to life imprisonment and he was released in the 1960s. The actress Jiřina Štěpničková was among the 171 suspects interrogated in association with the case. She was sentenced to 15 years in prison.

== Literature ==
- Pečinka, Bohumil (31 May 2001). "Vlak svobody". Reflex (in Czech) (22): 52–54. ISSN 0862-6634.
- Benešová, Hana (2011). "Vlak svobody". Reflex (in Czech). 22 (38): 74–79. ISSN 0862-6634.
