= Laa an der Thaya =

- Municipality
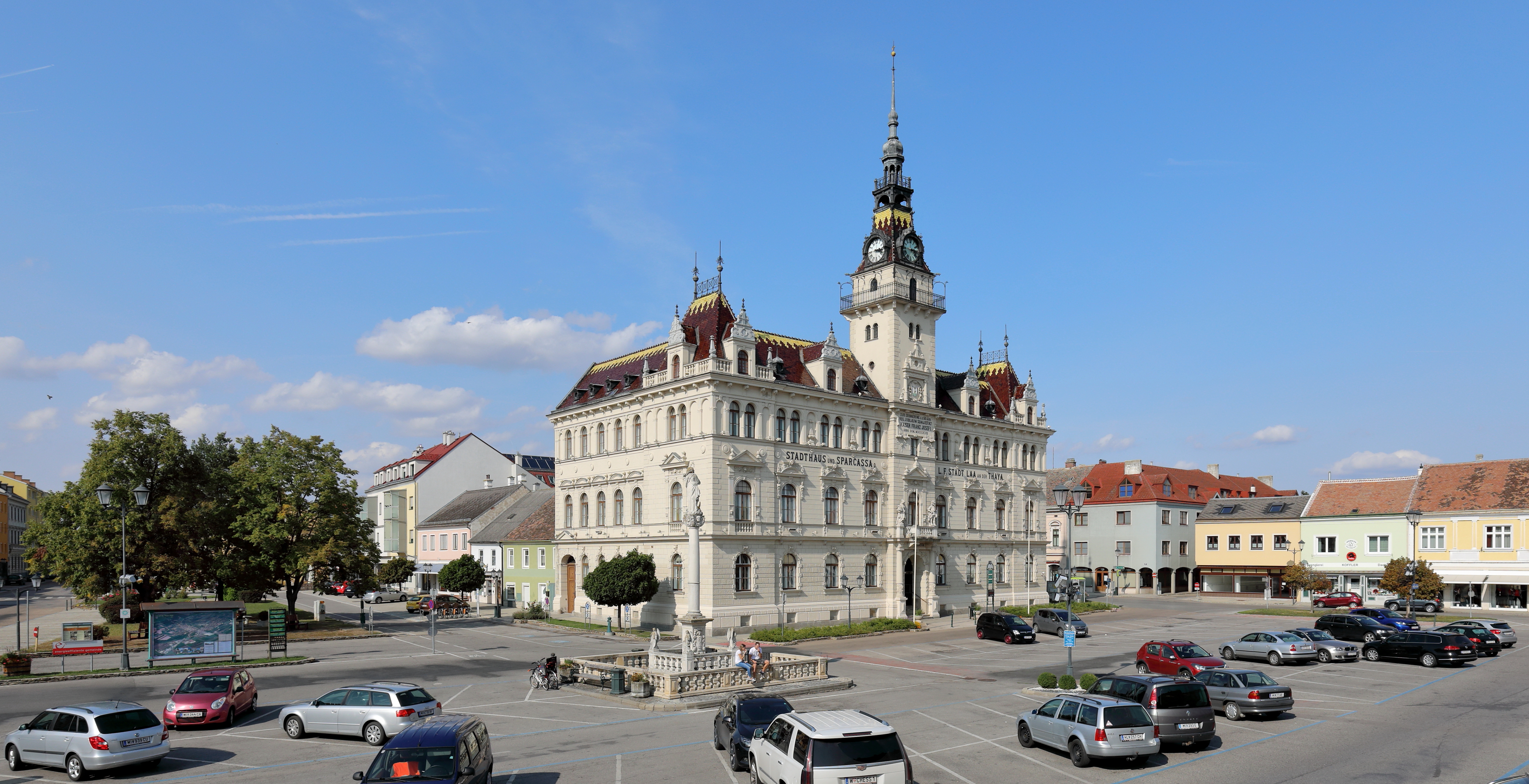
- Town hall

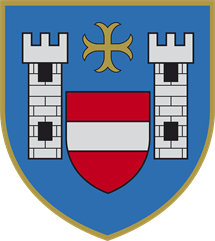
- Coat of arms

- Location within Austria
- Coordinates: 48°43′N 16°23′E
- Country: Austria
- State: Lower Austria
- District: Mistelbach

Government
  - Mayor: Brigitte Ribisch (ÖVP)

Area
  - Total: 72.91 km^{2} (28.15 sq mi)
- Elevation: 183 m (600 ft)

Population (2018-01-01)
  - Total: 6,280
  - Density: 86.1/km^{2} (223/sq mi)
- Time zone: UTC+1 (CET)
  - Summer (DST): UTC+2 (CEST)
- Postal code: 2136
- Area code: 02522
- Website: www.laa.at

Laa an der Thaya is a town in the Mistelbach District of Lower Austria in Austria, near the Czech border. The population in 2016 was 6,224.

== Geography ==
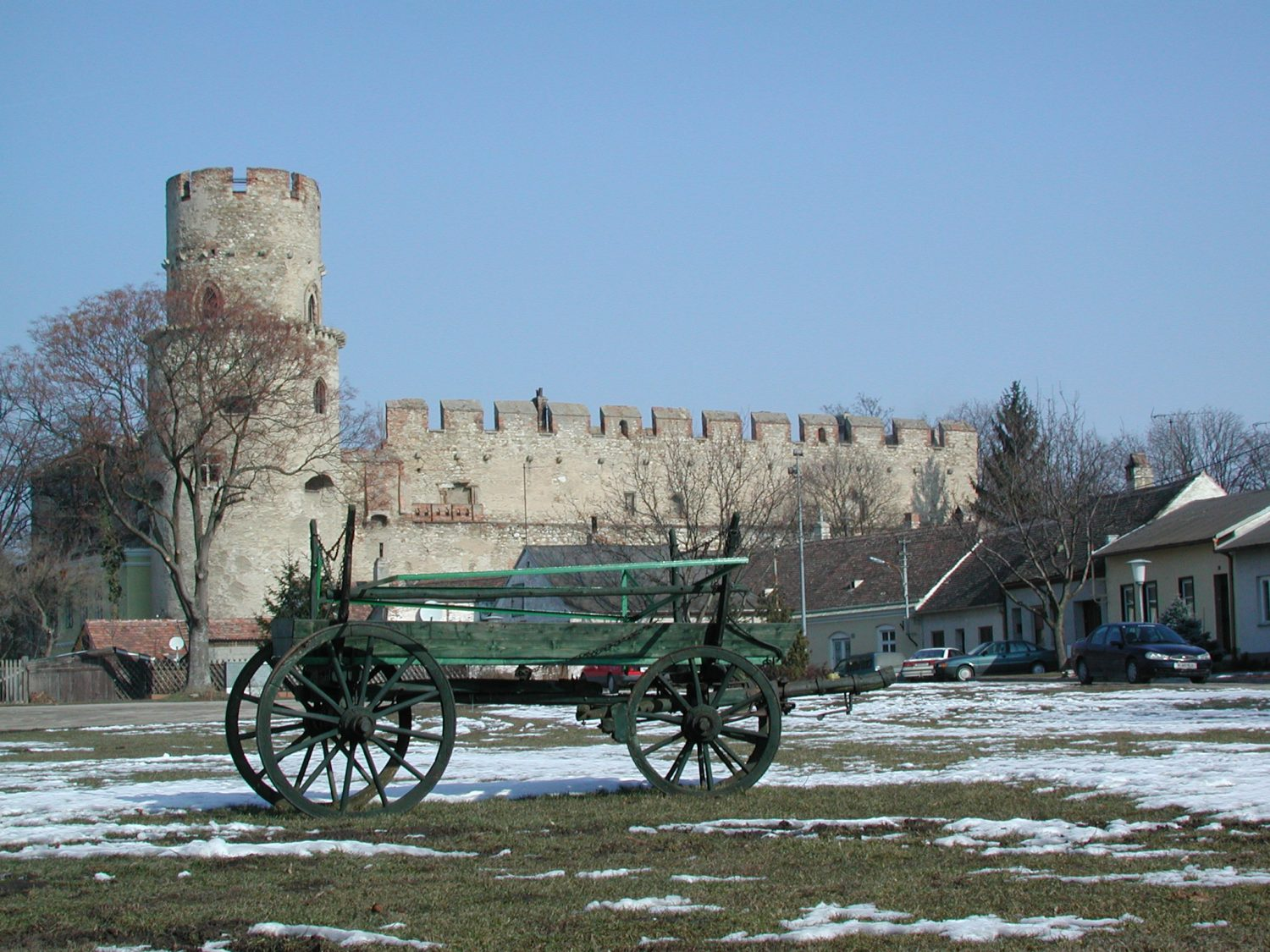
Laa Castle

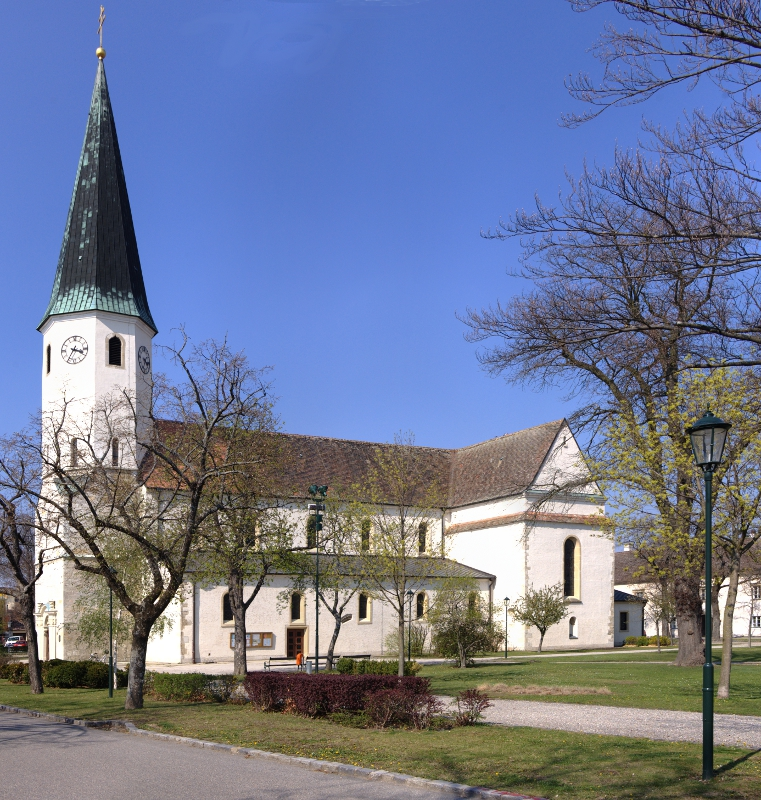
St Vitus Church

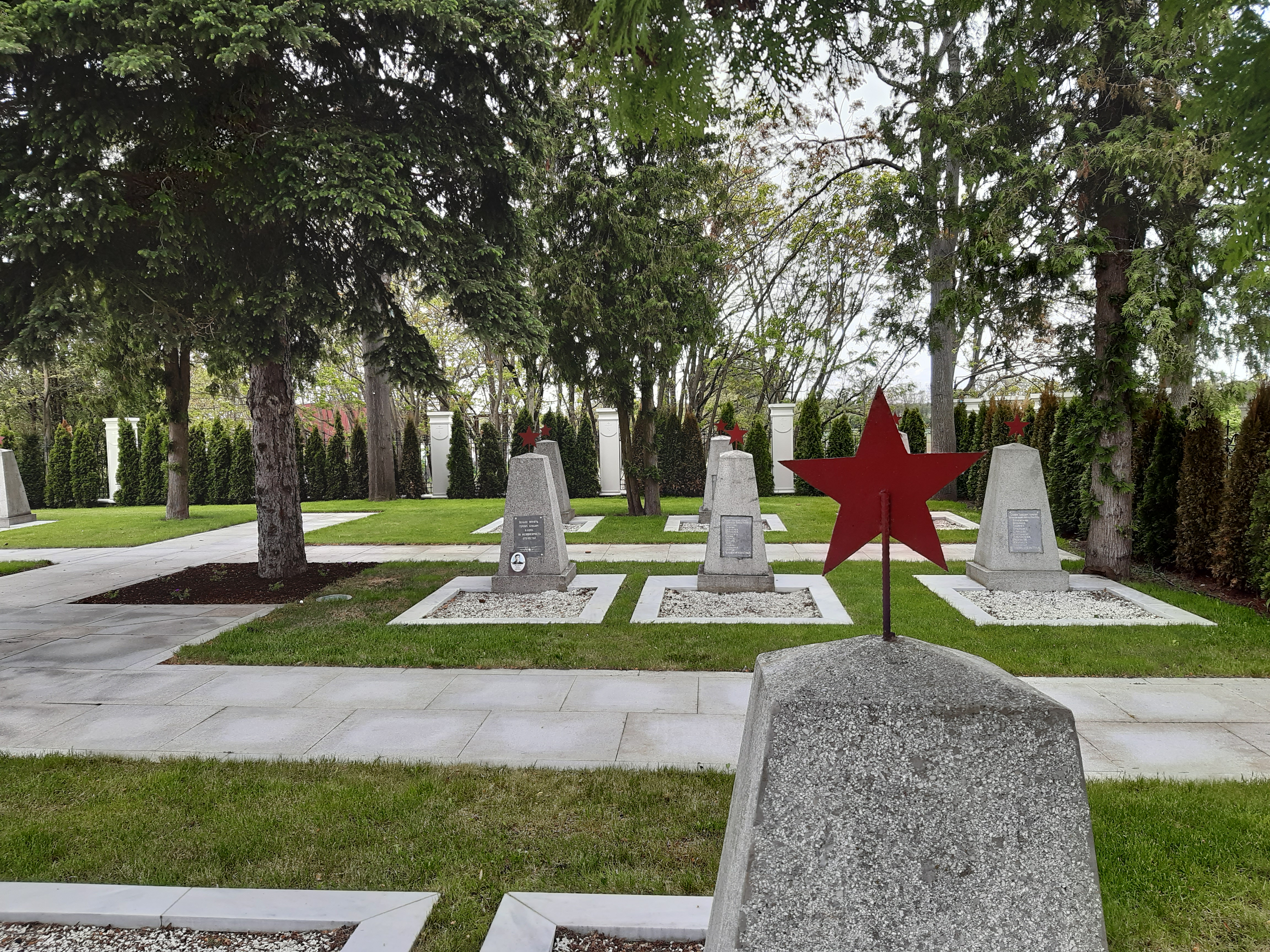
Military cemetery

The town is located in the northern Weinviertel region, near the Thaya river, directly at the border with South Moravia. The municipal area includes the cadastral communities of Hanfthal, Kottingneusiedl, Pernhofen, Ungerndorf, and Wulzeshofen.

== History ==
A settlement at a ford across the Thaya existed already in the 12th century, before the estates were acquired by the Babenberg dukes of Austria about 1190. Duke Leopold VI of Austria about 1230 had the walled town of Laa laid out as a strategic outpost at the border with the Kingdom of Bohemia in the north. His successor Duke Frederick the Quarrelsome used it as a military base for his Bohemian campaigns, until he was finally killed in battle in 1246. The erection of the St Vitus parish church was begun about 1240, it is today one of the largest preserved Romanesque church buildings in Lower Austria.

Laa's town privileges were confirmed when the Austrian lands had passed to King Ottokar II of Bohemia, and again in 1281 by the Habsburg ruler King Rudolph I of Germany after his victory in the Battle on the Marchfeld. Nevertheless, the town's significance decreased over the following decades, it was devastated by the troops of Margrave Jobst of Moravia in 1407 and again in 1426 by Hussite forces. According to legend, the later Pope Pius II (Enea Silvio Piccolomini) worked as a priest at the Laa parish church from 1442, actually he served as papal legate to the Imperial Diet and counsellor of Emperor Frederick III. To improve Laa's economy, the citizens were granted the privilege of brewing in 1454.

During the Thirty Years' War, the town was first occupied by Bohemian troops until the 1620 Battle of White Mountain, later by Swedish forces, who left Laa in a desolate condition. It remained a sedate county town when Napoleon marched through in 1809 during the War of the Fifth Coalition. However, Laa's development was promoted by the opening of a railway connection to Austria's capital Vienna in 1869, with a branch line of the Eastern Railway which led on to Hevlín and Brno (Brünn) in Moravia. Another branch via Pulkau to Zellerndorf which connected to the Vienna-Znojmo railway line opened in 1873.

Laa again became a border town after World War I with the establishment of the First Czechoslovak Republic; at the end of World War II it bordered the "Iron Curtain" dividing Europe. In June 2005, about 250 townspeople and 80 visitors from the US, Israel and Europe with historical family links to former Jewish citizens of Laa an der Thaya assembled with Mayor Fass to dedicate a memorial to the members of 33 Jewish families of Laa murdered by the SS in Auschwitz. This memorial was only the second official memorial dedicated to the memory of Austria's Jews.

== Politics ==
Since October 7, 2015 Brigitte Ribisch is the mayor of Laa an der Thaya. Seats in the municipal assembly (Gemeinderat) as of 2015 elections:

- Austrian People's Party (ÖVP): 13
- Social Democratic Party of Austria (SPÖ): 6
- proLAA (Independent): 8
- Freedom Party of Austria (FPÖ): 2

=== Twin towns — sister cities ===
Laa an der Thaya is twinned with:

- Garching an der Alz, Germany, since 2003
- Świętochłowice, Poland, since 2004
- Chrlice district of Brno, Czech Republic, since 2005

== Notable people ==
- Paul Löwinger (1904–1988), actor
- Michael Bindlechner (born 1957), director
- Gerd Wimmer (born 1977), footballer
