= Pilszcz =

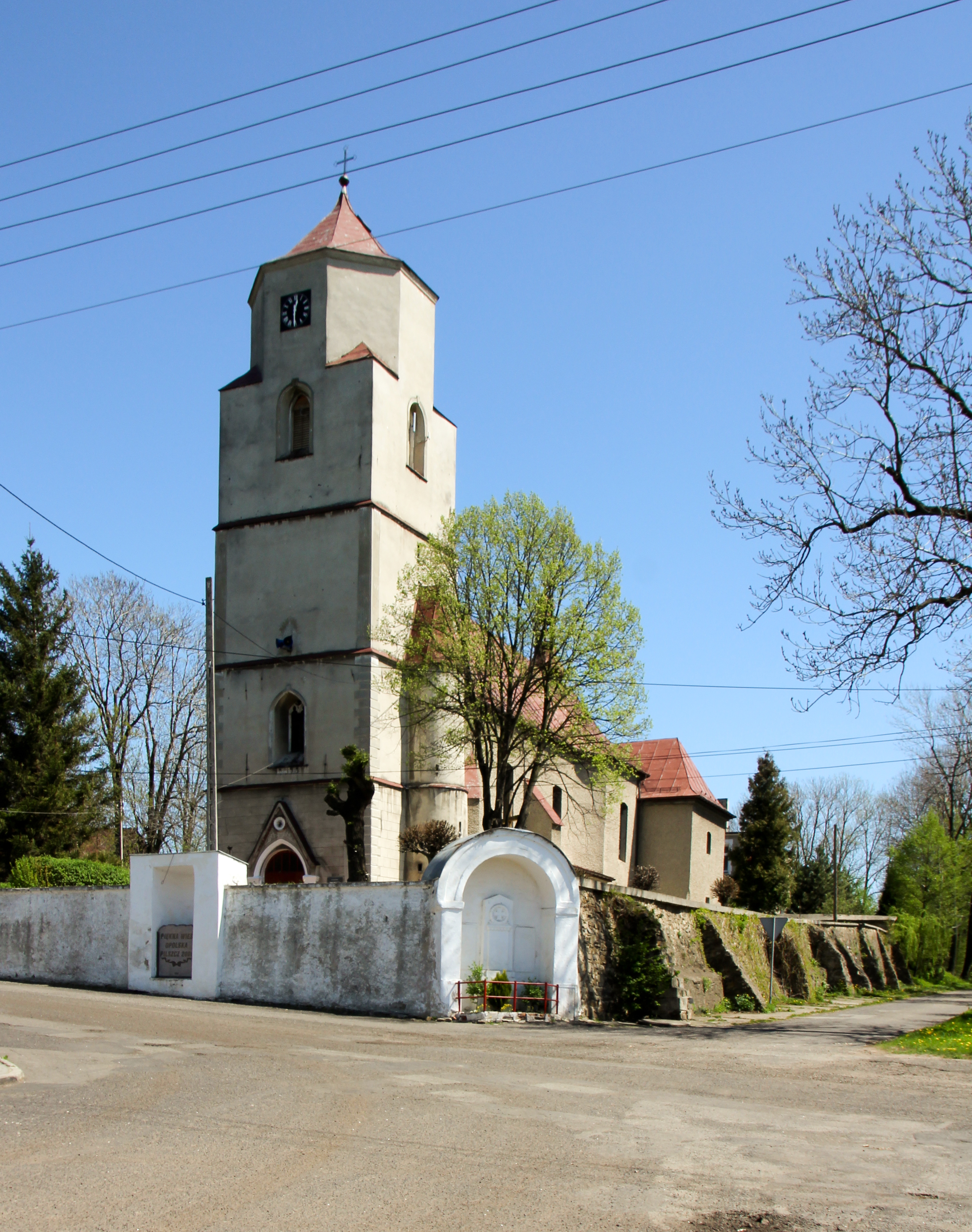
- Church of the Assumption of the Virgin Mary
- Interactive map of Pilszcz
- Location within Poland
- Coordinates: 50°0′0″N 17°55′12″E
- Country: Poland
- Voivodeship: Opole
- County: Głubczyce
- Gmina: Kietrz

Area
  - Total: 1.98 km^{2} (0.76 sq mi)

Population (2007)
  - Total: 755
  - Density: 381/km^{2} (988/sq mi)
- Time zone: UTC+1 (CET)
  - Summer (DST): UTC+2 (CEST)
- Postal code: 48-130
- Area code: +48 77
- Car plates: OGL

Pilszcz [pilʂt͡ʂ] is a village in the administrative district of Gmina Kietrz, within Głubczyce County, Opole Voivodeship, in south-western Poland, close to the Czech border.
