= Mařenice =

- Municipality
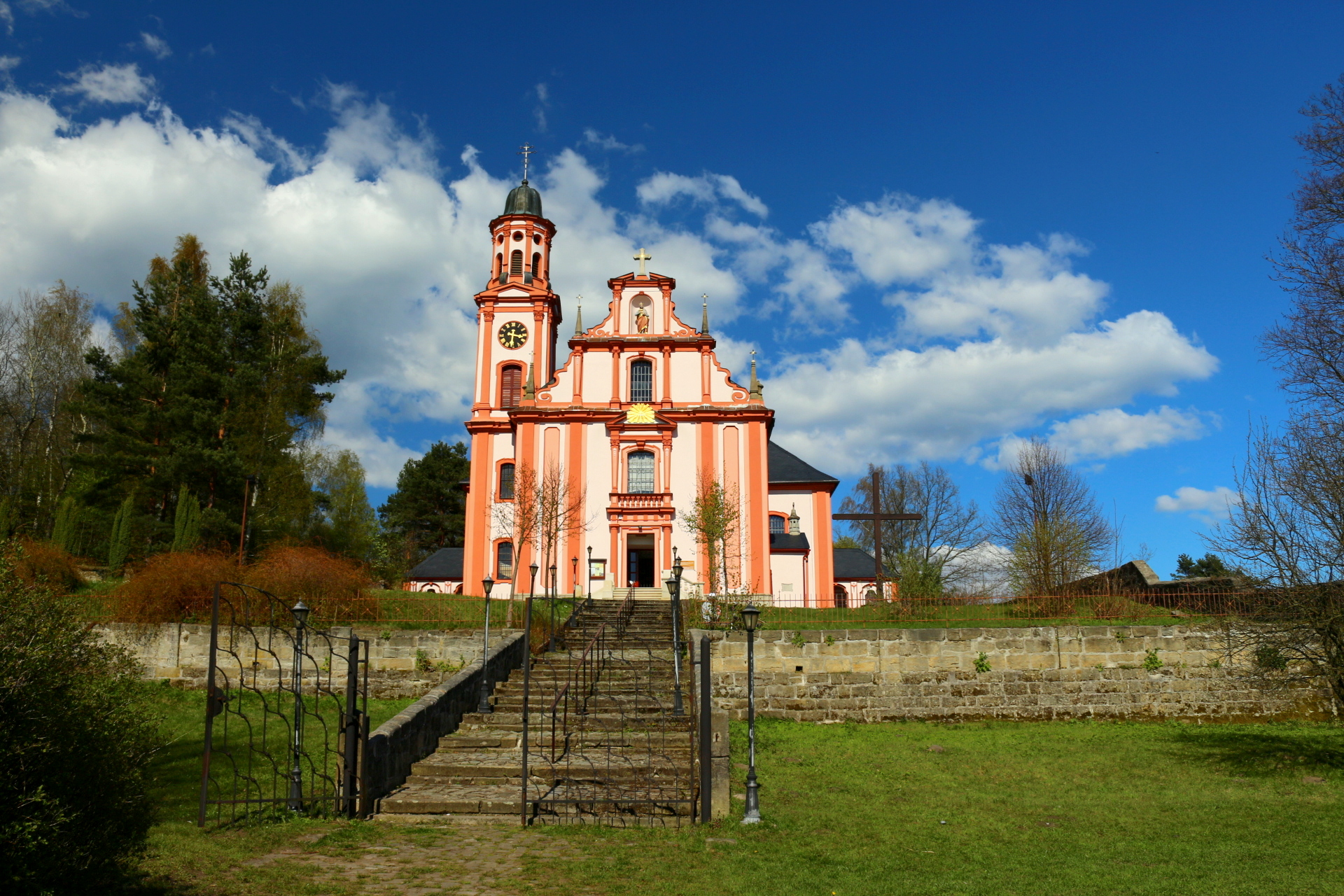
- Church of Saint Mary Magdalene

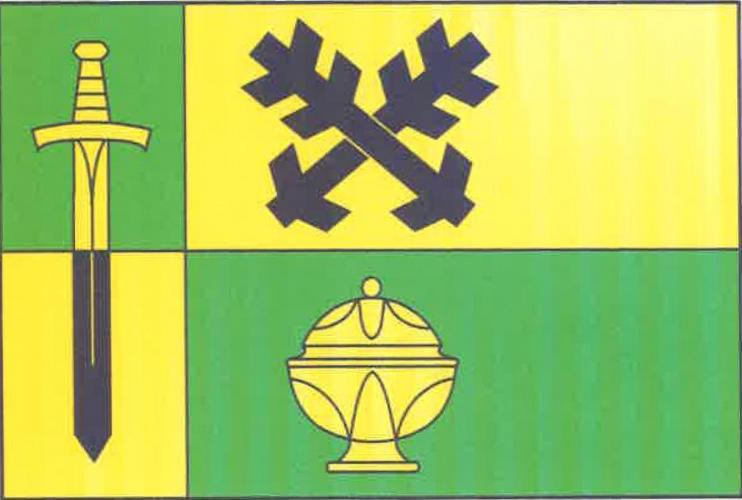
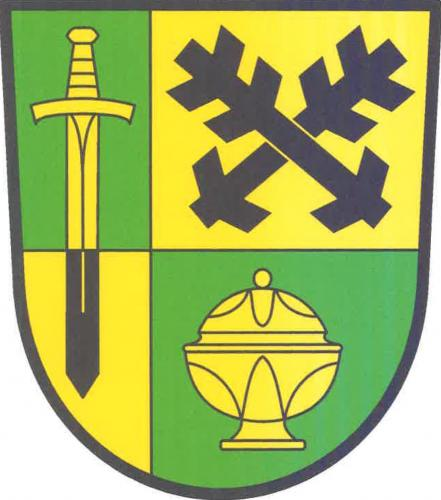
- Flag Coat of arms

- Location in the Czech Republic
- Coordinates: 50°48′27″N 14°40′43″E
- Country: Czech Republic
- Region: Liberec
- District: Česká Lípa
- First mentioned: 1372

Area
  - Total: 26.55 km^{2} (10.25 sq mi)
- Elevation: 392 m (1,286 ft)

Population (2026-01-01)
  - Total: 330
  - Density: 12/km^{2} (32/sq mi)
- Time zone: UTC+1 (CET)
  - Summer (DST): UTC+2 (CEST)
- Postal codes: 471 56, 471 57
- Website: www.obecmarenice.cz

Mařenice (German: Großmergthal) is a municipality and village in Česká Lípa District in the Liberec Region of the Czech Republic. It has about 300 inhabitants.

== Administrative division ==
Mařenice consists of four municipal parts (in brackets population according to the 2021 census):

- Mařenice (187)
- Dolní Světlá (65)
- Horní Světlá (34)
- Mařeničky (36)

== Demographics ==
Historical population
Year	Pop.	±%
1869	3,717	—
1880	3,604	−3.0%
1890	3,292	−8.7%
1900	2,945	−10.5%
1910	2,784	−5.5%
1921	2,334	−16.2%
1930	2,429	+4.1%
1950	492	−79.7%
1961	539	+9.6%
1970	460	−14.7%
1980	390	−15.2%
1991	295	−24.4%
2001	345	+16.9%
2011	317	−8.1%
2021	322	+1.6%
Source: Censuses
