= Sudoměřice =

- Municipality
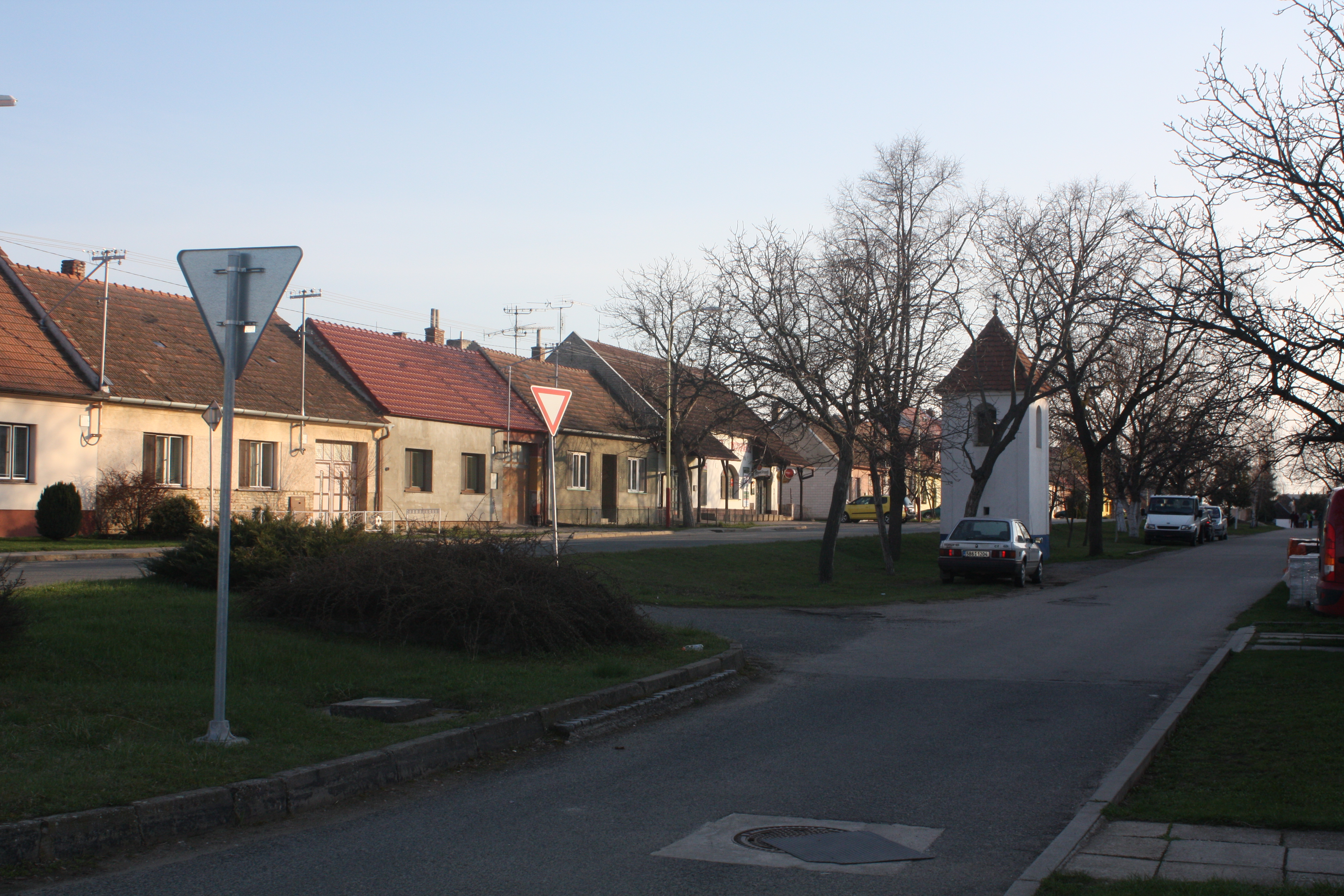
- Main street

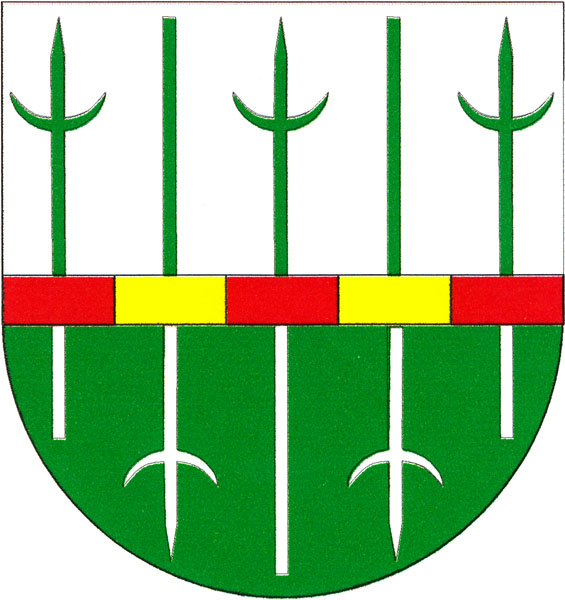
- Flag Coat of arms

- Location in the Czech Republic
- Coordinates: 48°52′2″N 17°15′24″E
- Country: Czech Republic
- Region: South Moravian
- District: Hodonín
- First mentioned: 1368

Area
  - Total: 9.33 km^{2} (3.60 sq mi)
- Elevation: 182 m (597 ft)

Population (2026-01-01)
  - Total: 1,247
  - Density: 134/km^{2} (346/sq mi)
- Time zone: UTC+1 (CET)
  - Summer (DST): UTC+2 (CEST)
- Postal code: 696 66
- Website: www.obecsudomerice.cz

Sudoměřice is a municipality and village in Hodonín District in the South Moravian Region of the Czech Republic. It has about 1,200 inhabitants.

== Etymology ==
The village was named after its founder, Sudomír.

== Geography ==
Sudoměřice is located about 9 kilometres (6 mi) east of Hodonín and 58 km (36 mi) southeast of Brno, on the border with Slovakia. It lies mostly in a flat landscape in the Lower Morava Valley, only the eastern tip of the municipal territory extends into the White Carpathians mountain range. The highest point is at 265 m (869 ft) above sea level.

The Radějovka Stream (here part of the Baťa Canal) flows through the municipality. The stream Sudoměřický potok flows along the Czech–Slovak border (and partly forms the border) until it joins the Radějovka. The eastern half of the municipal territory lies within the Bílé Karpaty Protected Landscape Area.

== History ==
The village was founded probably in 1262 by Sudomír Tvrdišovec, who was the chamberlain of King Ottokar II. The first written mention of Sudoměřice is from 1368, when it was bought by Beneš of Kravaře. The village suffered greatly from the invasions of troops from Hungary, the Thirty Years' War, and the invasions of Turks and Tatars in the second half of the 17th century.

== Demographics ==
Historical population

Year	Pop.	±%
1869	854	—
1880	900	+5.4%
1890	1,026	+14.0%
1900	985	−4.0%
1910	942	−4.4%

Year	Pop.	±%
1921	1,002	+6.4%
1930	1,045	+4.3%
1950	1,207	+15.5%
1961	1,361	+12.8%
1970	1,288	−5.4%

Year	Pop.	±%
1980	1,253	−2.7%
1991	1,200	−4.2%
2001	1,203	+0.2%
2011	1,238	+2.9%
2021	1,199	−3.2%

Source: Censuses

== Economy ==
Sudoměřice is known for viticulture and winemaking. The municipality lies in the Slovácká wine subregion.

== Transport ==
In Sudoměřice is the road border crossing Sudoměřice / Skalica with Slovakia. The I/55 road (the section from Hodonín to Uherské Hradiště) runs through the municipal territory.

Sudoměřice is located on the railway line Hodonín–Javorník, but trains only run on weekends.

== Sights ==
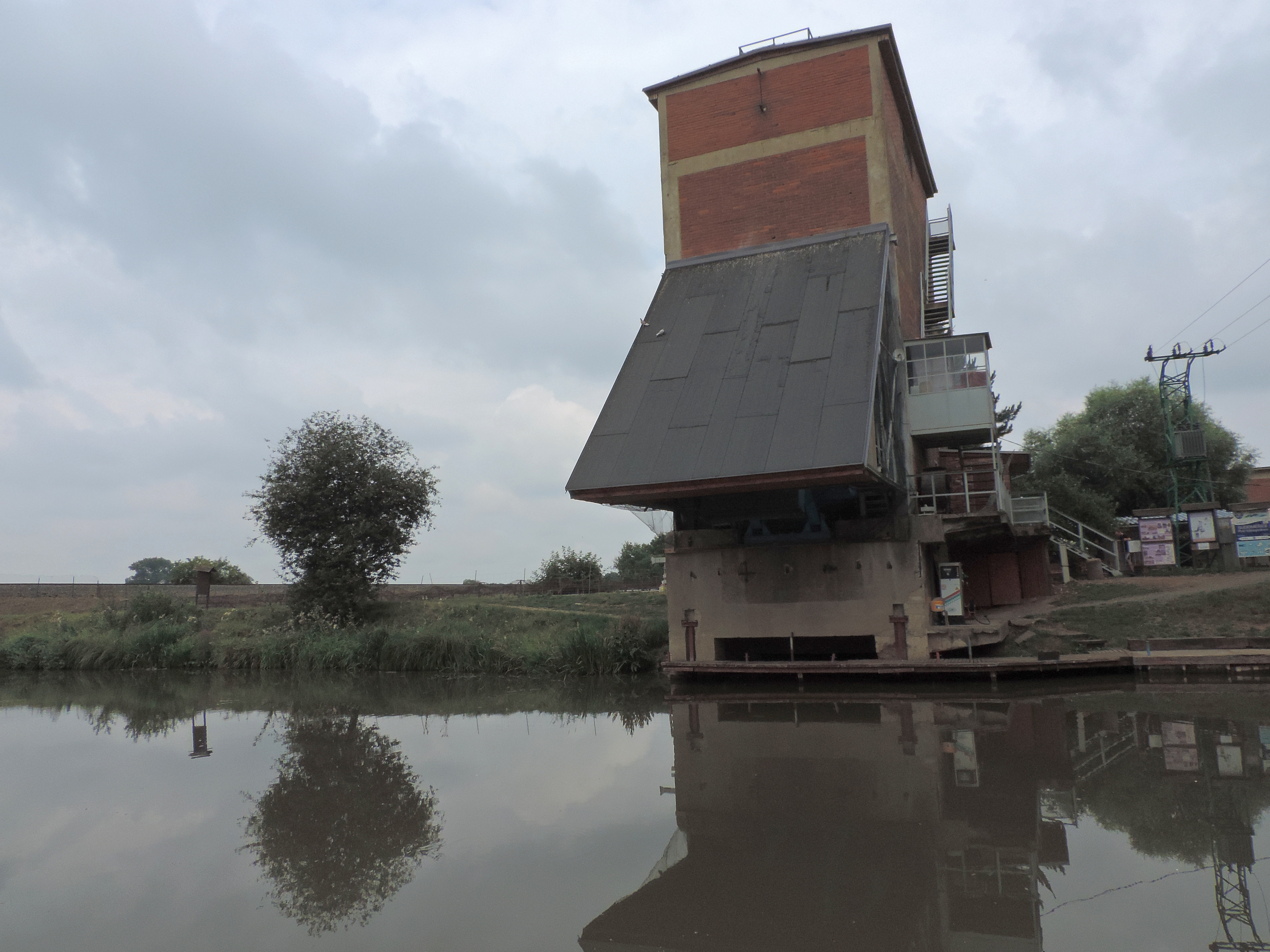
Sudoměřice coal tipper

The main landmark of Sudoměřice is the Church of Christ the King. It was built in 1931–1933.

A technical monument is the Sudoměřice coal tipper. The tipper was used to transfer lignite to ships on the Baťa Canal, which was brought by rail from a nearby mine. It dates from 1939. Today it serves as a lookout tower, and in its interior there is an exhibition about its function.
