= Hevlín =

- Municipality
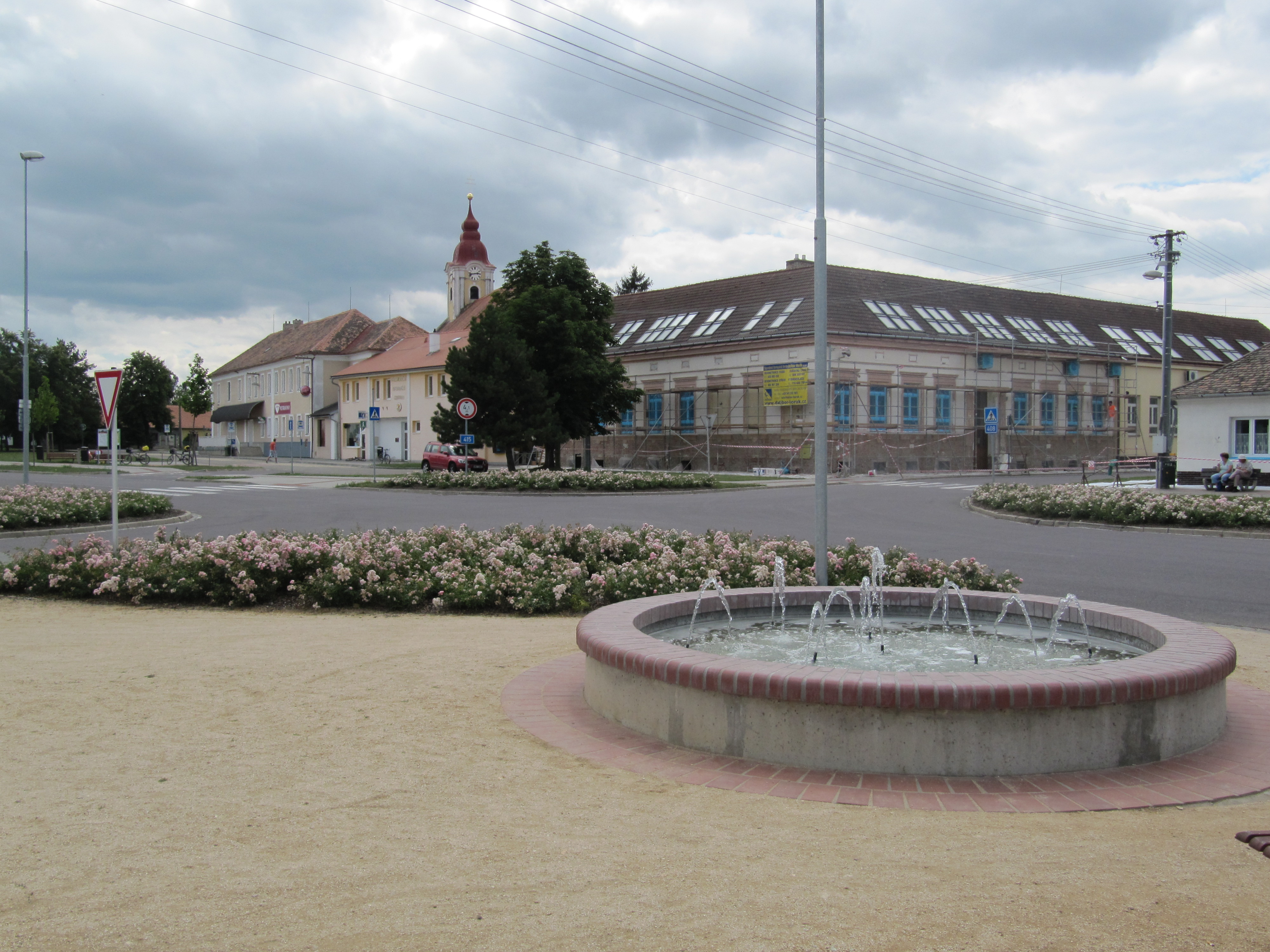
- Centre of Hevlín

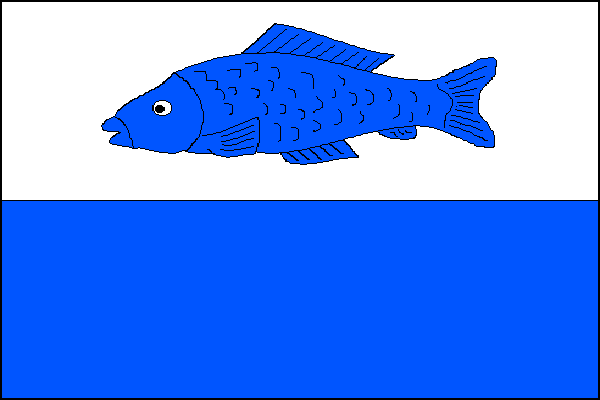
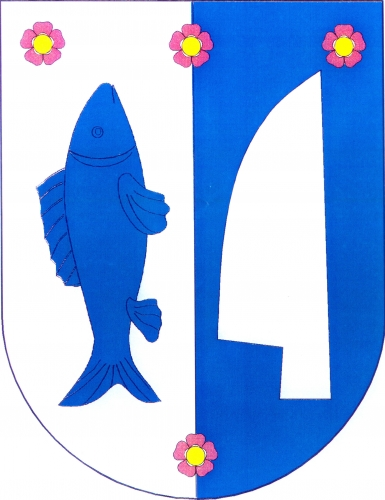
- Flag Coat of arms

- Location in the Czech Republic
- Coordinates: 48°45′8″N 16°22′53″E
- Country: Czech Republic
- Region: South Moravian
- District: Znojmo
- First mentioned: 1282

Area
  - Total: 26.94 km^{2} (10.40 sq mi)
- Elevation: 185 m (607 ft)

Population (2026-01-01)
  - Total: 1,464
  - Density: 54.34/km^{2} (140.7/sq mi)
- Time zone: UTC+1 (CET)
  - Summer (DST): UTC+2 (CEST)
- Postal code: 671 69
- Website: www.hevlin.cz

Hevlín (until 1965 Hevlín nad Dyjí; German: Höflein an der Thaya) is a municipality and village in Znojmo District in the South Moravian Region of the Czech Republic. It has about 1,500 inhabitants.

Hevlín lies approximately 28 kilometres (17 mi) south-east of Znojmo, 53 km (33 mi) south of Brno, and 205 km (127 mi) south-east of Prague.

== Demographics ==
Historical population
Year	Pop.	±%
1869	1,777	—
1880	1,883	+6.0%
1890	1,990	+5.7%
1900	2,006	+0.8%
1910	2,205	+9.9%
1921	2,384	+8.1%
1930	2,423	+1.6%
1950	1,453	−40.0%
1961	1,360	−6.4%
1970	1,404	+3.2%
1980	1,332	−5.1%
1991	1,343	+0.8%
2001	1,342	−0.1%
2011	1,354	+0.9%
2021	1,332	−1.6%
Source: Censuses
