= Kysak railway station =

Railway station in Kysak, Slovakia

Kysak
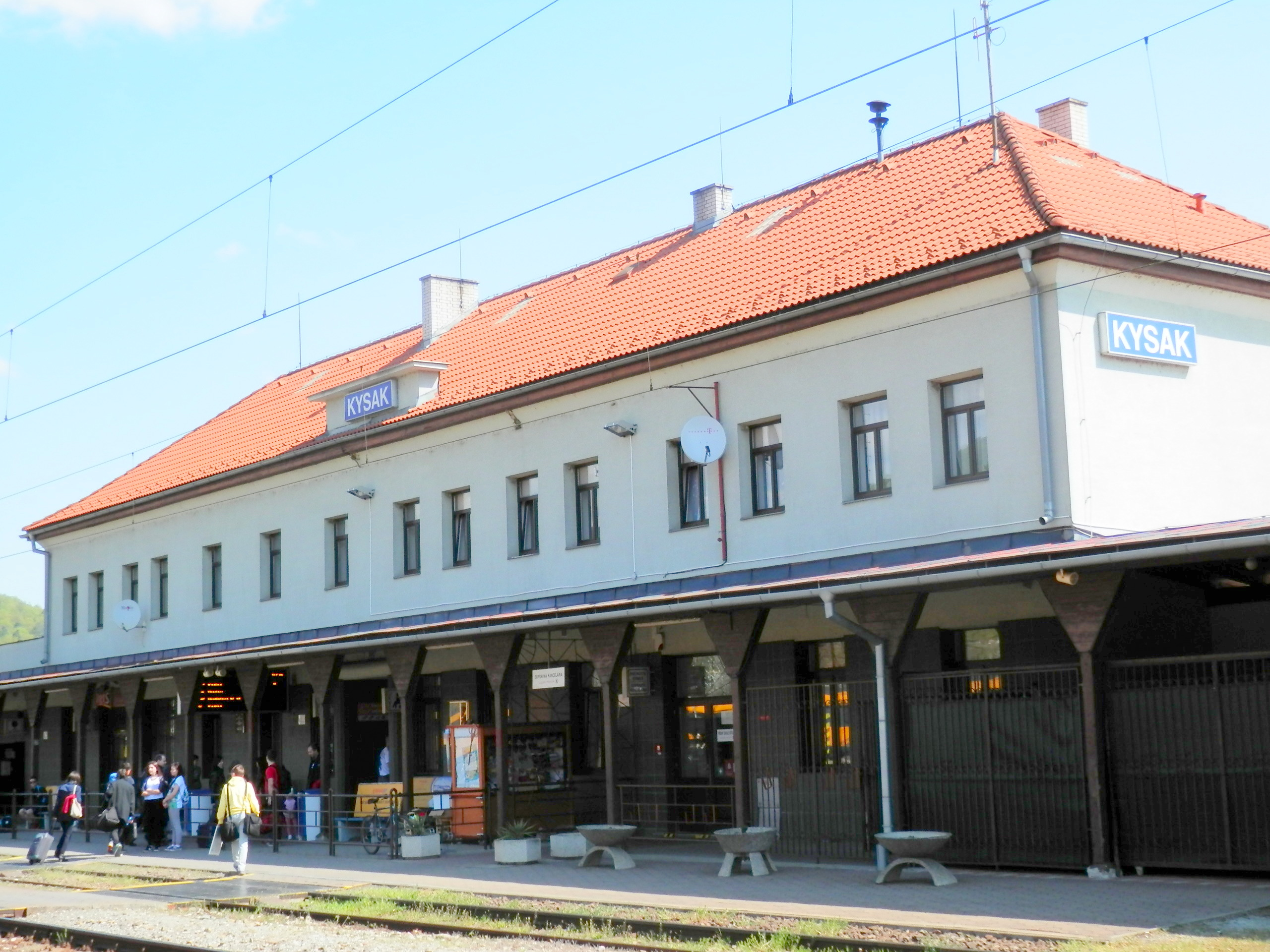
- View of the station yard, 2009

General information
- Location: 04481 Kysak; Kysak; Košice-okolie; Košice Region; Slovakia
- Coordinates: 48°51′10″N 21°13′26″E
- Elevation: 298 m (978 ft)
- Owner: Železnice Slovenskej republiky
- Operator: Železnice Slovenskej republiky
- Lines: Košice–Žilina (Košice)–Plaveč–Čirč–Muszyna (PKP)
- Distance: 114.434 km (71.106 mi) from Slovakia—Ukraine border
- Connections: Local buses

History
- Opened: 1 September 1870
Location
- Location within Slovakia

Kysak railway station (Slovak: Železničná stanica Kysak) serves the village and municipality of Kysak, in the Košice Region, eastern Slovakia. Opened in 1870, the station is an important railway junction, where the Košice–Plaveč–Čirč–Muszyna railway diverges towards Poland from the Košice–Žilina railway, which is part of Slovakia's main east–west rail corridor.

The station is currently owned by Železnice Slovenskej republiky (ŽSR); train services are operated by Železničná spoločnosť Slovensko (ZSSK).

== Location ==
Kysak railway station is situated at the eastern edge of the village.

== History ==
The station was opened on 1 September 1870, upon the inauguration of the Košice–Prešov section of the Košice–Plaveč–Čirč–Muszyna railway.

It became a junction station soon afterwards, on 12 March 1872, when the section of the Košice–Bohumín Railway between Spišská Nová Ves and Kysak was completed.

== Facilities ==
The two storey station building houses information and ticketing facilities.

The station yard has six tracks equipped with platforms for passenger services and four tracks for freight workings.

== Train services ==
Kysak railway station is the junction of the following Slovakian railway lines:

- 180 Košice–Žilina (part of the Košice–Bohumín Railway)
- 188 Košice–Plaveč–Čirč–Muszyna (PKP)

Line 180 forms part of Pan-European Corridor Va, which runs from Venice in Italy to Kyiv in Ukraine, via Bratislava, Žilina, Košice and Uzhhorod.

Passenger train traffic is made up of local trains and long-distance services to and from Poland, the Czech Republic and Hungary.

== Interchange ==
The station offers interchange with local buses.

== Services ==
Preceding station	ŽSSK	Following station
Spišská Nová Ves toward Prague	EuroNight; EN Slovakia	Košice; Terminus
Poprad-Tatry toward Bratislava	InterCity	Košice; Terminus
Margecany toward Žilina	Regional fast trains	Košice toward Humenné
Prešov; Terminus	Regional fast trains	Košice toward Zvolen
Veľká Lodina toward Gelnica or Poprad-Tatry	Stopping trains	Trebejov toward Košice
Obišovce toward Prešov	Stopping trains	Trebejov toward Košice

== See also ==
- History of rail transport in Slovakia
- Rail transport in Slovakia
