= Spišská Nová Ves railway station =

Railway station in Spišská Nová Ves, Slovakia

Spišská Nová Ves
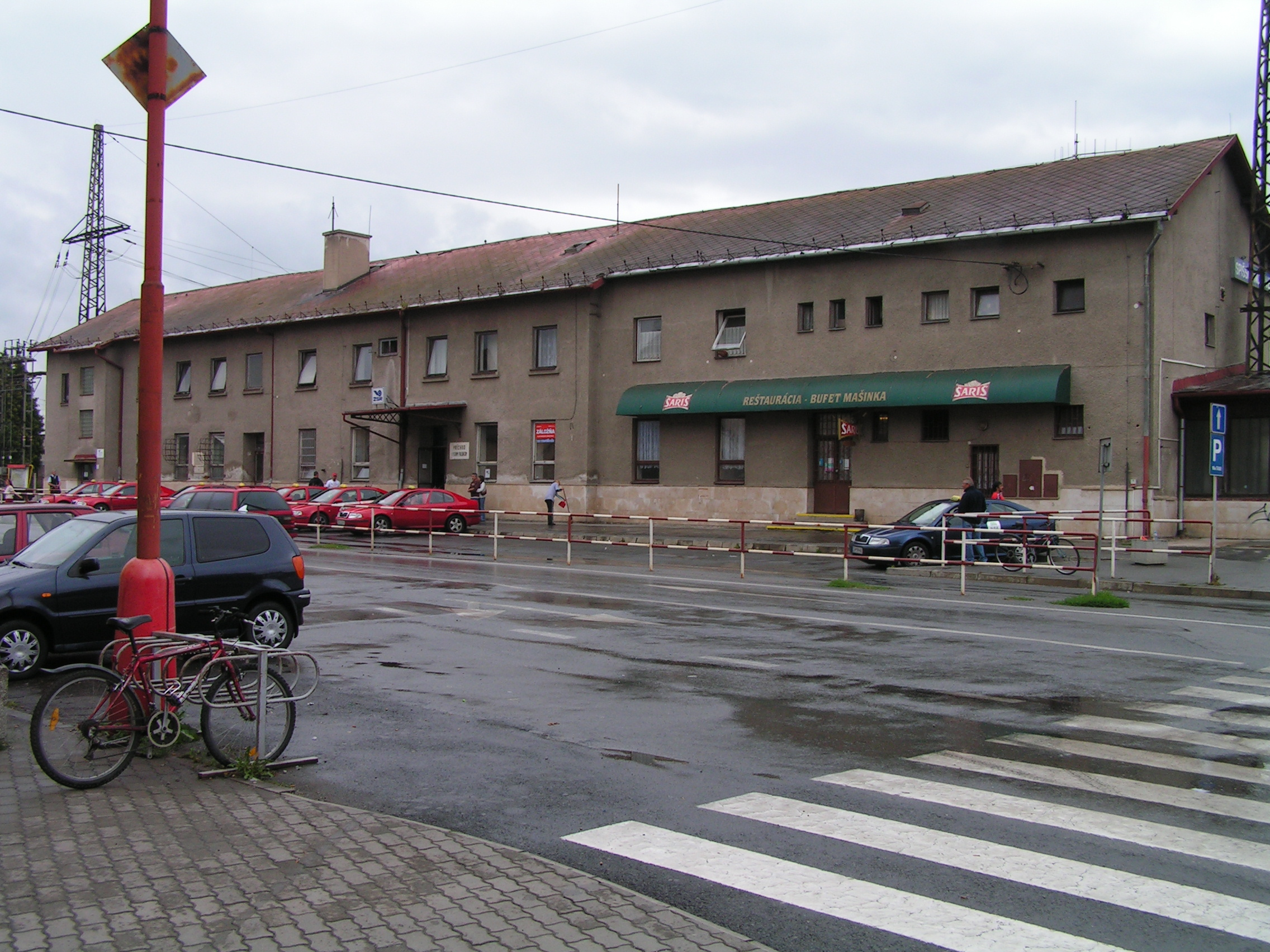
- The station building viewed from the street, 2008

General information
- Location: J. Fabiniho; 05201 Spišská Nová Ves; Spišská Nová Ves; Spišská Nová Ves; Košice Region; Slovakia
- Coordinates: 48°57′01″N 20°33′40″E
- Owner: Železnice Slovenskej republiky
- Operator: Železnice Slovenskej republiky
- Lines: Košice–Žilina; Spišská Nová Ves–Levoča
- Distance: 173.290 km (107.677 mi) from Slovakia—Ukraine border
- Connections: Local buses

History
- Opened: 12 December 1871
Location
- Location within Slovakia

Spišská Nová Ves railway station (Slovak: Železničná stanica Spišská Nová Ves) serves the town and municipality of Spišská Nová Ves, in the Košice Region, eastern Slovakia.

Opened in 1871, the station is a junction between the Košice–Žilina railway, which is part of Slovakia's main east–west rail corridor, and a 12 km (7.5 mi) spur line to Levoča.

The station is currently owned by Železnice Slovenskej republiky (ŽSR); train services are operated by Železničná spoločnosť Slovensko (ZSSK).

== Location ==
Spišská Nová Ves railway station is situated at J. Fabiniho, northwest of the town centre.

== History ==
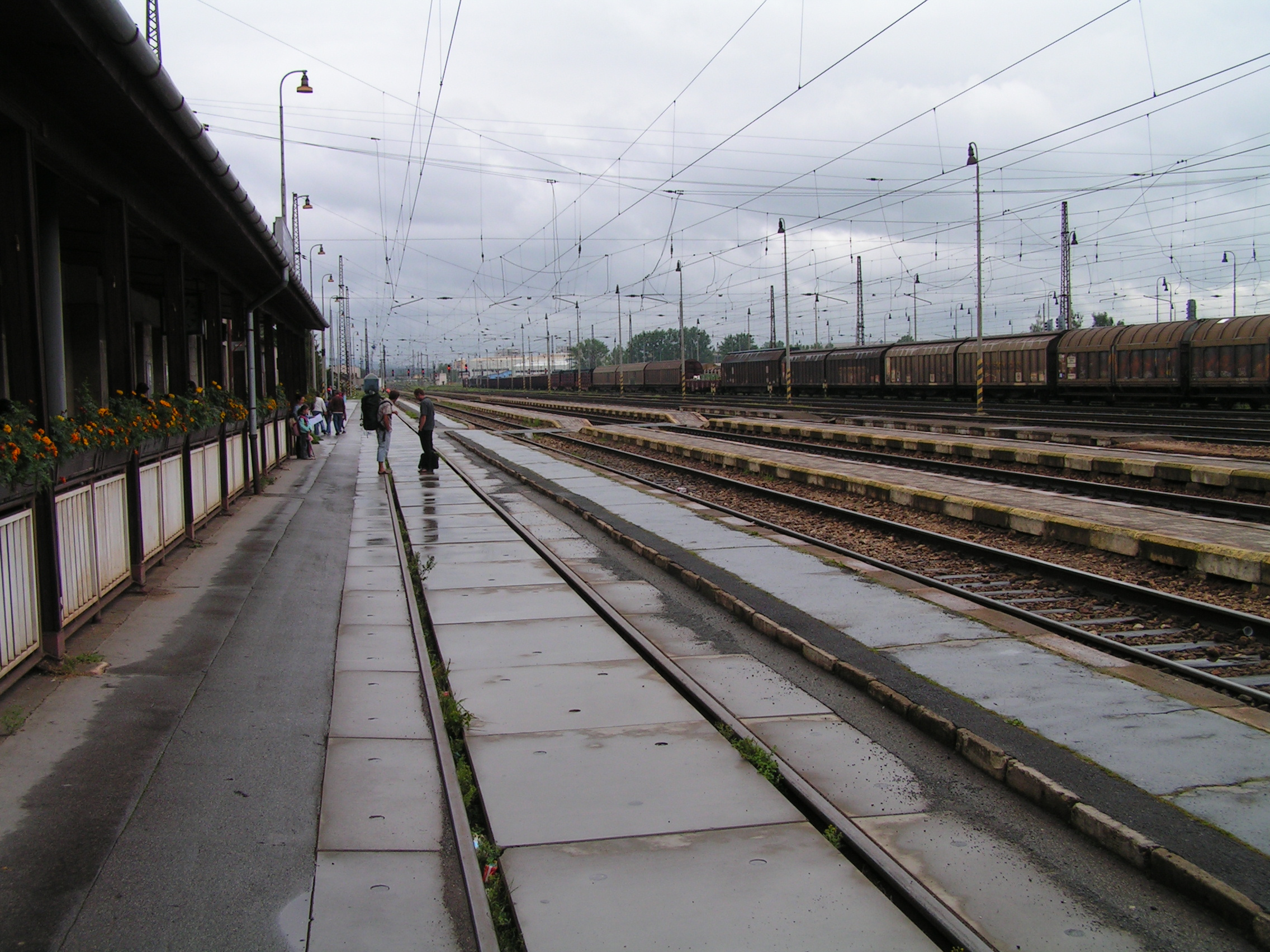
The station yard, 2008.

The station was opened on 12 December 1871, upon the inauguration of the Poprad–Spišská Nová Ves section of the Košice–Bohumín Railway.

Soon afterwards, on 12 March 1872, the next section of that railway was completed, between Spišská Nová Ves and Kysak.

The spur line to Levoča was opened on 8 November 1892.

Regular passenger services on the spur line were suspended in February 2003, despite protests from residents and local officials, especially in Levoča. Only a handful of Marian pilgrim trains have operated as passenger trains on the line since then, but freight traffic has continued.

On 1 April 2010, a locomotive ran into a stationary passenger train at the station after its brakes failed during a test ride, killing three people and seriously injuring eight others.

== Facilities ==
The double storey station building houses information and ticketing facilities, and a restaurant.

The station yard has tracks equipped with low level platforms for passenger services and tracks for freight workings.

== Train services ==
Spišská Nová Ves railway station is the junction of the following Slovakian railway lines:

- 180 Košice–Žilina (part of the Košice–Bohumín Railway)
- 186 Spišská Nová Ves–Levoča

Line 180 forms part of Pan-European Corridor Va, which runs from Venice in Italy to Kyiv in Ukraine, via Bratislava, Žilina, Košice and Uzhhorod.

== Interchange ==
The station provides interchange with local buses.

== Services ==
Preceding station	ŽSSK	Following station
Poprad-Tatry toward Prague	EuroNight; EN Slovakia	Kysak toward Košice
Poprad-Tatry toward Žilina	Regional fast trains	Margecany toward Humenné
Smižany toward Poprad-Tatry	Stopping trains	Teplička nad Hornádom toward Košice

== See also ==
- History of rail transport in Slovakia
- Rail transport in Slovakia
