= Poprad-Tatry railway station =

Railway station in Slovakia

Poprad-Tatry
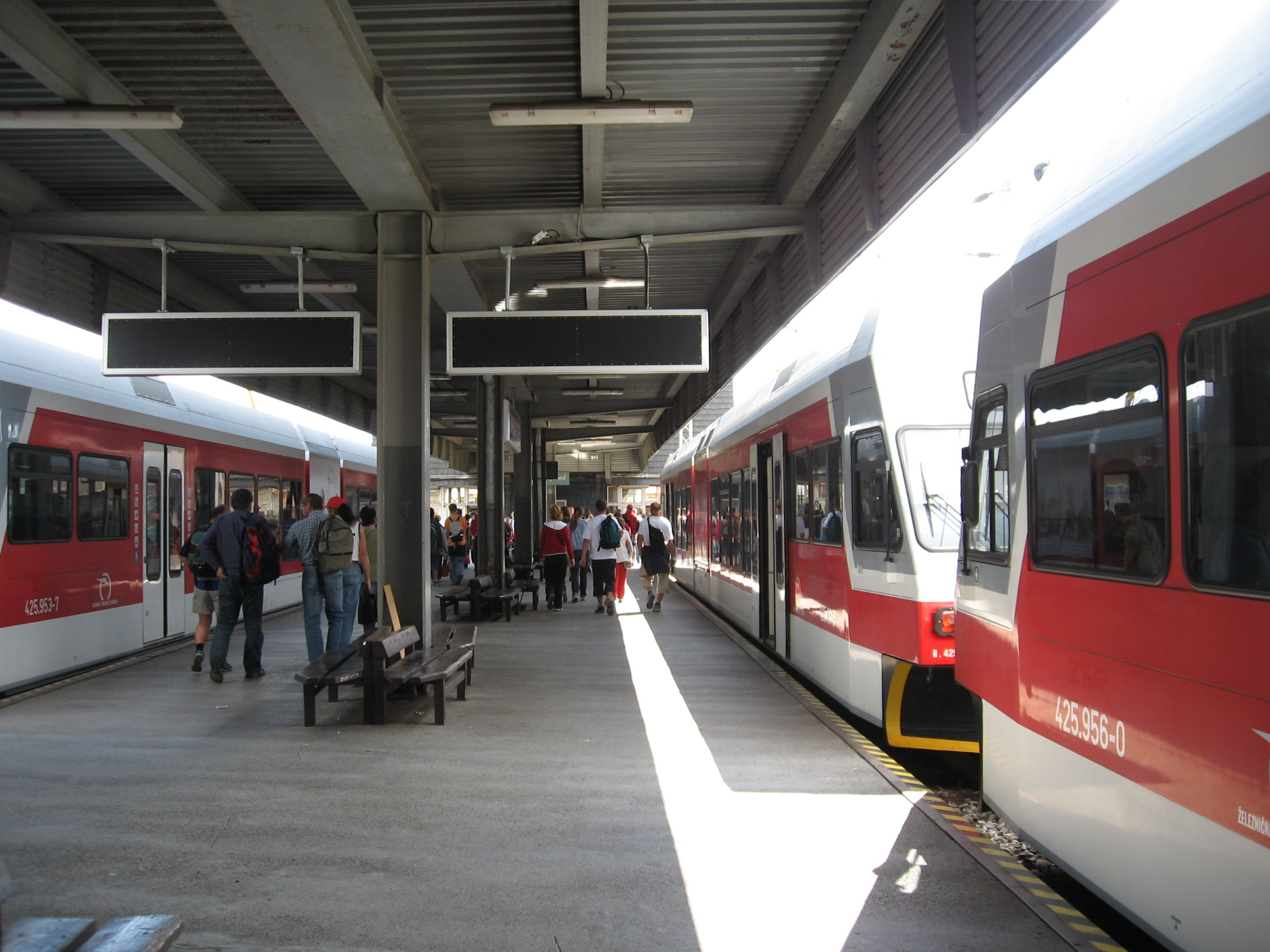

General information
- Location: Jiřího Wolkera; 05801 Poprad; Prešov Region; Slovakia
- Coordinates: 49°03′35″N 20°17′47″E
- Elevation: 670 m (2,200 ft)
- Owner: Železnice Slovenskej republiky (ŽSR)
- Operator: Železnice Slovenskej republiky
- Lines: Košice–Bohumín; 185 Poprad-Tatry–Plaveč; 183 Tatra Electric Railway
- Distance: 199.39 km (123.90 mi) from Slovakia–Ukraine border
- Platforms: 4
- Connections: Local buses

History
- Opened: 8 December 1871
Location
- Location within Slovakia

Poprad-Tatry railway station (Slovak: Železničná stanica Poprad-Tatry) is a break-of-gauge junction station serving the city of Poprad, in the Prešov Region, northeastern Slovakia.

Opened in 1871, the station forms part of the standard gauge Košice–Bohumín Railway, and is the junction between that line and the Poprad-Tatry–Plaveč railway, a standard gauge branch line. Poprad-Tatry is also the southern terminus of the metre gauge Tatra Electric Railway, and, as such, is a gateway to the High Tatras mountain range, a popular tourist destination.

The station is currently owned by Železnice Slovenskej republiky (ŽSR); train services are operated by Železničná spoločnosť Slovensko (ZSSK).

== Location ==
Poprad-Tatry railway station is situated at Jiřího Wolkera, at the north western edge of the town centre.

== History ==
The station was opened on 8 December 1871, together with the rest of the Žilina–Poprad section of the Košice–Bohumín Railway. Only four days later, upon the inauguration of the section to Spišská Nová Ves, it became a through station.

With the commissioning of the first part of the Poprad-Tatry–Plaveč railway in 1889, the station was transformed into a junction.

The metre gauge connection with the High Tatras was achieved on 20 December 1908, via Starý Smokovec.

On 25 March 1942, the first deportation of Slovak Jews left Poprad station for the Auschwitz death camp. The train that departed that day was carrying about 1,000 Jewish girls and young women. Most of the subsequent transports of Slovak Jews similarly departed from Poprad. By the end of 1942, when the transports were halted, over 58,000 Jews had been deported from Slovakia to Poland.

Following a renovation in the 1980s, the station reached its present form as a two level interchange station. An SKK 858 million modernization and extension of the 1980s renovations was carried out in 2006–2007.

== Train services ==
Poprad-Tatry railway station is the junction of the following Slovak railway lines:

- 180 Košice–Žilina (part of the Košice–Bohumín Railway)
- 183 Poprad-Tatry–Starý Smokovec–Štrbské Pleso (part of the Tatra Electric Railway)
- 185 Poprad-Tatry–Plaveč

Line 180 forms part of Pan-European Corridor Va, which runs from Venice in Italy to Kyiv in Ukraine, via Bratislava, Žilina, Košice and Uzhhorod.

== Interchange ==
The station offers interchange with local buses.

== Services ==
Preceding station	ZSSK	Following station
Liptovský Mikuláš toward Prague	EuroNight; EN Slovakia	Spišská Nová Ves toward Košice
Liptovský Mikuláš toward Bratislava	InterCity	Kysak; Košice
Štrba toward Žilina	Regional fast trains	Spišská Nová Ves toward Humenné
Svit toward Žilina	Stopping trains	Gánovce toward Košice
Terminus	Stopping trains	Matejovce pri Poprade toward Tatranská Lomnica
Terminus	Stopping trains	Matejovce pri Poprade toward Stará Ľubovňa
Veľký Slavkov toward Štrbské Pleso	Stopping trains Tatra Electric Railway	Terminus

== See also ==
- History of rail transport in Slovakia
- Rail transport in Slovakia
