= Poprad =

City in Slovakia

- City
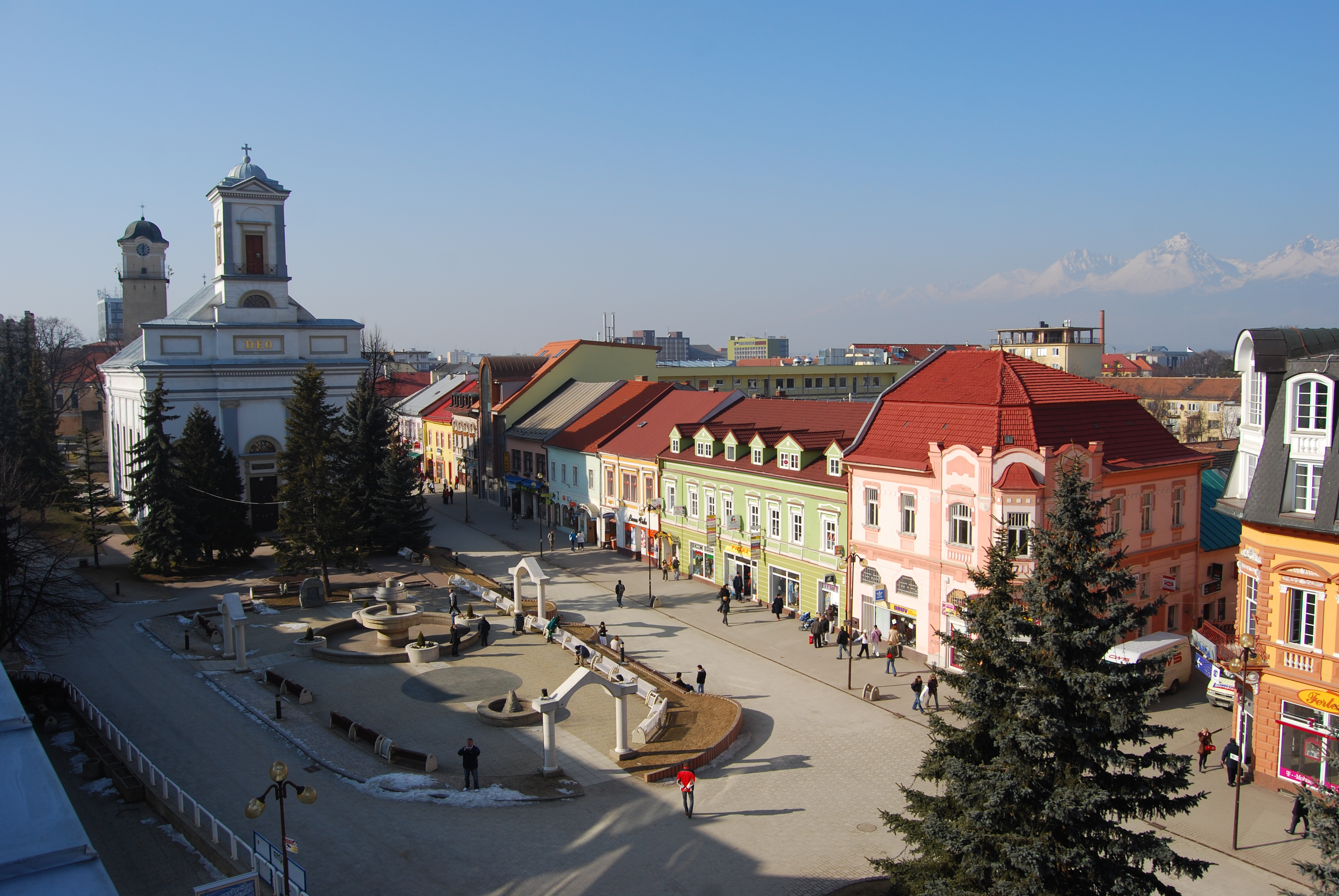
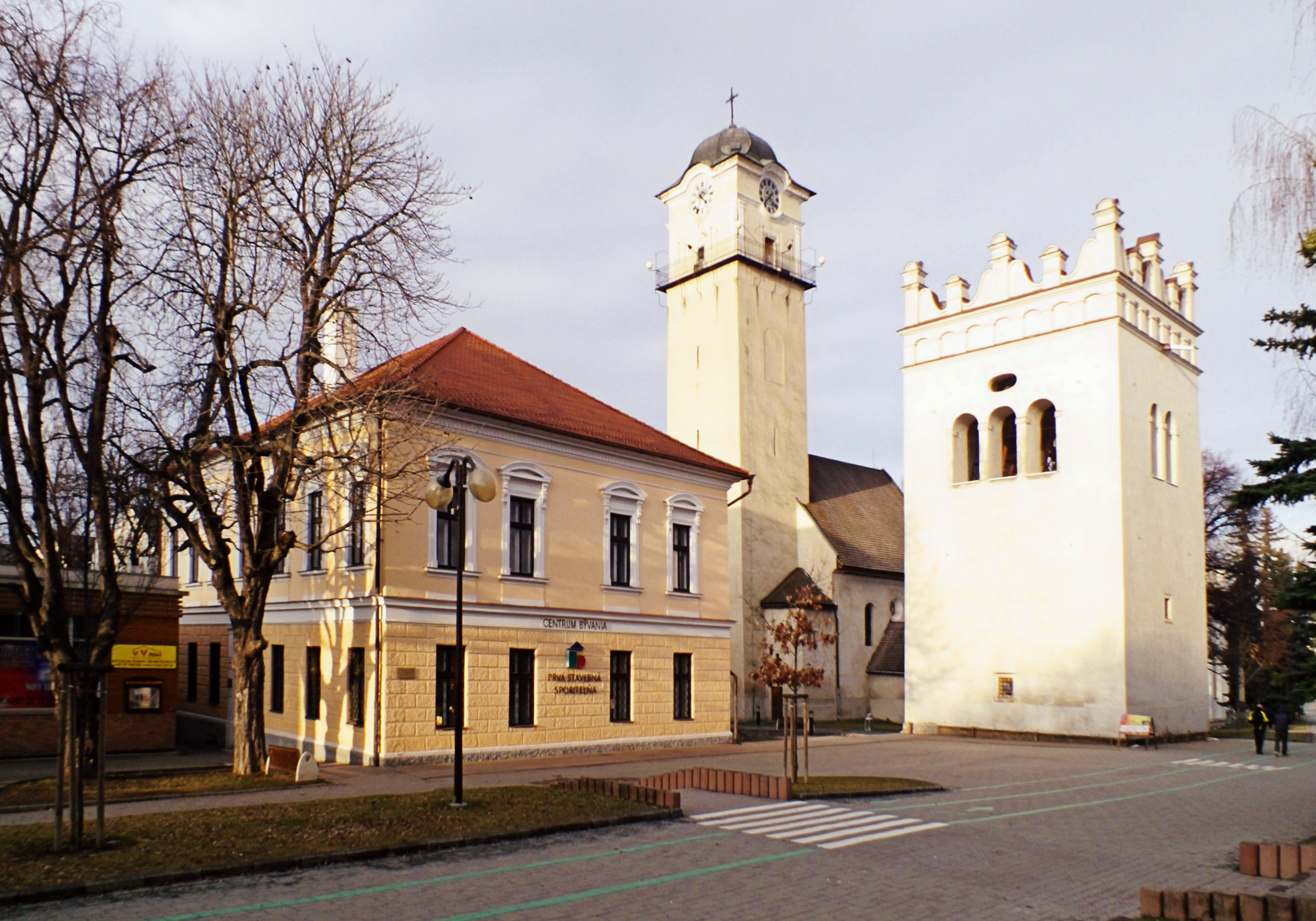
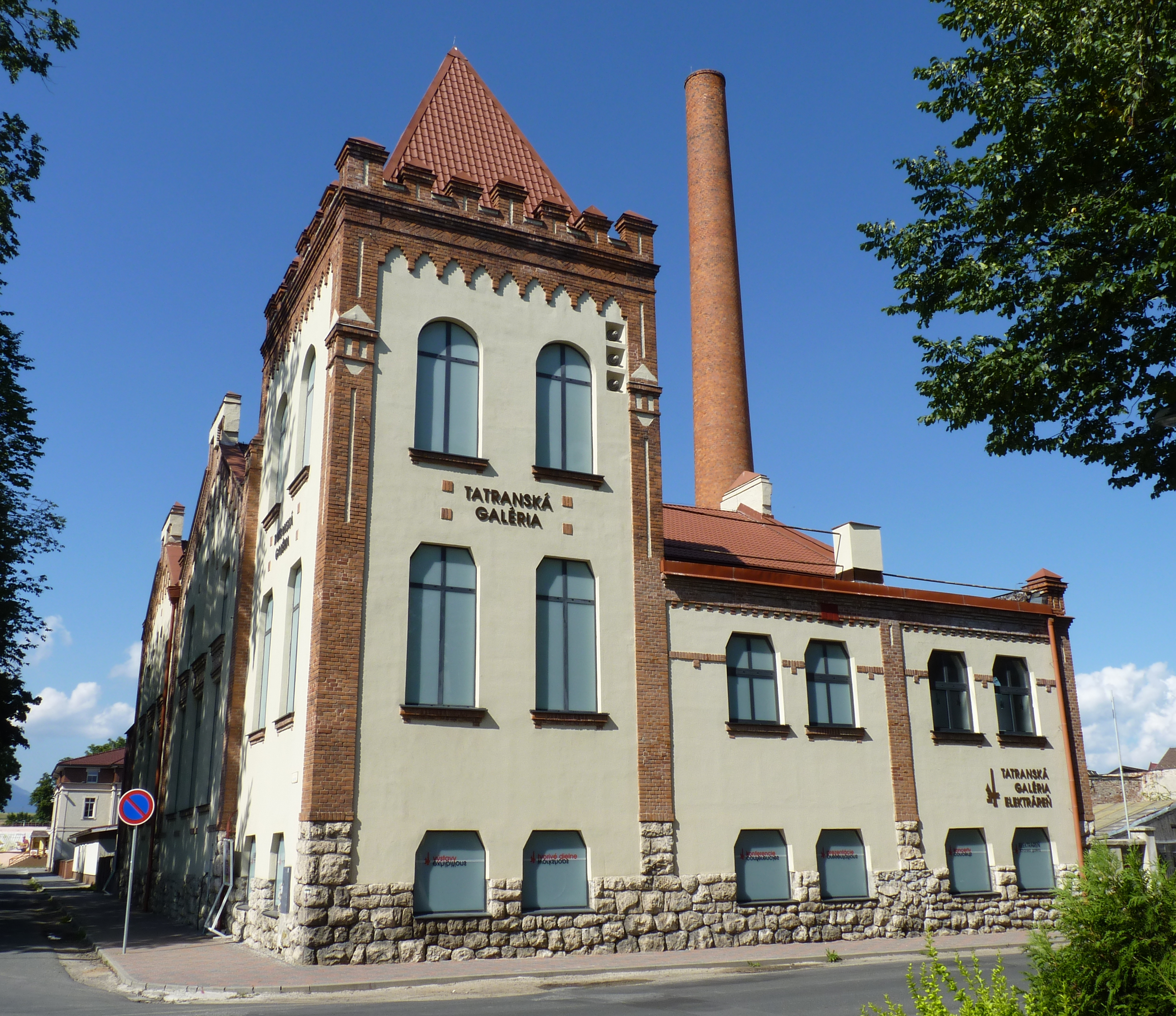
- From the top, Central Poprad, Renaissance bell tower, Tatra Gallery Central Poprad

- Flag Coat of arms

- Location in Slovakia Poprad (Slovakia)
- Coordinates: 49°03′34″N 20°17′51″E
- Country: Slovakia
- Region: Prešov Region
- District: Poprad District
- First mentioned: 1250

Government
  - Mayor: Anton Danko

Area
  - Total: 63.05 km^{2} (24.34 sq mi)
- (2022)
- Elevation: 684 m (2,244 ft)

Population (2025)
  - Total: 48,034
- Time zone: UTC+1 (CET)
  - Summer (DST): UTC+2 (CEST)
- Postal code: 058 01
- Area code: +421 52
- Vehicle registration plate (until 2022): PP
- Website: poprad.sk

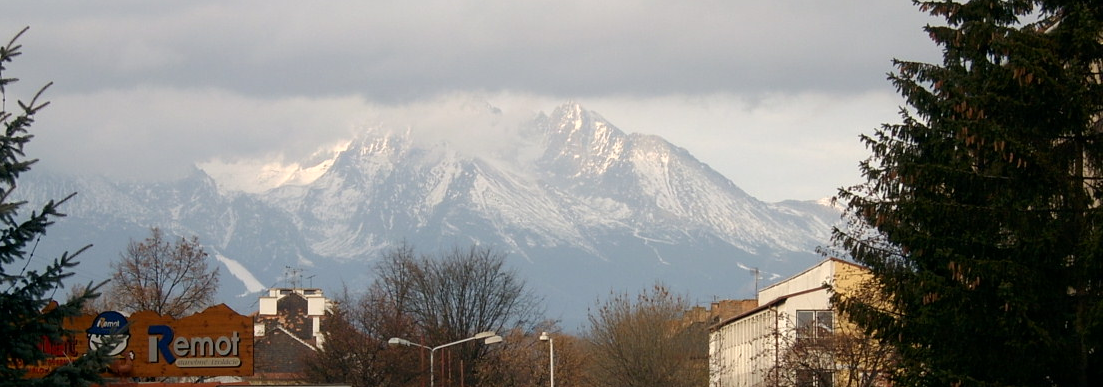
View of the High Tatras from Poprad

Poprad (Slovak: [ˈpɔprat]; Hungarian: Poprád; German: Deutschendorf) is a city in northern Slovakia at the foot of the High Tatra Mountains, famous for its picturesque historic centre and as a holiday resort. The largest town of the Spiš region and the largest of all towns in the vicinity of the High Tatra Mountains in both Slovakia and Poland, Poprad is the tenth largest city in Slovakia, with a population of approximately 50,000.

The Poprad-Tatry Airport is an international airport located just outside the city. Poprad is also the starting point of the Tatra Electric Railway (Slovak: Tatranská elektrická železnica), a set of special narrow-gauge trains (trams) connecting the resorts in the High Tatras with each other and with Poprad. Mainline trains link Poprad to other destinations in Slovakia and beyond; in particular, there are through trains running from Poprad to Prague in the Czech Republic.

== History ==
Historical affiliations

Kingdom of Hungary 1256–1412
Kingdom of Poland 1412–1569
Polish–Lithuanian Commonwealth 1569–1769
(Austrian Empire) Kingdom of Hungary 1769–1867
Austria-Hungary 1867–1918
Czechoslovakia 1918–1939
Slovak Republic 1939–1945
Czechoslovakia 1945–1990
Czech and Slovak Federative Republic 1990–1992
Slovak Republic 1993–present

The territory was inhabited by Slavic settlers since the Migration Period. The first written record dates from 16 March 1256 in the deed of donation of the Hungarian King Bela IV. After the Mongol invasions in the 13th century it was colonized by German settlers and became the largely German town Deutschendorf meaning 'Germans' village'. From 1412 to 1770, as one of the Spis towns, Poprad was pawned by the Kingdom of Hungary to the Kingdom of Poland, resulting in a strong Polish influence on the city's further development. In the 17th century, the number of Germans began to decline. Since 1918, this territory has been placed under the control of Czechoslovakia.

Poprad itself was for 690 years (up until 1946) just one of several neighbouring settlements, which currently make up the modern city. The other parts of the current municipality are Matejovce (German: Matzdorf; Hungarian: Mateóc, first reference 1251), Spišská Sobota (German: Georgenberg; Hungarian: Szepesszombat, 1256), Veľká (German/Hungarian: Felka, 1268), and Stráže pod Tatrami (German: Michelsdorf; Hungarian: Strázsa, 1276). The most significant of these original towns was Georgenberg, now Spišská Sobota, which preserved its dominant position in the area until the late 19th century.

Poprad gained importance at the expense of Spišská Sobota after the construction of the Košice–Bohumín Railway in 1871. In the following years, further railway lines were built: Poprad - Kežmarok in 1892 and Tatra Electric Railway in 1908.

In 1942, during World War II, most of the transports of Jews to ghettos and concentration camps in German-occupied Poland were sent from the Poprad railway station. The first transport of about 1,000 Jewish girls and young women left Poprad on 25 March 1942 for Auschwitz-Birkenau. By the end of 1942, when the deportations stopped, over 58,000 Jews had been deported from Slovakia to German-occupied Poland via Poprad.

Poprad was liberated on 28 January 1945 by troops of the Soviet 18th Army. The German population was expelled afterwards.

After the war, the neighbouring settlements were incorporated into Poprad: Spišská Sobota and Veľká in 1945, Stráže pod Tatry in 1960 and Matejovce in 1974. At that time, with the development of winter sports, Poprad became the starting point for expeditions to the High Tatras.

In 1999, Poprad put in a bid to host the 2006 Winter Olympics, but lost to Turin, Italy.

== Geography ==
The municipality lies at an altitude of 684 metres (2,244 ft) and covers an area of 63.05 km^{2} (24.34 sq mi) (2025). It is located in northeastern Slovakia, about 110 kilometres (68 mi) from Košice and 330 kilometres (205 mi) from Bratislava (by road).

Poprad is situated on the Poprad River in the Sub-Tatra Basin, and is a gateway to the High Tatras. Mountain ranges around the city include the Levoča Hills in the east, Kozie chrbty in the south, and the Low Tatras in the southwest. The drainage divide between the Black Sea and Baltic Sea lies a bit to the west, near the village of Štrba.

=== Climate ===
Poprad lies in the north temperate zone and has a humid continental climate (Köppen Dfb) with four distinct seasons. It is characterized by a significant variation between warm summers and cold winters.

Climate data for Poprad (1991–2020, extremes 1926–present)
Month	Jan	Feb	Mar	Apr	May	Jun	Jul	Aug	Sep	Oct	Nov	Dec	Year
Record high °C (°F)	12.3 (54.1)	18.2 (64.8)	22.3 (72.1)	27.0 (80.6)	31.2 (88.2)	33.8 (92.8)	34.8 (94.6)	34.8 (94.6)	31.5 (88.7)	29.2 (84.6)	20.5 (68.9)	16.3 (61.3)	34.8 (94.6)
Mean daily maximum °C (°F)	0.5 (32.9)	2.7 (36.9)	7.1 (44.8)	13.5 (56.3)	18.1 (64.6)	21.7 (71.1)	23.4 (74.1)	23.7 (74.7)	18.3 (64.9)	12.9 (55.2)	6.6 (43.9)	1.2 (34.2)	12.5 (54.5)
Daily mean °C (°F)	−3.7 (25.3)	−2.3 (27.9)	1.4 (34.5)	7.2 (45.0)	12.0 (53.6)	15.6 (60.1)	17.0 (62.6)	16.6 (61.9)	11.7 (53.1)	7.0 (44.6)	2.2 (36.0)	−2.6 (27.3)	6.8 (44.2)
Mean daily minimum °C (°F)	−8.0 (17.6)	−6.9 (19.6)	−3.3 (26.1)	1.2 (34.2)	5.9 (42.6)	9.3 (48.7)	10.9 (51.6)	10.5 (50.9)	6.4 (43.5)	2.2 (36.0)	−1.6 (29.1)	−6.5 (20.3)	1.7 (35.1)
Record low °C (°F)	−29.1 (−20.4)	−33.1 (−27.6)	−26.7 (−16.1)	−12.8 (9.0)	−6.6 (20.1)	−2.9 (26.8)	0.4 (32.7)	0.1 (32.2)	−6.6 (20.1)	−13.2 (8.2)	−19.5 (−3.1)	−30.5 (−22.9)	−33.1 (−27.6)
Average precipitation mm (inches)	25.0 (0.98)	27.4 (1.08)	30.3 (1.19)	43.2 (1.70)	75.5 (2.97)	84.0 (3.31)	101.5 (4.00)	79.2 (3.12)	56.0 (2.20)	51.1 (2.01)	36.6 (1.44)	26.9 (1.06)	636.6 (25.06)
Average precipitation days (≥ 1.0 mm)	6.2	6.6	6.8	7.6	10.4	10.5	11.3	8.6	7.7	7.1	6.8	6.3	95.9
Average snowy days	16.5	14.8	12.8	4.6	0.3	0.0	0.0	0.0	0.0	2.6	8.3	14.5	74.4
Average relative humidity (%)	80.7	76.8	70.9	67.4	69.8	72.0	72.0	73.2	76.7	79.5	82.4	84.4	75.5
Mean monthly sunshine hours	86.6	107.9	160.7	189.8	223.3	227.1	237.7	239.5	178.2	142.7	87.5	68.7	1,949.7
Source 1: NOAA
Source 2: SHMI (extremes, 1926–present)

== Population ==
Historical population
Year	Pop.	±%
1970	23,447	—
1980	38,077	+62.4%
1991	52,914	+39.0%
2001	56,157	+6.1%
2011	52,862	−5.9%
2021	49,855	−5.7%
Source: Censuses

Population statistic (10 years)
Year	1995	2005	2015	2025
Count	55,037	55,158	52,037	48,034
Difference		+0.21%	−5.65%	−7.69%

Population statistic
Year	2024	2025
Count	48,352	48,034
Difference		−0.65%

It has a population of 48,034 people (31 December 2025).

=== Ethnicity ===
Census 2021 (1+ %)
Ethnicity	Number	Fraction
Slovak	46,436	93.14%
Not found out	2835	5.68%
Romani	740	1.48%
Total	49,855	

In year 2021 was 49,855 people by ethnicity 46,436 as Slovak, 2835 as Not found out, 740 as Romani, 497 as Czech, 482 as Rusyn, 194 as Other, 140 as Hungarian, 131 as German, 99 as Ukrainian, 89 as Polish, 74 as Russian, 64 as Vietnamese, 26 as Chinese, 24 as English, 21 as Jewish, 21 as Italian, 20 as Canadian, 14 as Moravian, 14 as Croatian, 11 as Irish, 11 as Albanian, 9 as Turkish, 9 as Serbian, 9 as Austrian, 5 as Bulgarian, 4 as Romanian, 4 as French, 3 as Silesian, 3 as Greek and 2 as Korean.

Note on population: The difference values of population numbers in the table "Population statistic" and in the sections "Ethnicity" & "Religion" is caused by the use of various statistical methods.

=== Religion ===
Census 2021 (1+ %)
Religion	Number	Fraction
Roman Catholic Church	26,847	53.85%
None	12,829	25.73%
Not found out	3492	7%
Evangelical Church	2954	5.93%
Greek Catholic Church	1947	3.91%
Total	49,855	

In year 2021 was 49,855 people by religion 26,847 from Roman Catholic Church, 12,829 from None, 3492 from Not found out, 2954 from Evangelical Church, 1947 from Greek Catholic Church, 383 from Eastern Orthodox Church, 220 from Other and not ascertained christian church, 215 from Ad hoc movements, 206 from Christian Congregations in Slovakia, 149 from Other, 126 from Baptists Church, 79 from Buddhism, 72 from Jehovah's Witnesses, 60 from Paganism and natural spirituality, 58 from Apostolic Church, 53 from Calvinist Church, 43 from Seventh-day Adventist Church, 30 from Islam, 24 from United Methodist Church, 18 from Jewish community, 18 from Old Catholic Church, 12 from Hinduism, 6 from New Apostolic Church, 5 from Bahá'i Community, 3 from Czechoslovak Hussite Church, 3 from Church of the Brethren and 3 from Church of Jesus Christ of Latter-day Saints.

== Religion ==
The oldest churches here are the Roman Catholic Church and the Evangelical Church of the Augsburg Confession ( Lutherans). It also operates here: the Greek Catholic Church and Orthodox Church, Baptists, the Apostolic Church, Seventh-day Adventists, the Pentecostal Charismatic Church, and Jehovah's Witnesses.

Poprad

- Co-Cathedral of the Virgin Mary (Roman Catholic)
- Church of St. Giles (Roman Catholic)
- Church of St. Cyril and Methodius (Roman Catholic)
- Church of Holy Trinity (Lutheran)
- Pentecostal Church
- Church of St. Peter and Paul (Greek Catholic)
- Kingdom Hall of Jehovah's Witnesses
- Church of Holy Cross (Orthodox)

Veľká

- Church of St. John (Roman Catholic - Salesians)
- Church of Holy Trinity (Lutheran)
- Baptist church
- Church of Seventh-day Adventists

Spišská Sobota

- Church of St. George (Roman Catholic)
- Lutheran church

Matejovce

- Church of St. Stephen (Roman Catholic)
- Lutheran church

Stráže pod Tatrami

- Church of St. John (Roman Catholic)
- Lutheran church

Kvetnica

- Church of St. Helen (Roman Catholic)

== Landmarks ==
The historical centre is concentrated around St. Giles square (Námestie svätého Egídia), which is rimmed with houses predominantly from the 18th and 19th centuries. Churches in the city include the early-Gothic Catholic Church of St. Giles from the late 13th century and the classicist Lutheran Church of Holy Trinity from the 19th century.

Another historical area in Poprad is in Spišská Sobota, which was declared in 1953 to be a Town Monument Reserve. A significant landmark there is the Church of St. George, with five late-Gothic side altars and a main altar from the workshop of Master Paul of Levoča.

Modern places of interest include the Poprad-Tatry railway station and the AquaCity Poprad water park.

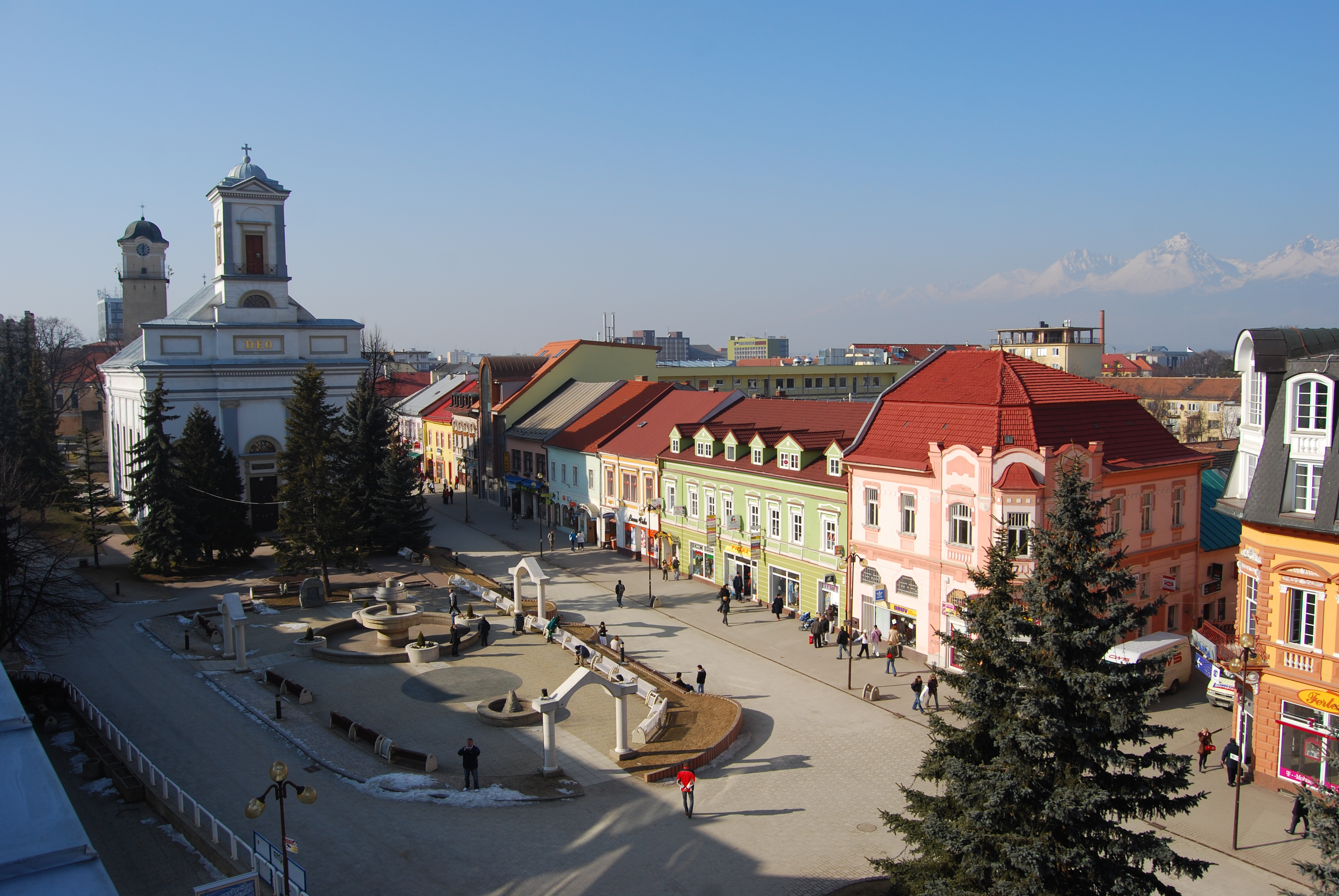
St. Giles Square with the Lutheran Church of Holy Trinity

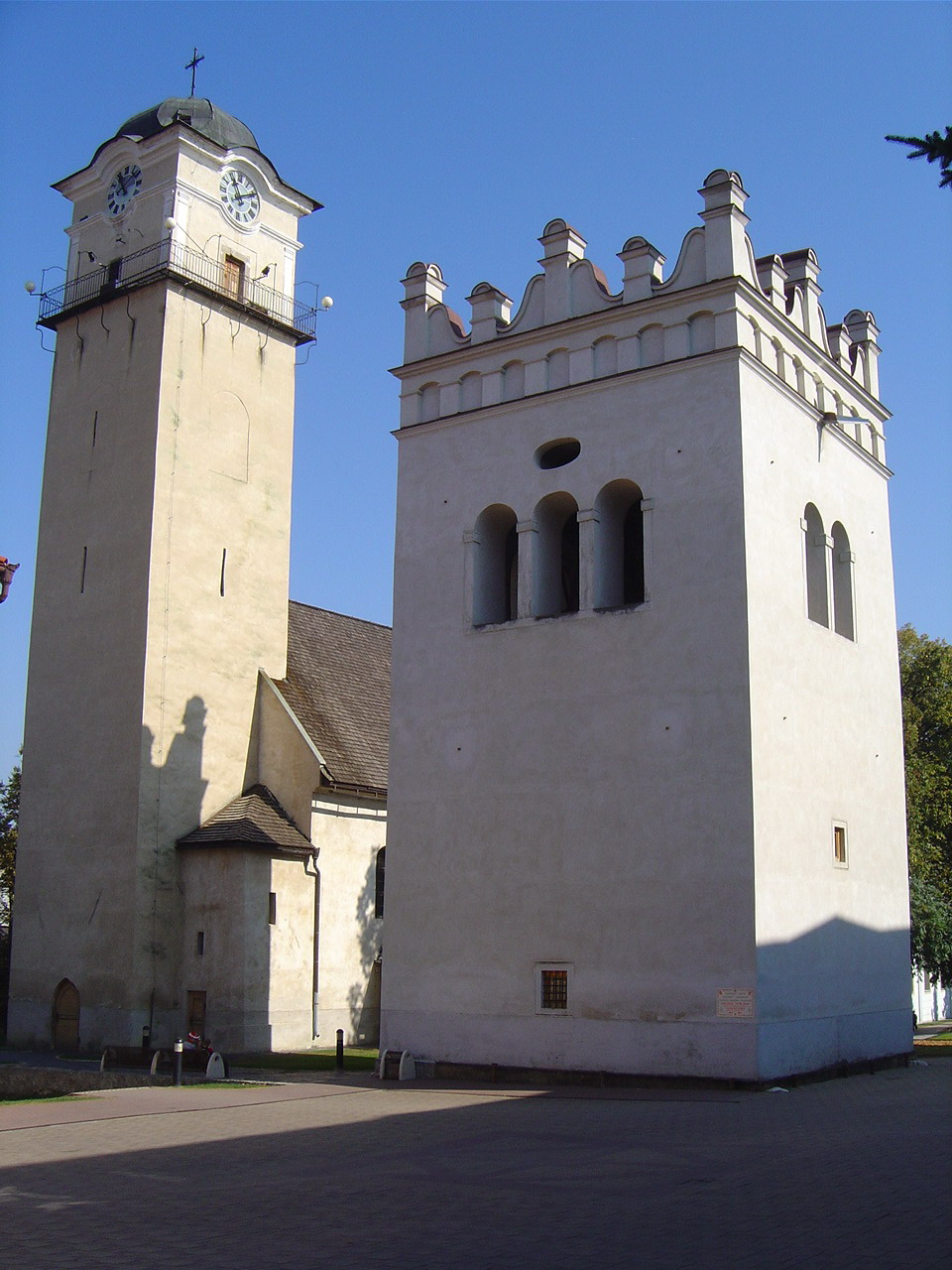
Church of St. Giles

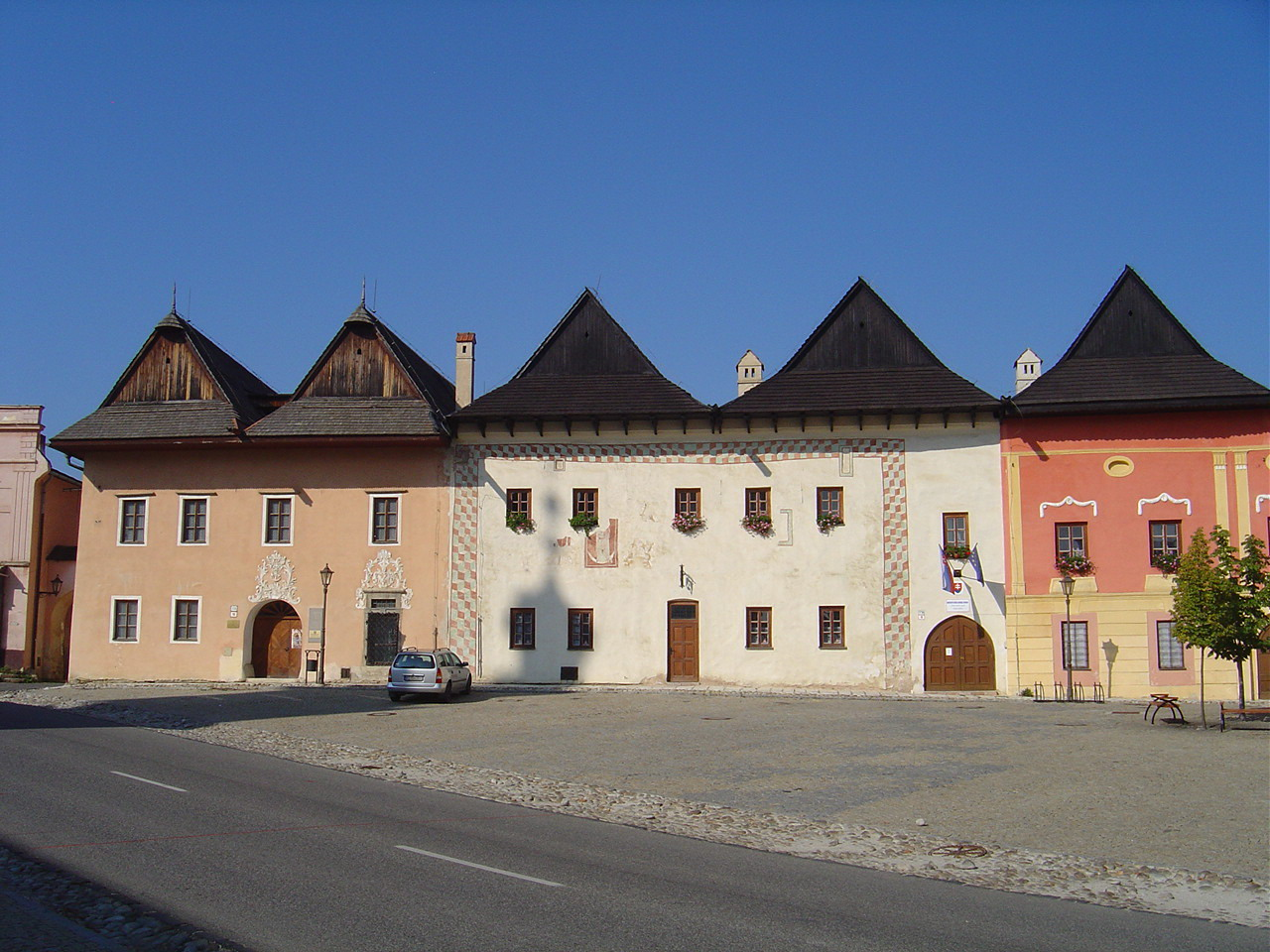
Main Square in Spišská Sobota

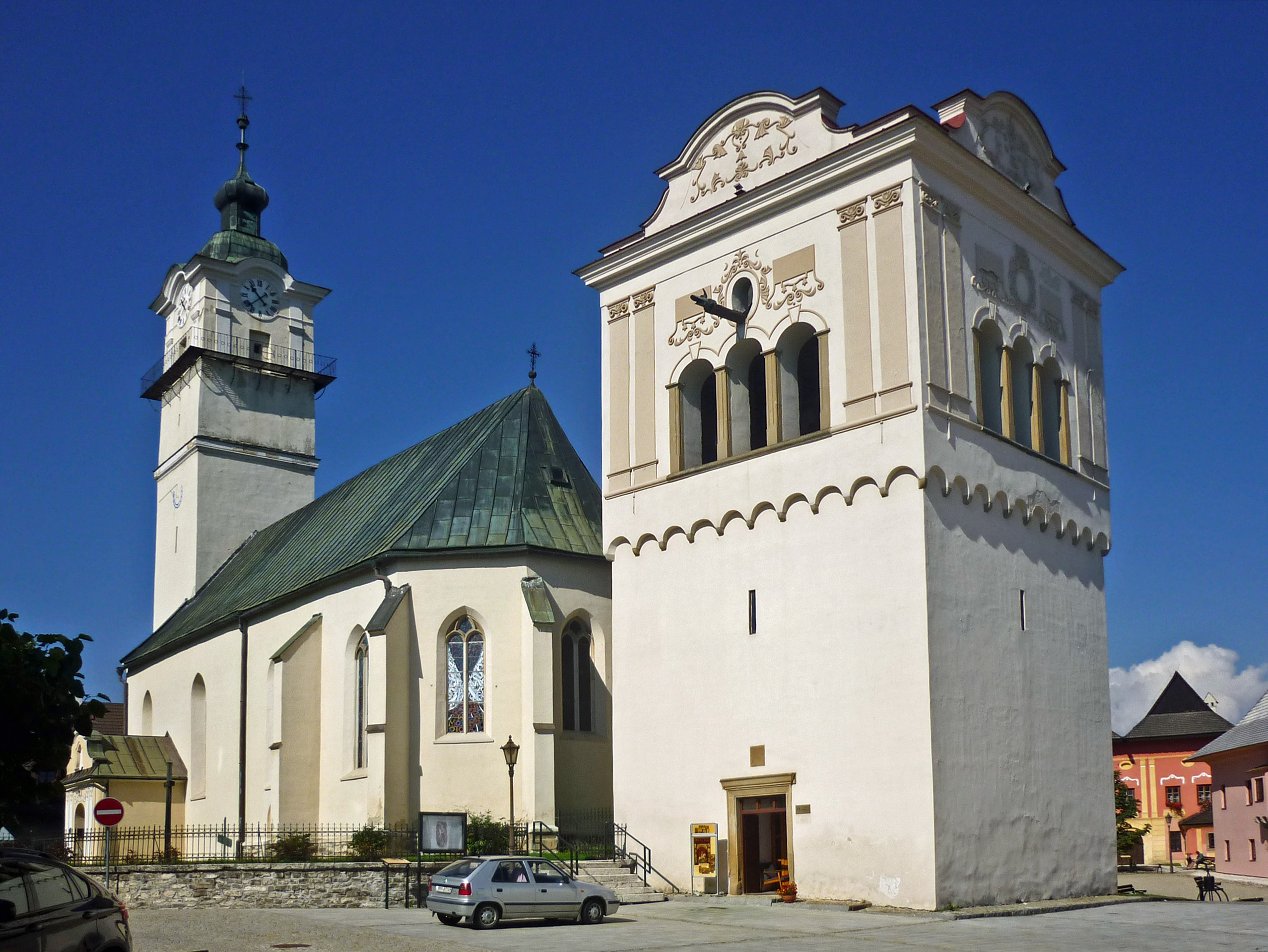
Church in Spišská Sobota

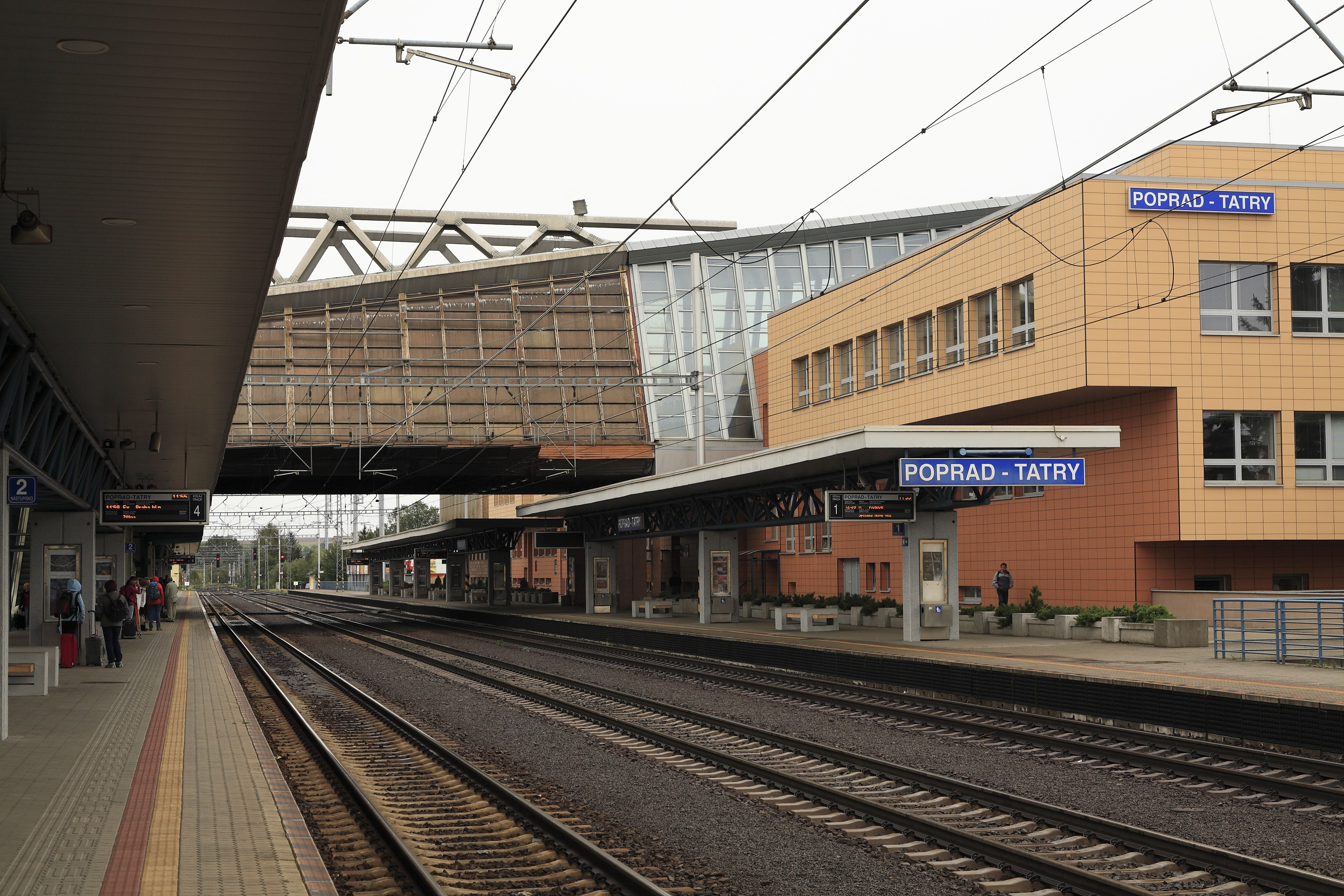
Poprad-Tatry railway station

== Government ==
Between 2003 and 2014, the mayor of Poprad was Anton Danko (former international ice-hockey referee). In the November 2014 municipal elections, he lost to Jozef Švagerko (KDH – Christian democrats).

== Territorial division ==
The city is divided into six boroughs for municipal administrative division:

1. Staré Mesto ["Old Town"]
2. Spišská Sobota
3. Stráže
4. Veľká
5. Matejovce
6. Kvetnica

== Sport ==
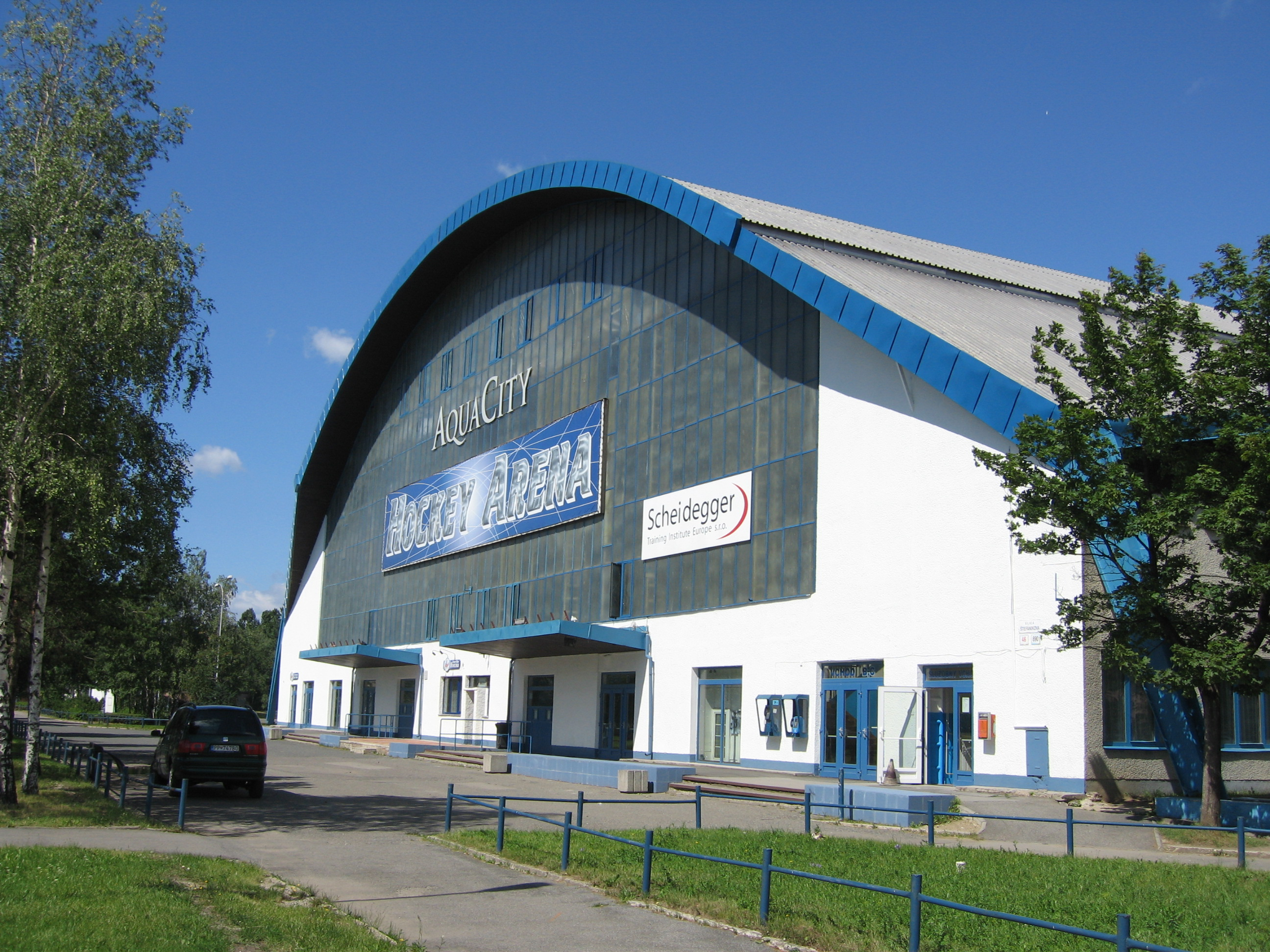
Arena of the ice hockey club HK Poprad

Poprad currently has one ice hockey club, HK Poprad, who play at the Poprad Ice Stadium.

Lev Poprad was another ice hockey club in Poprad, which used to play in the KHL for one season but was moved to the Czech capital, Prague, in 2012. Despite successful 2013/2014 seasons, the club has ended due to financial problems. Several former and current NHL hockey players were born in Poprad.

The city also hosted the 1994 Men's Ice Hockey World Championships, 1999 European Youth Olympic Winter Days, 2017 IIHF World U18 Championships and 1999 Winter Universiade. Every year, the ice hockey Tatra Cup is held. There was also an unsuccessful bid to host the 2006 Winter Olympics.

There are many football stadiums in Poprad; however, the main one is NTC Poprad, home of FK Poprad, founded in 1906 and the Slovakia national youth teams.

The local women's basketball club is Basketbalová Akadémia Mládeže Poprad (BAMP). Their matches are played in Aréna Poprad. The arena was also one of the venues at the 2017 editions of the FIVB Volleyball World League.

== Education ==
The city's system of primary education consists of 12 public schools and one religious primary school, enrolling in total of 5,464 pupils. Secondary education is represented by four grammar schools with 1,800 students, three specialized high schools with 1,566 students, and four vocational schools with 2,045 students (data as of 2007).

The city also hosted the 3rd International Biology Olympiad in 1993.

== Transport ==
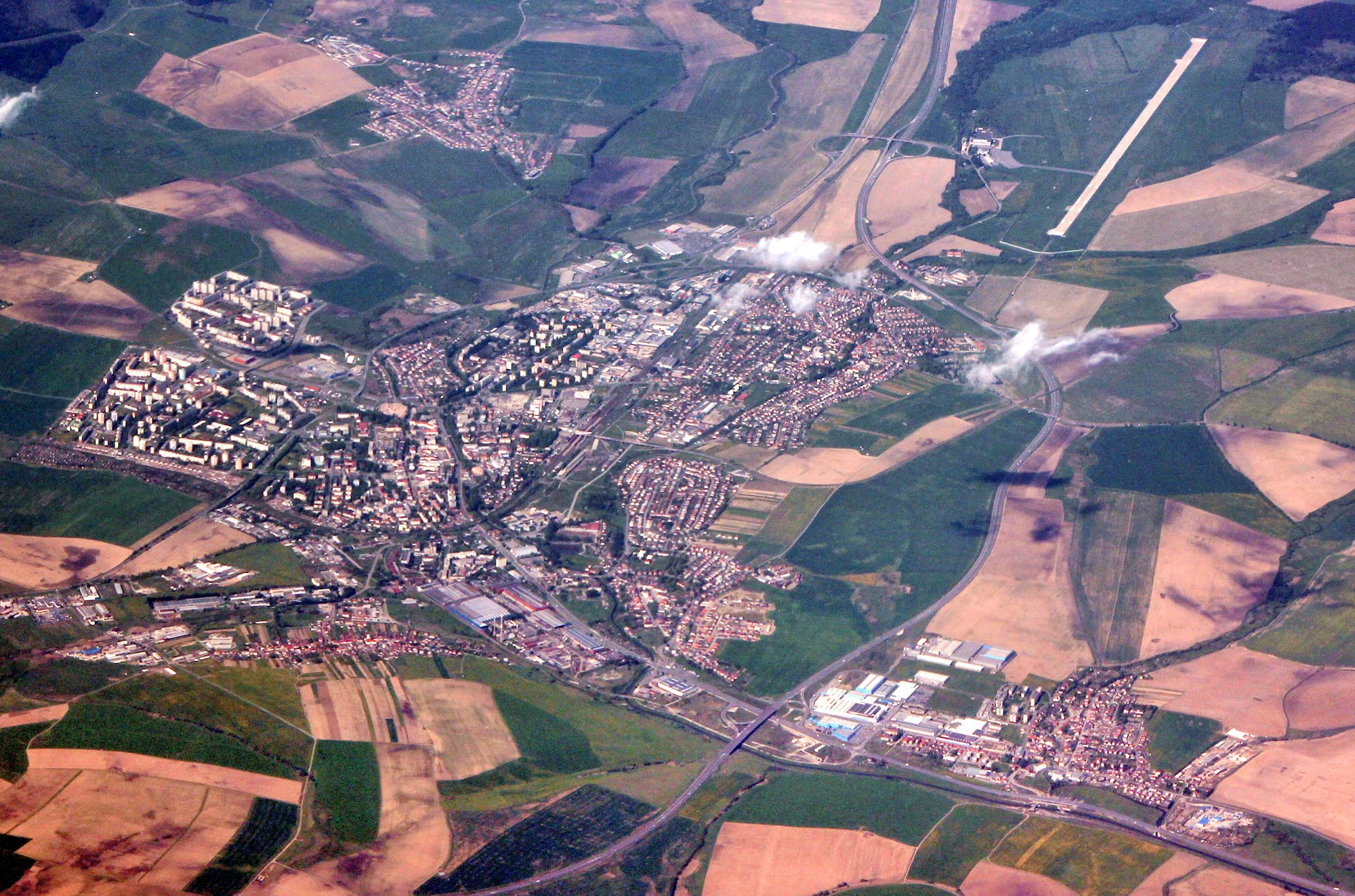
Aerial view of the city with the airport

Poprad is a gateway to the High Tatra mountain range, which is a popular tourist destination. The city lies on the main road (E 50) and railway connecting western and eastern Slovakia.

Poprad-Tatry railway station links Poprad with other major destinations on Slovakia's standard gauge rail network, and with the mountains via the metre gauge Tatra Electric Railway. The direct trains SuperCity Pendolino connect Poprad with Prague.

International Poprad–Tatry Airport from 1938, is an airport with the highest elevation in Central Europe. It also offers scheduled flights to London.

=== Bus transport ===
Lines: 1, 2, 3, 4, 5, 6, 7, 8

=== Rail transport ===
Lines: 183, 185

== Notable people ==
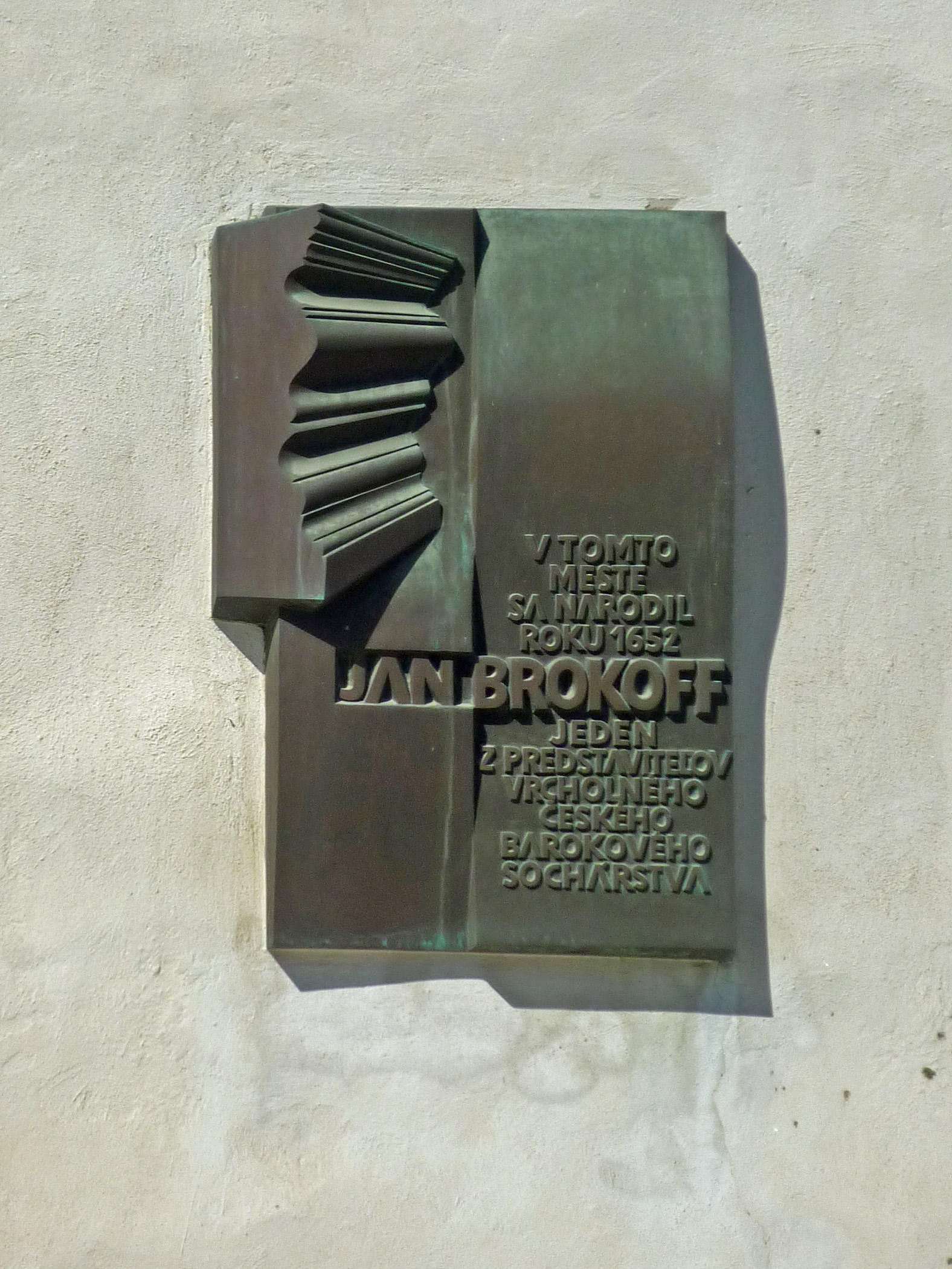
Memorial plaque of Jan Brokoff in Spišská Sobota

- Jan Brokoff (1652–1718) – Baroque-era sculptor and carver
- Leslie Kish (1910–2000) – statistician
- Tibor Sekelj (1912–1988) – explorer, Esperantist, writer and lawyer
- Adolf Burger (1917–2016) – typographer, author of memoirs on Operation Bernhard filmed as the Oscar-winning The Counterfeiters, grew up and trained in Poprad
- Miroslav Lajčák (born 1963) – diplomat
- Andrej Kiska (born 1963), politician, President of Slovakia (2014–2019)
- Lucia Kurilovská (born 1967), politician
- Ivan Štefunko (born 1977), politician
- Kamil Šaško (born 1985), politician

=== Sport ===
- Boris Prokopič (born 1988) – Austrian football player
- Peter Ihnačák (born 1957) – Ice hockey player
- Daniela Hantuchová (born 1983) – tennis player
- Anton Gavel (born 1984) – Slovak basketball player
- Peter Bondra (born 1986) – ice hockey player
- Tomáš Rigo (born 2002) - footballer
- Tamara Potocká (born 2002) - swimmer

== Twin towns – sister cities ==
Poprad is twinned with:

- Ústí nad Orlicí, Czech Republic
- Zakopane, Poland
- Vysoké Tatry, Slovakia
- Szarvas, Hungary
- (United Kingdom) Widnes, England, UK
- Oulu, Finland
