= Košice railway station =

Railway station in Slovakia

Košice
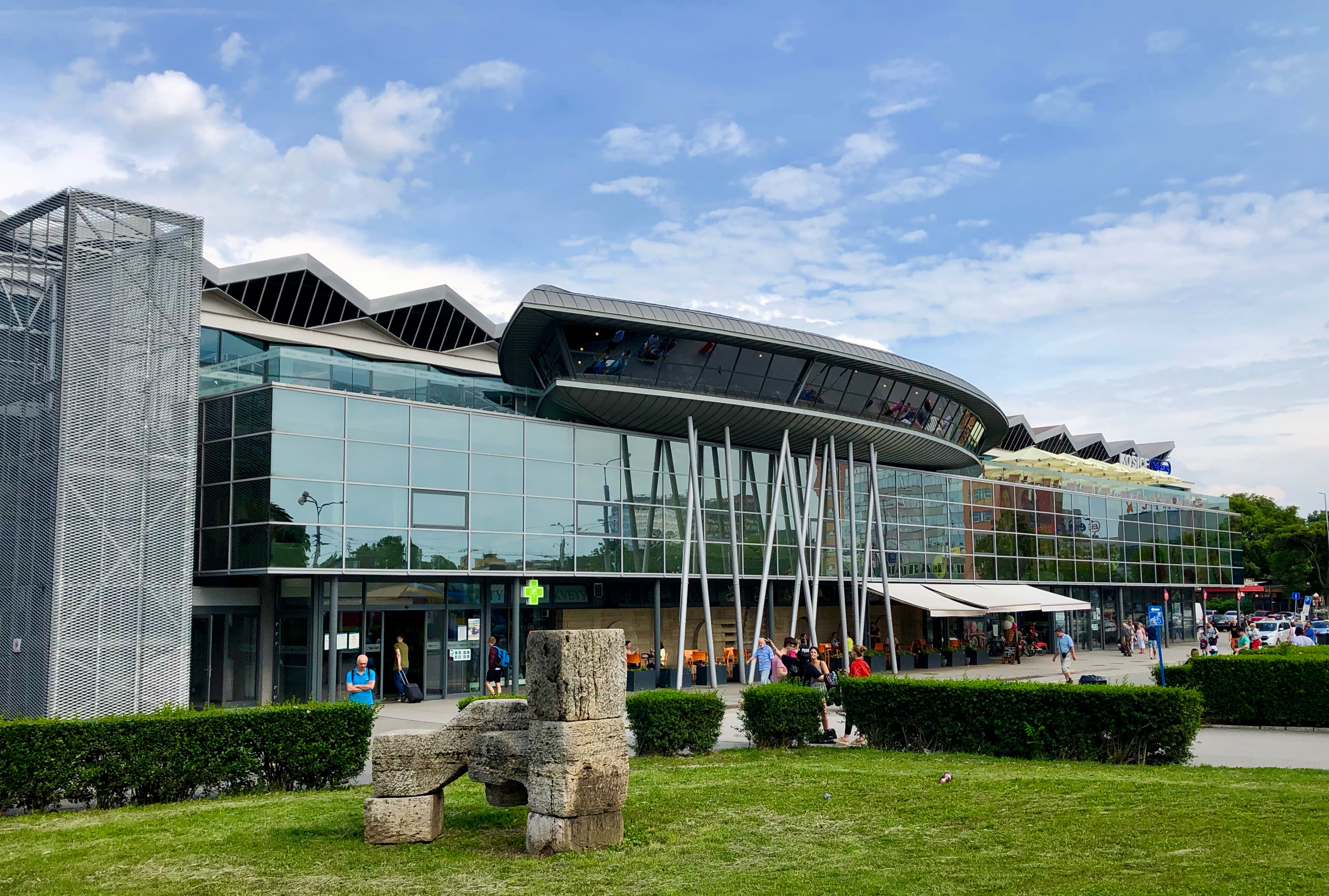
- The station building in 2018

General information
- Location: Staničné námestie 04001 Košice-Staré Mesto; Košice; Košice I Košice Region; Slovakia
- Coordinates: 48°43′21″N 21°16′05″E
- Owner: Železnice Slovenskej republiky (ŽSR)
- Operator: Železnice Slovenskej republiky
- Lines: Zvolen–Košice; Miskolc–Košice; Košice–Žilina (Košice)–Kysak–Prešov–Muszyna (PKP); Košice–Čierna nad Tisou–Tschop (Ukrsalisnyzja)
- Distance: 98.77 km (61.37 mi) from Slovakia—Ukraine border
- Platforms: 4
- Connections: Košice tramway network; Local buses

History
- Opened: 14 August 1860
Location
- Location within Slovakia

Košice railway station (Slovak: Železničná stanica Košice, also known for a short period as Košice hlavná stanica) serves the city of Košice, seat of the Košice Region, eastern Slovakia.

Opened in 1860, the station is the eastern terminus of the Košice–Žilina railway, which forms part of Slovakia's main east–west rail corridor. It is also the terminus of a number of other lines, some of them linking Slovakia with other countries.

The station is currently owned by Železnice Slovenskej republiky (ŽSR); train services are operated by Železničná spoločnosť Slovensko (ZSSK), RegioJet (RJ) and LEO Express (LE) (since 14 December 2014).

== Location ==
Košice railway station is situated at Staničné námestie, about 1 km (0.62 mi) east of St. Elisabeth Cathedral. It is near the western bank of the river Hornád, in the borough of Staré Mesto, which forms part of the Košice I district.

== History ==
The station was opened on 14 August 1860, upon the inauguration of the Miskolc–Košice railway, which linked Košice with Miskolc in present-day Hungary.

The current station building has been in place since 1973, and is a modified version of an earlier building constructed in 1871.

== Lines ==
Košice railway station is a hub for the following Slovakian railway lines:

- 160 Zvolen–Košice
- 169 Košice−Hidasnémeti (MÁV START)
- 180 Košice–Žilina
- 188 (Košice)–Kysak–Prešov–Muszyna (PKP)
- 190 Košice–Čierna nad Tisou–Chop (Ukrsalisnyzja)

Lines 180 and 190 combine to form part of Pan-European Corridor Va, which runs from Venice in Italy to Kyiv in Ukraine, via Bratislava, Žilina, Košice and Uzhhorod.

== Interchange ==
The station offers interchange with Košice trams and local buses managed by the Dopravný podnik mesta Košice (DPMK), or Košice Transit Company. Košice's long-distance bus station is nearby.

== Services ==
Preceding station	ŽSSK	Following station
Kysak toward Prague	EuroNight; EN Slovakia	Terminus
Kysak toward Bratislava	InterCity	Terminus
Terminus	EuroCity	Hidasnémeti (Hungary) toward Budapest
Kysak toward Bratislava	Regional fast trains	Terminus
Kysak toward Prešov	Regional fast trains	Haniska pri Košiciach toward Zvolen
Terminus	Regional fast trains	Haniska pri Košiciach toward Zvolen
Terminus	Regional Express	Košice predmestie toward Humenné
Ťahanovce toward Prešov or Poprad-Tatry	Stopping trains	Terminus
Terminus	Stopping trains	Košice predmestie toward Čierna nad Tisou
Terminus	Stopping trains	Košice predmestie toward Moldava nad Bodvou

== See also ==
- History of rail transport in Slovakia
- Public transport in Košice
- Rail transport in Slovakia
