= Kysak =

Kysak Sároskőszeg
- Municipality
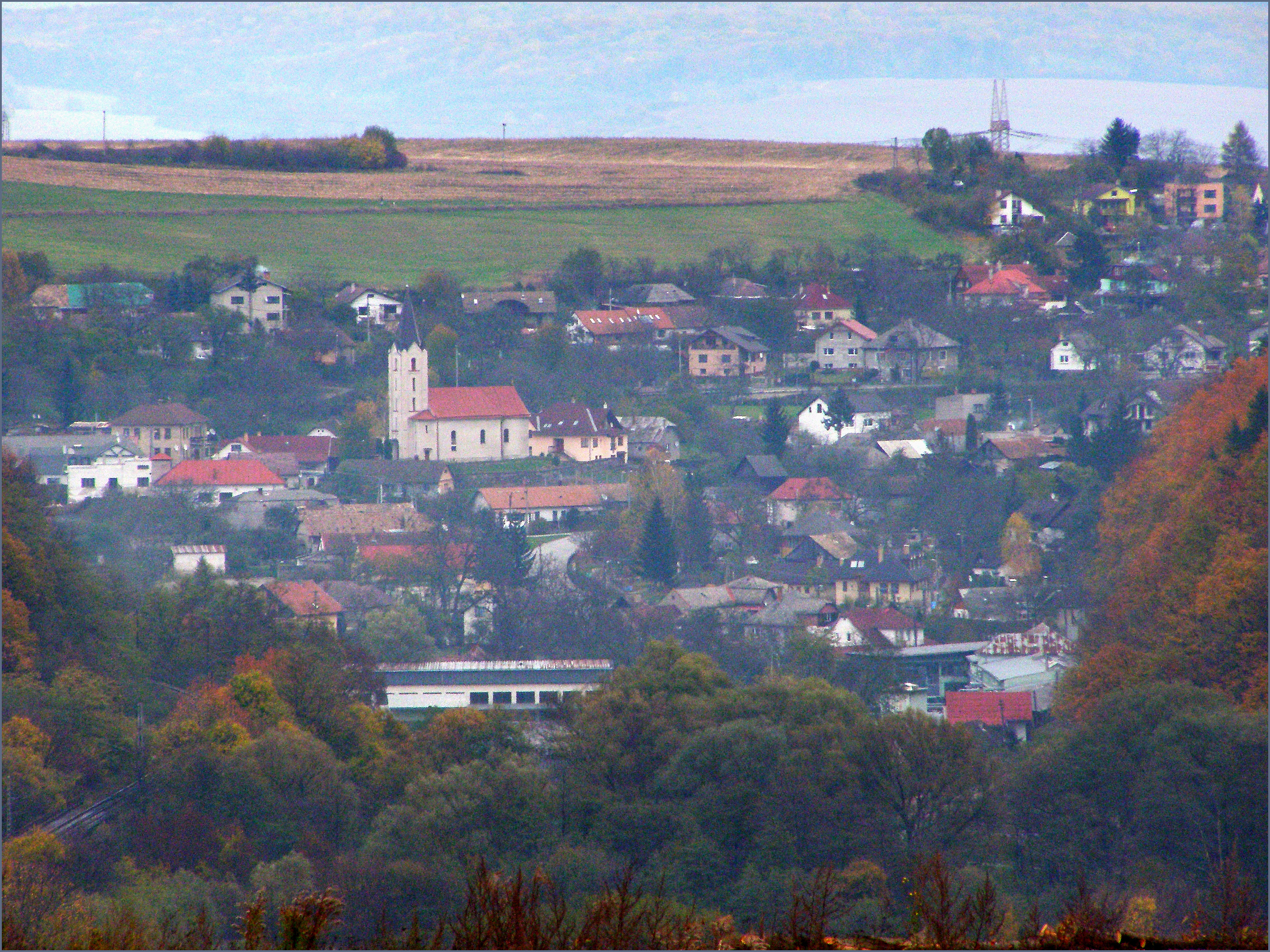

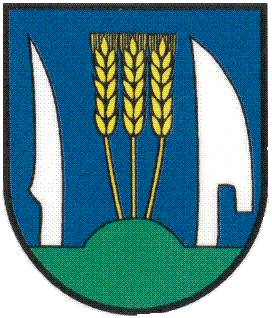
- Flag Coat of arms

- Location of Kysak in the Košice Region Location of Kysak in Slovakia
- Coordinates: 48.86°N 21.22°E
- Country: Slovakia
- Region: Košice Region
- District: Košice-okolie District
- First mentioned: 1330

Area
  - Total: 10.89 km^{2} (4.20 sq mi)
- Elevation: 256 m (840 ft)

Population (2025)
  - Total: 1,409
- Time zone: UTC+1 (CET)
  - Summer (DST): UTC+2 (CEST)
- Postal code: 448 1
- Area code: +421 55
- Vehicle registration plate (until 2022): KS
- Website: www.kysak.sk

Kysak (Hungarian: Sároskőszeg) is a village and railway hub in Košice-okolie District in the Košice Region of eastern Slovakia.

== History ==
Historically, the village was first mentioned in 1330. There is a monument as a memory of the soldiers killed in the first and second World Wars.

== Geography ==
The municipality lies at an altitude of 256 metres (840 ft) and covers an area of 10.89 km^{2} (4.20 sq mi) (2025).

== Population ==
Population statistic (10 years)
Year	1995	2005	2015	2025
Count	1350	1390	1450	1409
Difference		+2.96%	+4.31%	−2.82%

Population statistic
Year	2024	2025
Count	1418	1409
Difference		−0.63%

It has a population of 1409 people (31 December 2025).

=== Ethnicity ===
Census 2021 (1+ %)
Ethnicity	Number	Fraction
Slovak	1403	95.5%
Not found out	54	3.67%
Total	1469	

In year 2021 was 1469 people by ethnicity 1403 as Slovak, 54 as Not found out, 10 as Rusyn, 8 as Hungarian, 7 as Czech, 3 as Other, 2 as German, 1 as Irish, 1 as Ukrainian, 1 as Silesian, 1 as Russian, 1 as Polish, 1 as Moravian and 1 as Greek.

Note on population: The difference values of population numbers in the table "Population statistic" and in the sections "Ethnicity" & "Religion" is caused by the use of various statistical methods.

=== Religion ===
Census 2021 (1+ %)
Religion	Number	Fraction
Roman Catholic Church	924	62.9%
None	223	15.18%
Evangelical Church	213	14.5%
Not found out	53	3.61%
Greek Catholic Church	33	2.25%
Total	1469	

In year 2021 was 1469 people by religion 924 from Roman Catholic Church, 223 from None, 213 from Evangelical Church, 53 from Not found out, 33 from Greek Catholic Church, 6 from Calvinist Church, 4 from Other, 3 from Other and not ascertained christian church, 3 from Church of the Brethren, 2 from Apostolic Church, 1 from Jehovah's Witnesses, 1 from Hinduism, 1 from United Methodist Church, 1 from Buddhism and 1 from Ad hoc movements.

== Transport ==
Kysak railway station is an important railway junction, where the Košice–Plaveč–Čirč–Muszyna railway diverges towards Poland from the Košice–Žilina railway, which is part of Slovakia's main east-west rail corridor.
