= Prešov railway station =

Railway station in Prešov, Slovakia

Prešov railway station Železničná stanica Prešov
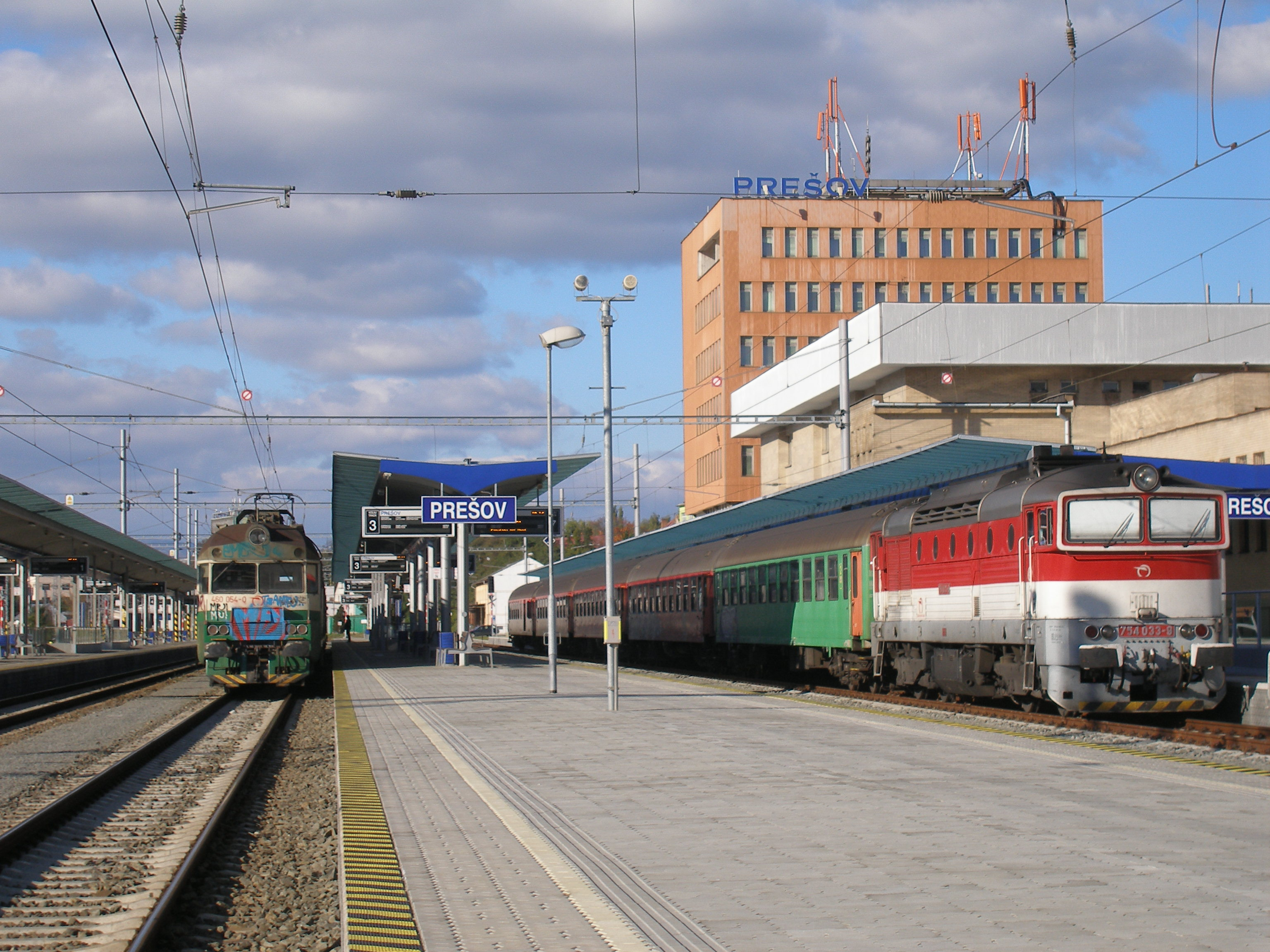
- Prešov railway station – Železničná stanica Prešov

General information
- Location: Železničná stanica 080 01 Prešov; Slovakia
- Coordinates: 48°59′1″N 21°15′0″E
- Owner: Železnice Slovenskej republiky
- Lines: Košice – Plaveč – Čirč – Muszyna (188); Prešov – Humenné (193); Prešov – Bardejov (194)
- Platforms: 3
- Train operators: Železničná spoločnosť Slovensko (ŽSSK)
- Connections: Trolleybus and bus city public transport

History
- Opened: 12 March 1872
- Rebuilt: 1970s
Location
- Location within Slovakia

Prešov railway station (Slovak: Železničná stanica Prešov) is a railway station in the city of Prešov in Prešov Region, the third biggest city in Slovakia.

== Description ==
The Prešov railway station was opened in 1872. It serves daily connections of local and express trains in direction to Bratislava and Košice.

In 2007, building and platforms became completely reconstructed and the parking lot is also planned. The station also has a cash desk for the sale of national and international tickets, luggage storage, and there are several refreshment points, a restaurant and a waiting room.
