= Obišovce =

Obišovce Abos
- Municipality
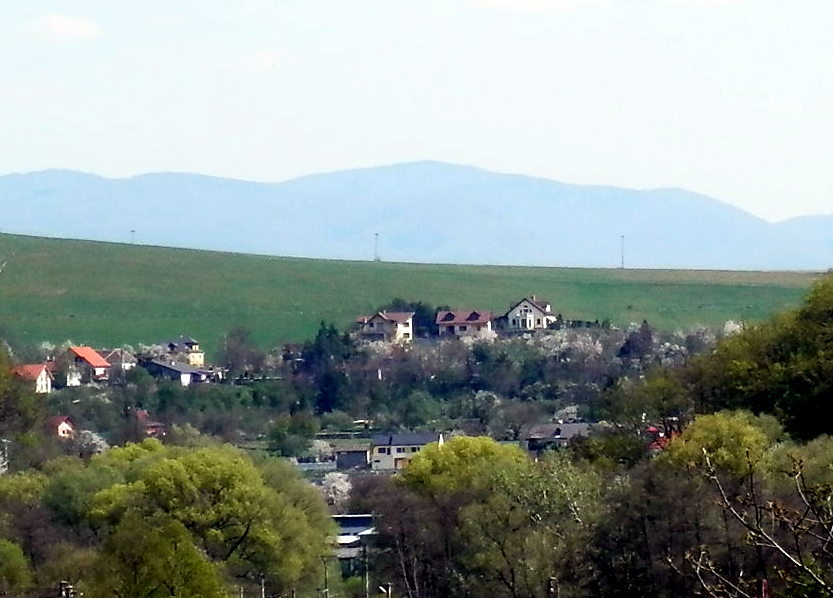

- Flag

- Location of Obišovce in the Košice Region Location of Obišovce in Slovakia
- Coordinates: 48.87°N 21.25°E
- Country: Slovakia
- Region: Košice Region
- District: Košice-okolie District
- First mentioned: 1289

Area
  - Total: 9.81 km^{2} (3.79 sq mi)
- Elevation: 254 m (833 ft)

Population (2025)
  - Total: 491
- Time zone: UTC+1 (CET)
  - Summer (DST): UTC+2 (CEST)
- Postal code: 448 1
- Area code: +421 55
- Vehicle registration plate (until 2022): KS
- Website: www.obisovce.sk

Obišovce (Slovak pronunciation: [ˈɔbiʂɔwtse]; Hungarian: Abos) is a village and municipality in Košice-okolie District in the Kosice Region of eastern Slovakia.

== History ==
In historical records the village was first mentioned in 1289.

== Geography ==
The municipality lies at an altitude of 254 metres (833 ft) and covers an area of 9.81 km^{2} (3.79 sq mi) (2025).

== Population ==
Population statistic (10 years)
Year	1995	2005	2015	2025
Count	374	387	433	491
Difference		+3.47%	+11.88%	+13.39%

Population statistic
Year	2024	2025
Count	482	491
Difference		+1.86%

It has a population of 491 people (31 December 2025).

=== Ethnicity ===
Census 2021 (1+ %)
Ethnicity	Number	Fraction
Slovak	460	97.66%
German	5	1.06%
Total	471	

In year 2021 was 471 people by ethnicity 460 as Slovak, 5 as German, 4 as Rusyn, 3 as Polish, 3 as Hungarian, 2 as Czech, 2 as Not found out, 1 as Irish, 1 as Ukrainian, 1 as Russian, 1 as Canadian and 1 as Other.

Note on population: The difference values of population numbers in the table "Population statistic" and in the sections "Ethnicity" & "Religion" is caused by the use of various statistical methods.

=== Religion ===
Census 2021 (1+ %)
Religion	Number	Fraction
Roman Catholic Church	270	57.32%
None	101	21.44%
Evangelical Church	75	15.92%
Greek Catholic Church	9	1.91%
Total	471	

In year 2021 was 471 people by religion 270 from Roman Catholic Church, 101 from None, 75 from Evangelical Church, 9 from Greek Catholic Church, 4 from Not found out, 3 from Buddhism, 2 from Paganism and natural spirituality, 2 from Other, 1 from Calvinist Church, 1 from Eastern Orthodox Church, 1 from Other and not ascertained christian church, 1 from Bahá'i Community and 1 from Ad hoc movements.

== Culture ==
The village has a public library and food facilities.
