= Veľká Lodina =

Veľká Lodina Nagyladna
- Municipality
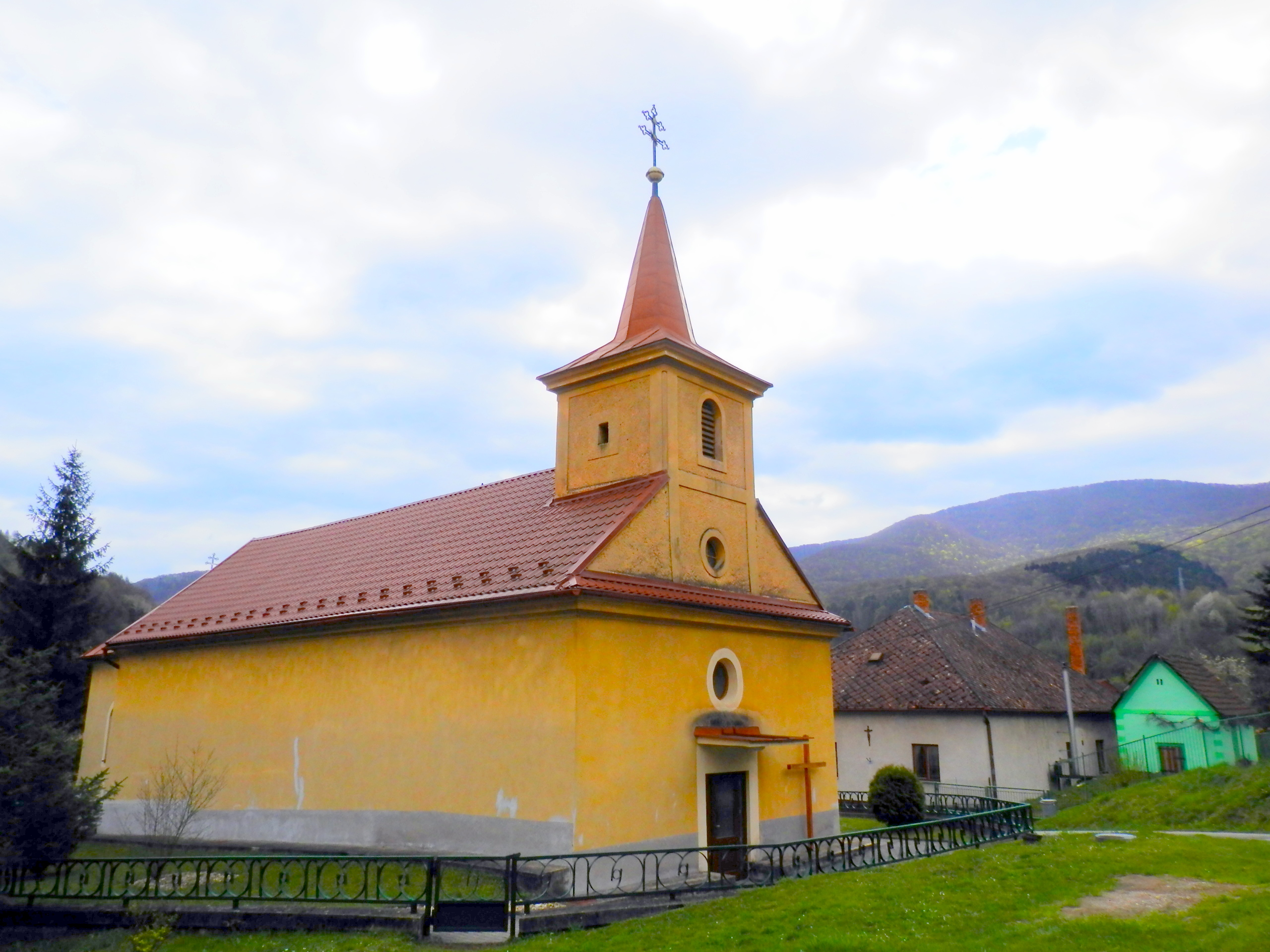

- Flag

- Location of Veľká Lodina in the Košice Region Location of Veľká Lodina in Slovakia
- Coordinates: 48.87°N 21.17°E
- Country: Slovakia
- Region: Košice Region
- District: Košice-okolie District
- First mentioned: 1423

Government
  - Mayor: Ján Lukáč (STAROSTOVIA A NEZÁVISLÍ KANDIDÁTI)

Area
  - Total: 19.69 km^{2} (7.60 sq mi)
- Elevation: 255 m (837 ft)

Population (2025)
  - Total: 326
- Time zone: UTC+1 (CET)
  - Summer (DST): UTC+2 (CEST)
- Postal code: 443 2
- Area code: +421 55
- Vehicle registration plate (until 2022): KS
- Website: velkalodina.atknet.sk

Veľká Lodina (Hungarian: Nagyladna) is a village and municipality in Košice-okolie District in the Kosice Region of eastern Slovakia.

== History ==
In historical records the village was first mentioned in 1423.

== Geography ==
The municipality lies at an altitude of 255 metres (837 ft) and covers an area of 19.69 km^{2} (7.60 sq mi) (2025).

== Population ==
Population statistic (10 years)
Year	1995	2005	2015	2025
Count	230	254	283	326
Difference		+10.43%	+11.41%	+15.19%

Population statistic
Year	2024	2025
Count	321	326
Difference		+1.55%

It has a population of 326 people (31 December 2025).

=== Ethnicity ===
Census 2021 (1+ %)
Ethnicity	Number	Fraction
Slovak	263	82.7%
Romani	131	41.19%
Not found out	14	4.4%
Total	318	

In year 2021 was 318 people by ethnicity 263 as Slovak, 131 as Romani, 14 as Not found out, 2 as Other and 1 as Hungarian.

Note on population: The difference values of population numbers in the table "Population statistic" and in the sections "Ethnicity" & "Religion" is caused by the use of various statistical methods.

=== Religion ===
Census 2021 (1+ %)
Religion	Number	Fraction
Roman Catholic Church	240	75.47%
None	41	12.89%
Not found out	21	6.6%
Greek Catholic Church	6	1.89%
Total	318	

In year 2021 was 318 people by religion 240 from Roman Catholic Church, 41 from None, 21 from Not found out, 6 from Greek Catholic Church, 3 from Eastern Orthodox Church, 2 from Other, 2 from Evangelical Church, 1 from Calvinist Church, 1 from Christian Congregations in Slovakia and 1 from Ad hoc movements.
