= Trebejov =

Village and municipality in Slovakia

Trebejov Terebő
- Municipality
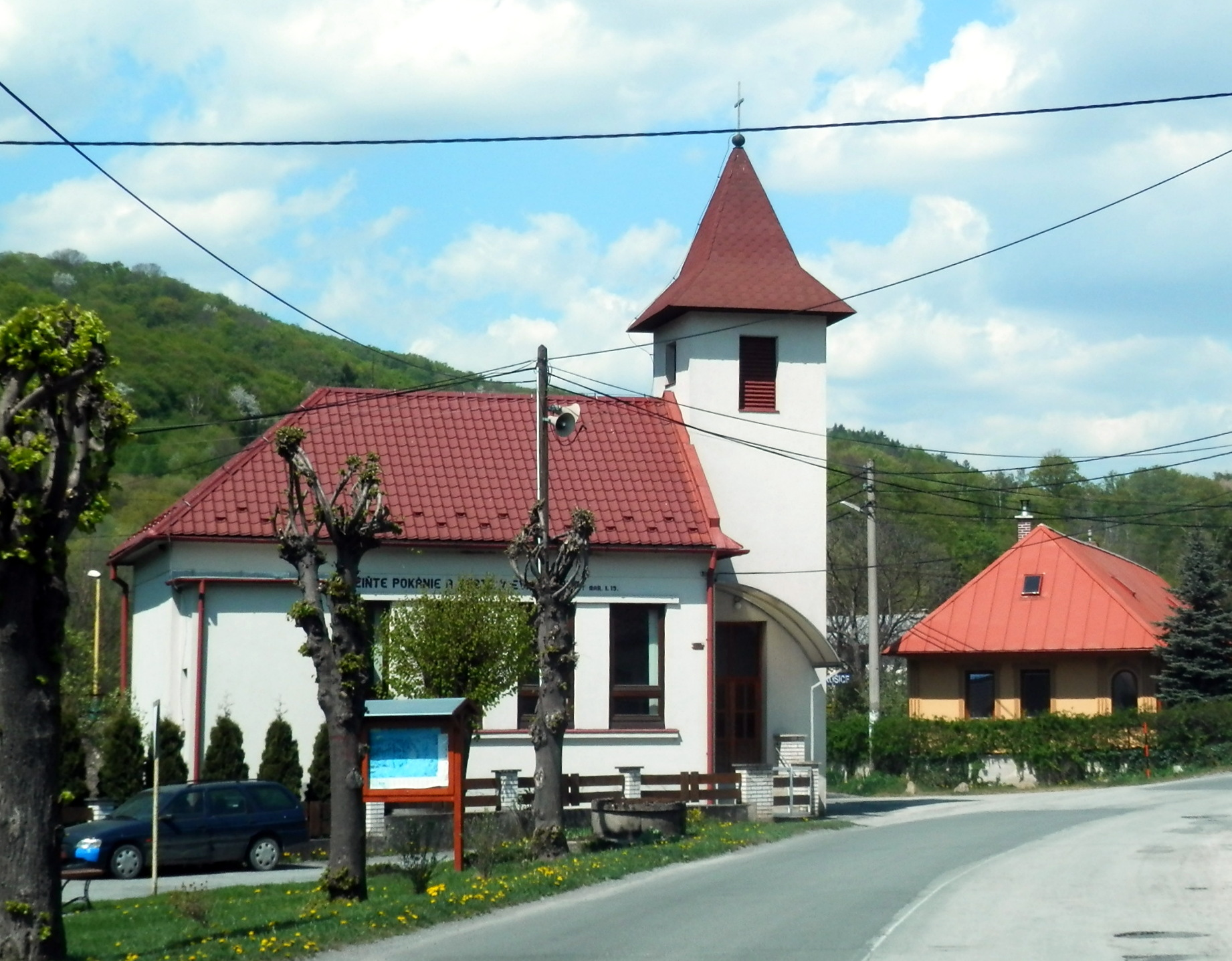

- Flag

- Location of Trebejov in the Košice Region Location of Trebejov in Slovakia
- Coordinates: 48.83°N 21.23°E
- Country: Slovakia
- Region: Košice Region
- District: Košice-okolie District
- First mentioned: 1289

Area
  - Total: 7.67 km^{2} (2.96 sq mi)
- Elevation: 241 m (791 ft)

Population (2025)
  - Total: 212
- Time zone: UTC+1 (CET)
  - Summer (DST): UTC+2 (CEST)
- Postal code: 448 1
- Area code: +421 55
- Vehicle registration plate (until 2022): KS
- Website: www.trebejov.sk

Trebejov (Hungarian: Terebő) is a village and municipality in Košice-okolie District in the Kosice Region of eastern Slovakia. In historical records, the village was first mentioned in 1289. The village lies at an altitude of 240 m, and covers an area of 7.671 km².

== Geography ==
The municipality lies at an altitude of 241 metres (791 ft) and covers an area of 7.67 km^{2} (2.96 sq mi) (2025).

== Population ==
Population statistic (10 years)
Year	1995	2005	2015	2025
Count	129	168	199	212
Difference		+30.23%	+18.45%	+6.53%

Population statistic
Year	2024	2025
Count	215	212
Difference		−1.39%

It has a population of 212 people (31 December 2025).

=== Ethnicity ===
Census 2021 (1+ %)
Ethnicity	Number	Fraction
Slovak	197	95.63%
Not found out	5	2.42%
Ukrainian	3	1.45%
Total	206	

In year 2021 was 206 people by ethnicity 197 as Slovak, 5 as Not found out, 3 as Ukrainian, 2 as Rusyn, 1 as Czech, 1 as Romani and 1 as Hungarian.

Note on population: The difference values of population numbers in the table "Population statistic" and in the sections "Ethnicity" & "Religion" is caused by the use of various statistical methods.

=== Religion ===
Census 2021 (1+ %)
Religion	Number	Fraction
Roman Catholic Church	70	33.98%
None	64	31.07%
Evangelical Church	57	27.67%
Greek Catholic Church	4	1.94%
Baptists Church	4	1.94%
Not found out	3	1.46%
Total	206	

In year 2021 was 206 people by religion 70 from Roman Catholic Church, 64 from None, 57 from Evangelical Church, 4 from Greek Catholic Church, 4 from Baptists Church, 3 from Not found out, 2 from Calvinist Church, 1 from Church of the Brethren and 1 from Ad hoc movements.
