= Žilina railway station =

Railway station in Slovakia

Žilina
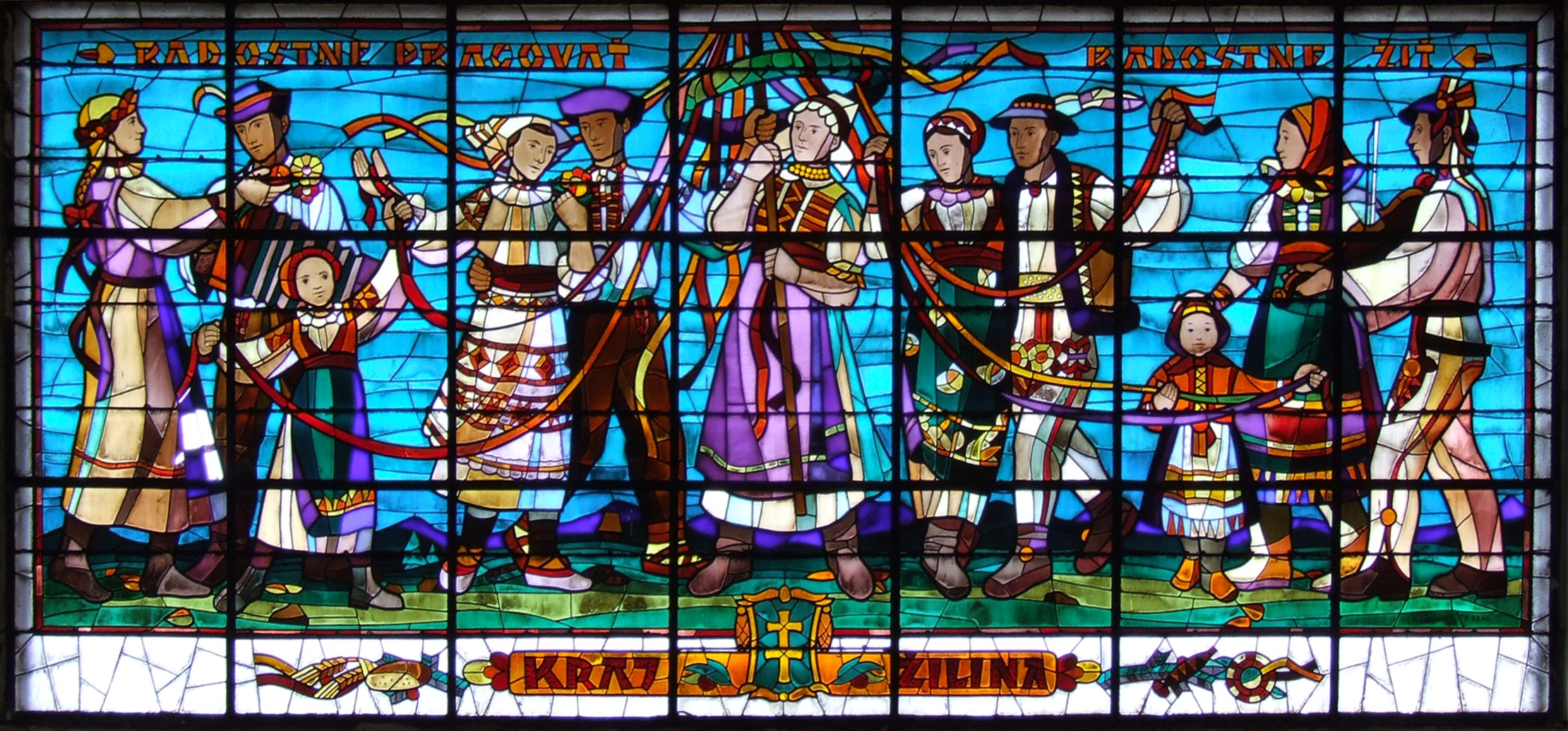
- Stained glass window in the station building, 2007

General information
- Location: Pavla Orságha Hviezdoslava; 01001 Žilina; Žilina; Žilina; Žilina Region; Slovakia
- Coordinates: 49°13′37″N 18°44′46″E
- Owner: Železnice Slovenskej republiky
- Operator: Železnice Slovenskej republiky
- Lines: Bratislava–Žilina; Žilina–Rajec; Košice–Žilina; Žilina–Čadca–Svrčinovec zastávka–Mosty u Jablunkova (ČD)
- Distance: 337.632 km (209.795 mi) from Slovakia—Ukraine border
- Connections: Local buses

History
- Opened: 8 January 1871
Location
- Location within Slovakia

Žilina railway station (Slovak: Železničná stanica Žilina) serves the city and municipality of Žilina, seat of the Žilina Region, northern Slovakia. Opened in 1871, the station is an important railway junction between the Bratislava–Žilina railway and the Košice–Žilina railway, both of which form part of Slovakia's main east–west rail corridor. It is also a junction for two other lines.

The station is currently owned by Železnice Slovenskej republiky (ŽSR); train services are operated by Železničná spoločnosť Slovensko (ZSSK).

== Location ==
Žilina railway station is situated in Pavla Orságha Hviezdoslava, at the northeastern edge of the city centre.

== History ==
The station was opened on 8 January 1871, upon the inauguration of the Český Těšín–Žilina section of the Košice–Bohumín Railway.

== Facilities ==
The station building is decorated with stained glass windows. It houses information and ticketing facilities, and a restaurant.

== Lines ==
Žilina railway station is the junction of the following Slovakian railway lines:

- 120 Bratislava–Žilina
- 126 Žilina–Rajec
- 127 Žilina–Čadca–Svrčinovec zastávka–Mosty u Jablunkova (ČD) (part of the Košice–Bohumín Railway)
- 180 Košice–Žilina (also part of the Košice–Bohumín Railway)

Lines 120 and 180 are both part of Pan-European Corridor Va, which runs from Venice in Italy to Kyiv in Ukraine, via Bratislava, Žilina, Košice and Uzhhorod.

== Services ==
Preceding station	ŽSSK	Following station
Čadca toward Prague	EuroNight; EN Slovakia	Ružomberok toward Košice
Trenčín toward Bratislava	InterCity	Liptovský Mikuláš toward Košice
Čadca toward Ostrava	Regional fast trains	Vrútky toward Zvolen or Košice
Považská Bystrica toward Vsetín or Bratislava	Regional fast trains	Terminus
Brodno toward Čadca	Stopping trains	Teplička nad Váhom toward Zvolen or Košice
Horný Hričov toward Trenčín or Púchov	Stopping trains	Teplička nad Váhom toward Zvolen or Košice
Žilina Záriečie toward Rajec	Stopping trains	Terminus
Preceding station	RegioJet	Following station
Kysucké Nové Mesto toward Praha hl.n.	IC RegioJet	Terminus

== Interchange ==
The station offers interchange with local buses.

== See also ==
- History of rail transport in Slovakia
- Rail transport in Slovakia
