= Košice–Bohumín Railway =

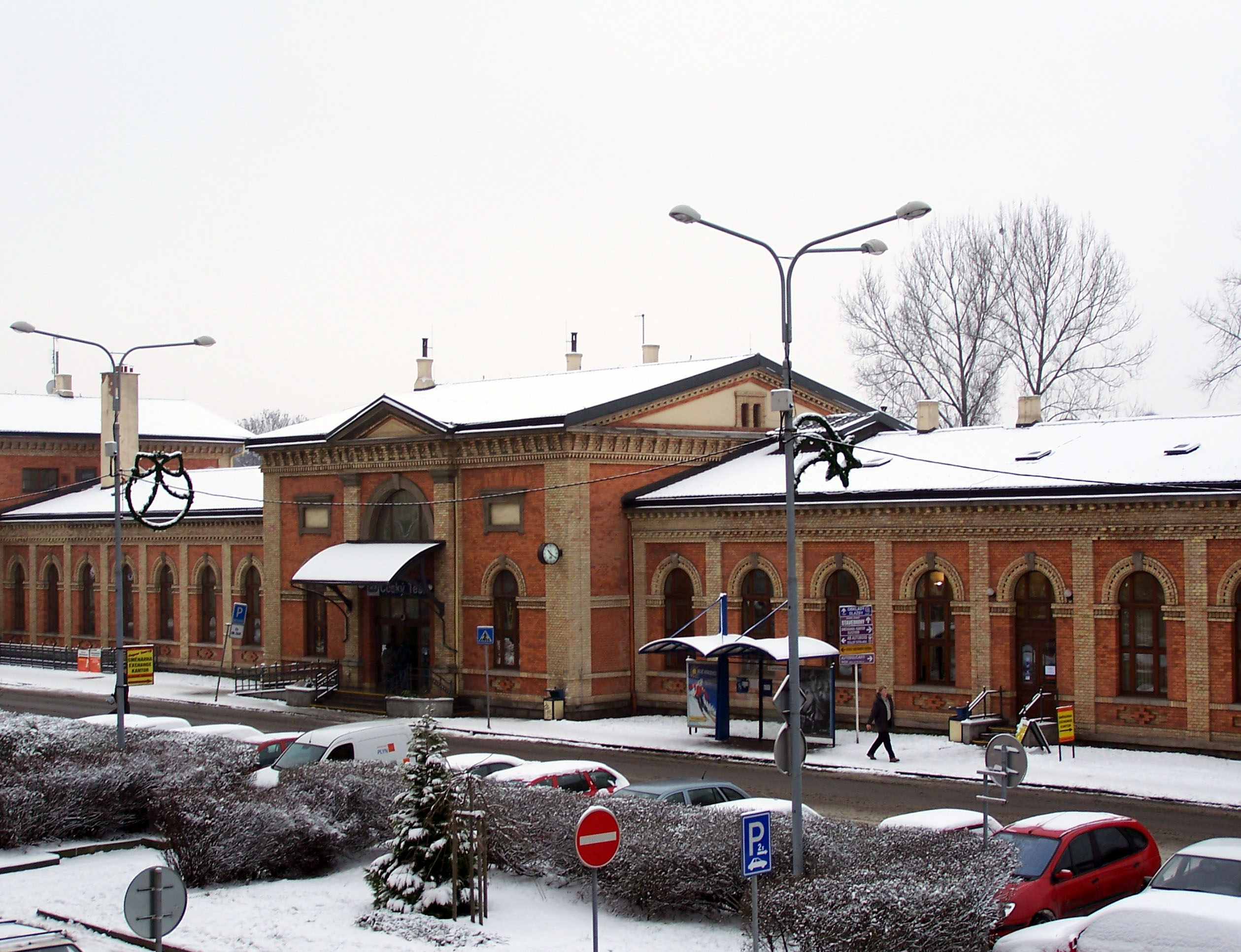
Český Těšín railway station

The Košice–Bohumín Railway (Czech: Košicko-bohumínská dráha, Slovak: Košicko-bohumínska železnica, Polish: Kolej koszycko-bogumińska, German: Kaschau-Oderberger Bahn, Hungarian: Kassa-Oderbergi Vasút) can refer to:

- originally: A private railway company established in 1869 in Austria-Hungary. In 1924 the company was nationalised and put under the Czechoslovak State Railways.
- nowadays: The main track of this company (between Košice and Bohumín). The Košice-Bohumín track connected the industrial area of Silesia with the city of Košice in what is now eastern Slovakia. It was completed in 1872.

== Tracks of the company ==
- Košice – Bohumín (350 km, construction started in 1869, completed in 1869–1872), including:
  - Bohumín – Český Těšín completed on 5 May 1869
  - Český Těšín – Žilina completed on 8 January 1871
  - Žilina – Poprad completed on 8 December 1871
  - Poprad – Spišská Nová Ves completed on 12 December 1871
  - Spišská Nová Ves – Kysak completed on 12 March 1872
  - (Košice) – Kysak – Prešov (completed on 1 September 1870)
- Štrbské Pleso–Štrba rack railway (gauge 1000 mm, completed in 1896)
- Tatra Electric Railway (gauge 1000 mm, completed in 1912)
