= Railways of the Slovak Republic =

Železnice Slovenskej republiky
- Type: state-owned enterprise
- Industry: Transport
- Founded: 1993
- Headquarters: Bratislava, Slovakia
- Key people: Ing. Štefan Hlinka (CEO) and Mgr. Juraj Mravčák (Chairman of Board of Directors)
- Products: network infrastructure services
- Revenue: ▲€509.3 million (2019); ▲€495.6 million (2018); ▼€466 million (2017)
- Net income: ▼€−2.3 million; ▲€172 thousand (2018); ▼€102 thousand (2017)
- Total assets: ▲€102 thousand (2019); ▲€3.610 billion (2018); ▼€3.717billion (2017)
- Number of employees: ▲13,716 (2019); ▼13,665 (2018); ▼13,781 (2017)
- Website: www.zsr.sk

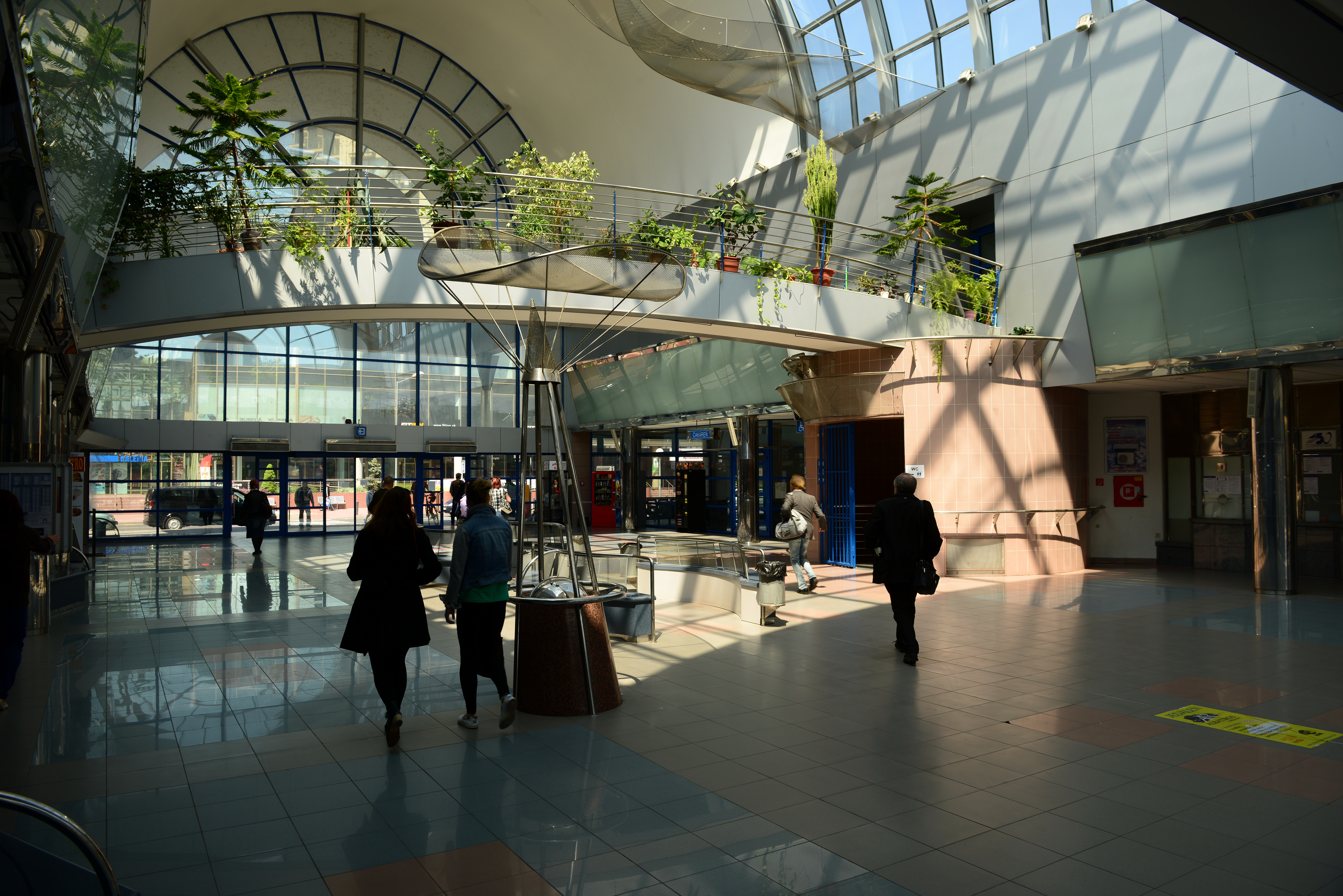
Bratislava-Petržalka railway station

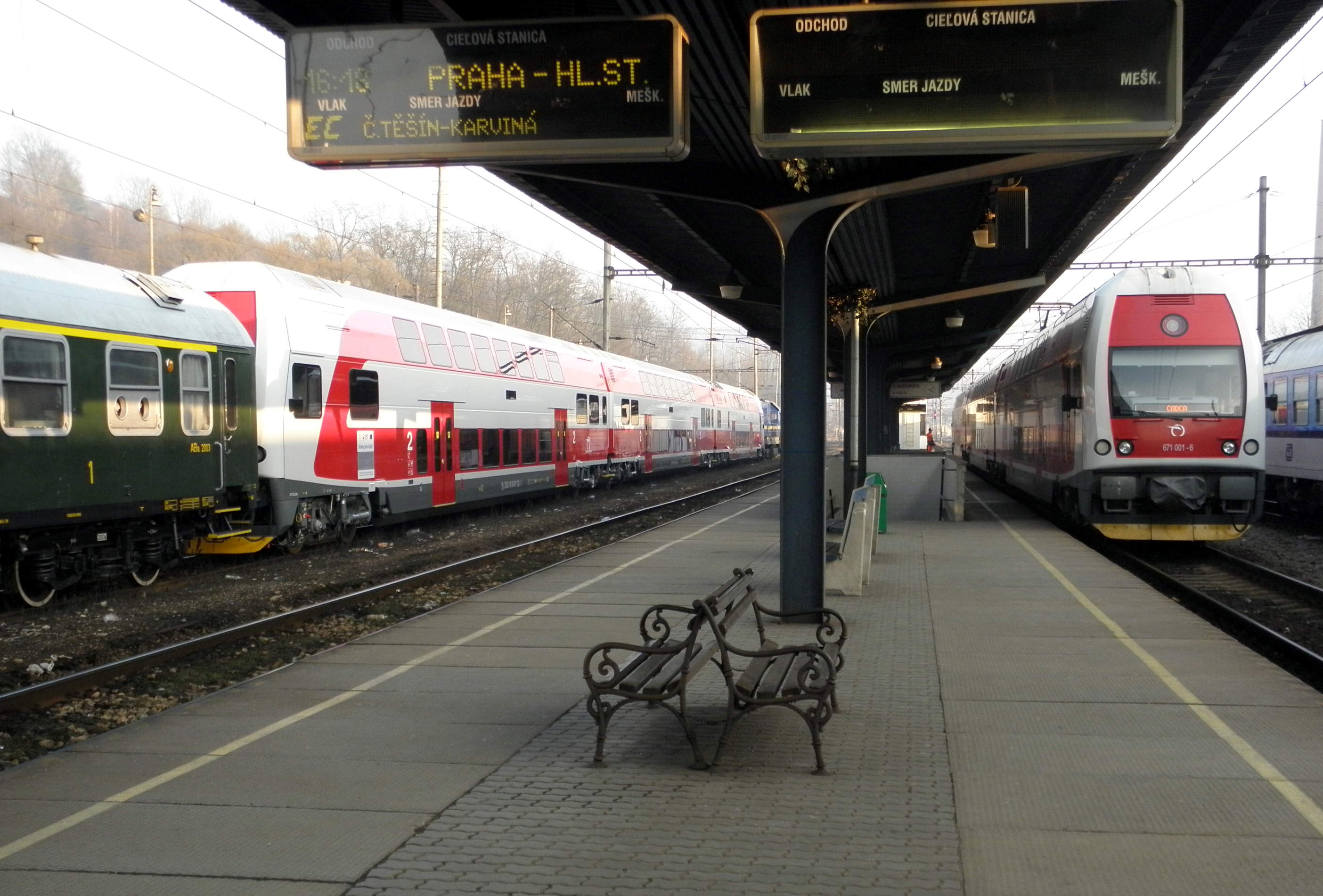
Čadca railway station

Railways of the Slovak Republic (Slovak: Železnice Slovenskej republiky, acronym: ŽSR) is the state-owned railway infrastructure company of Slovakia.

The company was established in 1993 as the successor to the Czechoslovak State Railways (Slovak: Česko-slovenské štátne dráhy) in Slovakia following the dissolution of Czechoslovakia. It had a formal monopoly on railroad transportation in Slovakia until 1996, and while other rail transport companies have since been allowed to operate in the country – for example, RegioJet, a private provider, has been operating passenger rail lines since 2012 – , it has retained a de facto monopoly.

In 2002, the Slovak parliament passed a law dividing the company. ŽSR was tasked with infrastructure maintenance, while passenger and freight transport was moved to Železničná spoločnosť. In 2005, this new company was further split into Železničná spoločnosť Slovensko, which provides passenger services, and Železničná spoločnosť Cargo Slovakia, which provides freight services.

== Bodies ==
The governing bodies of ŽSR are the Management Board and General Director.

=== Management board of ŽSR ===
The Management Board is the top body of the railways. It has nine members—six members of them are experts from the transport sector, finance, banking, economics and law, three are elected as representatives of the railway employees. Board members are appointed and dismissed by the Minister of Transport, Posts and Telecommunications of the Slovak Republic, three of them are appointed and dismissed by the proposal based on the election of the employees.

The office of the Management Board of ŽSR provides administrative and technical operations. General inspection SR ŽSR performs inspection and control of organizational units of ŽSR and provides tasks associated with improvement of the management system and compliance with legislative regulation, monitors implementation of decisions of ŽSR and gives suggestions for their implementation.

=== General director ===
The general director manages the activities of ŽSR and is responsible for its performance and the results to the Management Board. The general director is a statutory body of ŽSR. He represents the company externally and is acting on its behalf in all matters except the matters that are in the exclusive competence of the Management Board or the Ministry of Transport, Posts and Telecommunications.

The general director is represented by four agents responsible for specific departments of ŽSR. The general director is appointed and dismissed by the Minister of Transport, Posts and Telecommunications.

=== Deputies of General Director ===
The general director manages the Department of Director General and has four deputies who are in charge of handling the activity in other departments. Sections and branches associated with the departments are subject to the deputy.

== Organizational structure ==
Railways of Slovak Republic is further divided into Headquarters and Management and maintenance of railway infrastructure.

=== Headquarters ===
Departments of Director General:

- Department of Deputy Director General for Development and IT
- Department of Deputy Director General for Economy
- Department of Deputy Director General for Operation
- Department of Deputy Director General for Human Resources

All departments are located in the capital city, Bratislava.

=== Management and maintenance of railway infrastructure ===
==== Management of railway infrastructure ====
This section has two local departments. The first one is situated on the West of the Slovak Republic in Trnava and the second location is on the East of the Slovak Republic in Košice.

==== Maintenance of railway infrastructure ====
Maintenance of railway infrastructure is divided into two regional headquarters and two divisions.

- Regional Headquarters in the locality of Zvolen
- Regional Headquarters in the locality of Žilina
- Bridge Division in Košice
- Bridge Division in Bratislava

== Representation abroad ==
Railways of Slovak Republic are represented in international organizations in Brussels, Belgium and Warsaw, Poland.

- CER - Community of European Railway; Brussels, Belgium
- OSJD – Organization for Cooperation of Railways; Warsaw, Poland

== Passenger transport ==
Detailed information about pricing is published on the websites of individual companies providing passenger transport:

- Železničná spoločnosť Slovensko, a. s. (ZSSK)
- RegioJet (RJ)
- Leo Express ( LE)

== See also ==
- Rail transport in Slovakia
- Railway gauges in Slovakia
- Slovenská strela
- Transport in Slovakia
- Uzhhorod - Košice broad gauge track
- Bujanov Tunnel
- Harmanec Tunnel
- Tatra Electric Railway
