= ZSSK Class 425.95 =

Class of electric trains in Slovakia

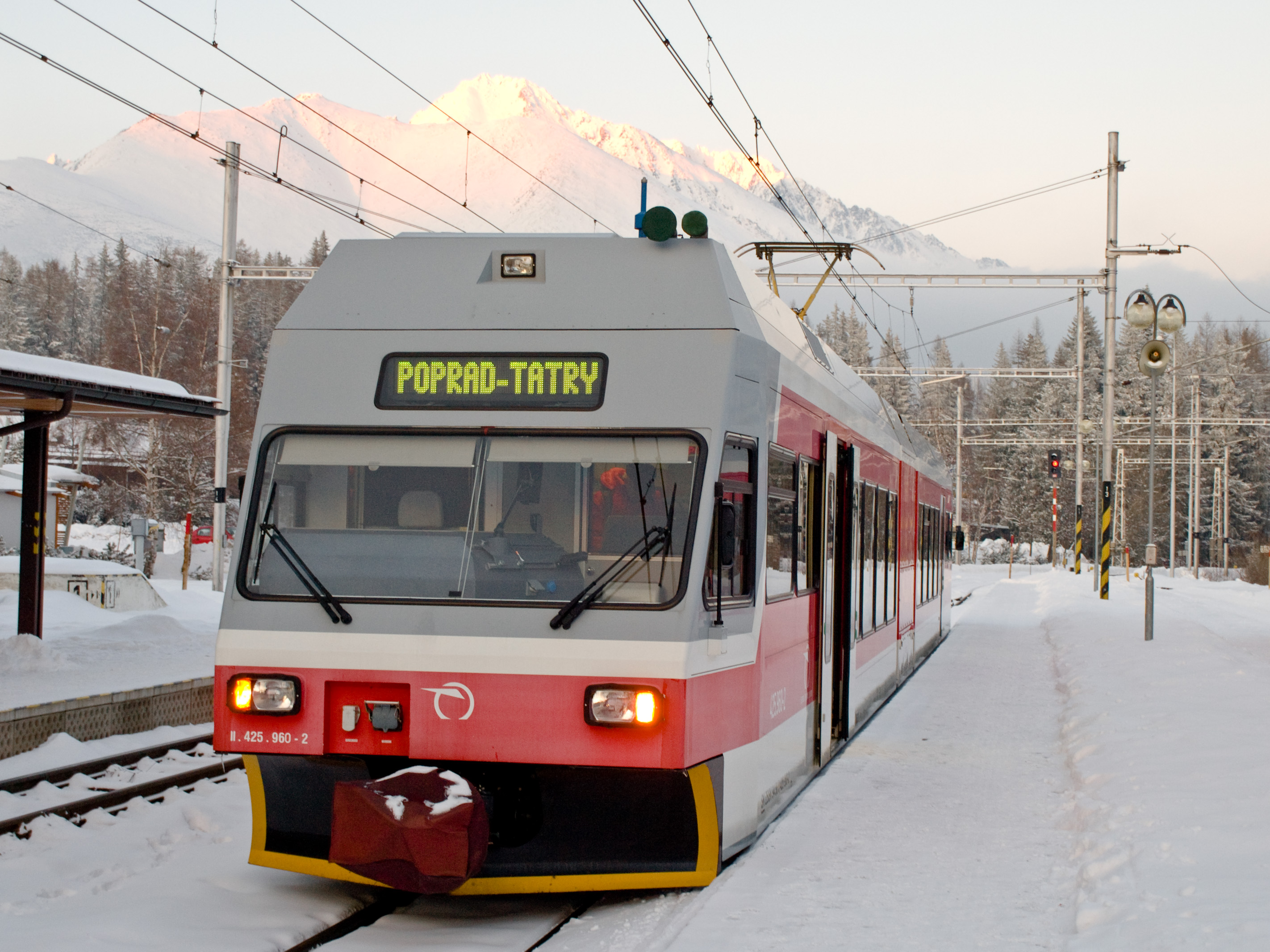
- A class 425.95 train at Štrbské Pleso, 2010.

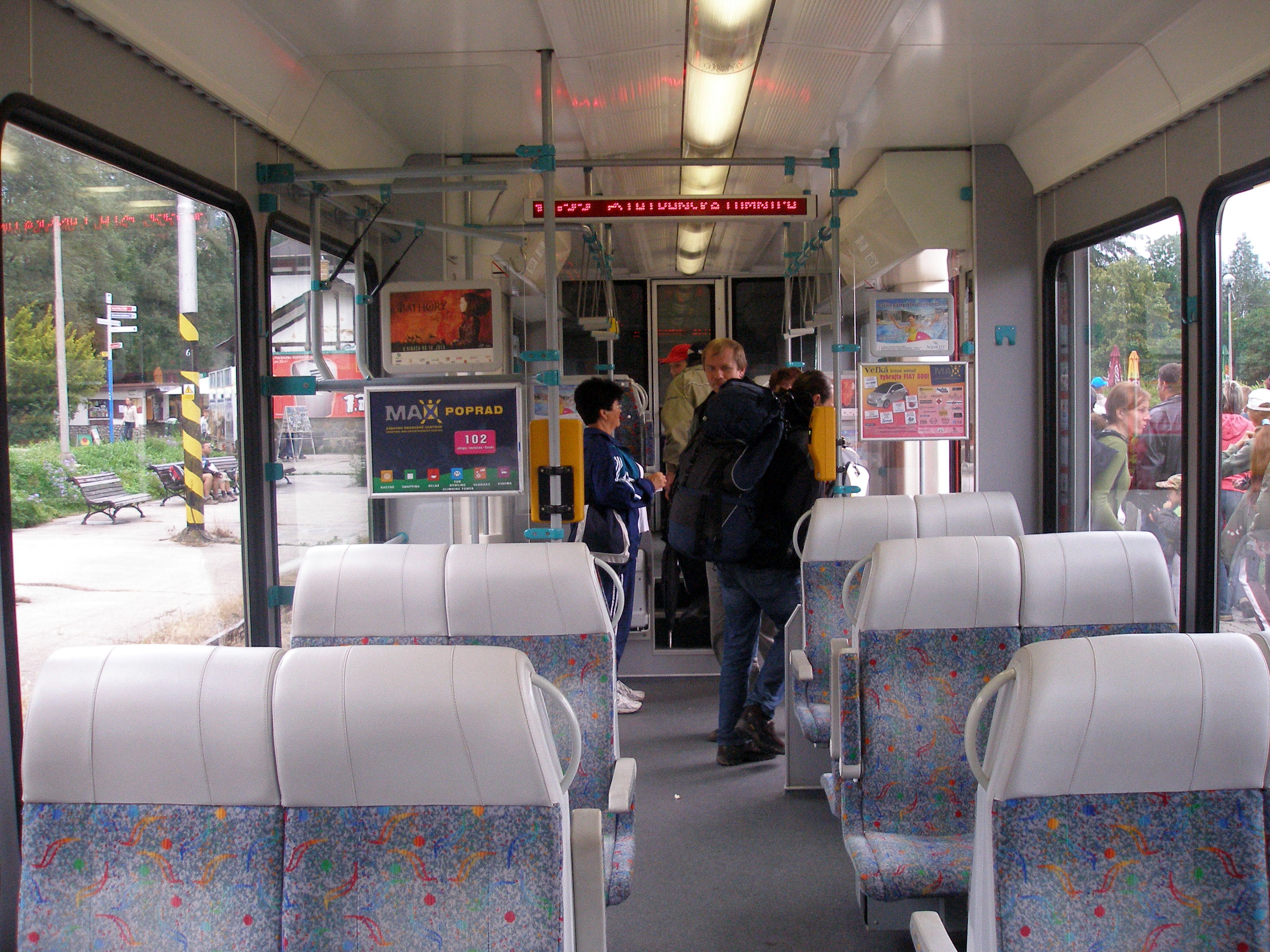
- Passengers alighting at Tatranská Lomnica.
- Manufacturers: ŽOS Vrútky; Stadler Rail; Adtranz
- Family name: Stadler GTW
- Replaced: ŽSR Class 420.95
- Constructed: 2000 prototype 2001–2006 series
- Entered service: 2000
- Number built: 15
- Number in service: 15
- Fleet numbers: 425.951–425.965
- Capacity: 108 seated 92 standing
- Operator: ZSSK
- Depot: Poprad-Tatry
- Line served: Tatra Electric Railway (TEŽ)

Specifications
- Train length: 32,984 mm (108 ft 2.6 in)
- Width: 2,700 mm (8 ft 10 in)
- Height: 3,500 mm (11 ft 6 in)
- Articulated sections: 3
- Maximum speed: 80 km/h (50 mph)
- Weight: 38.0 t (83,800 lb)
- Power output: 320 kW (430 hp)
- Acceleration: 1.0 m/s²
- Electric system: 1.5 kV DC
- Current collection: Pantograph
- UIC classification: 2'Bo'2'
- Track gauge: 1,000 mm (3 ft 3 3/8 in) metre gauge

The ZSSK Class 425.95, is a class of metre gauge electric articulated trains currently operating on the Tatra Electric Railway (TEŽ), in the Prešov Region of northeastern Slovakia. They are part of the Stadler GTW family of rail vehicles, developed by Stadler Rail.

Due to their boxy shape, and angled cab ends, the members of the class have been nicknamed "Tetrapaks".

== Background ==
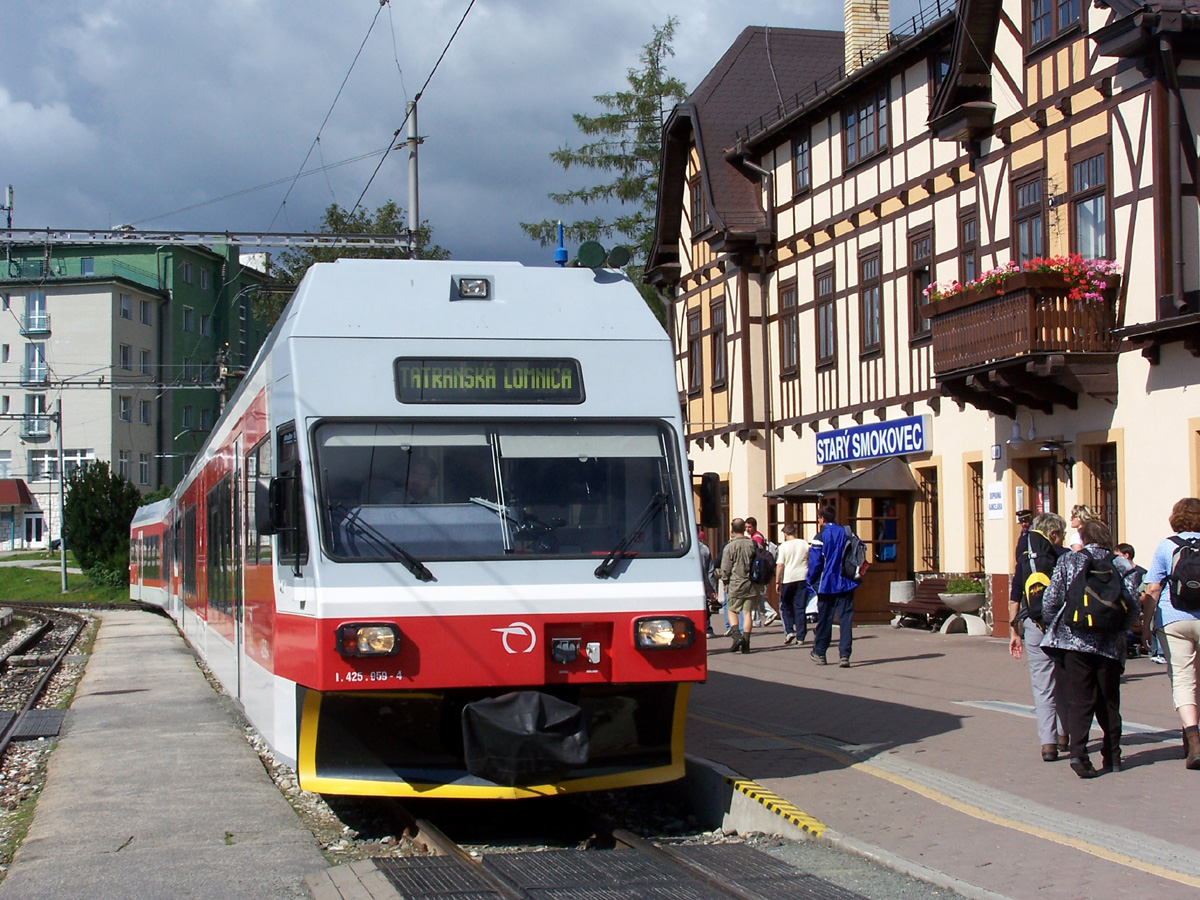
A Class 425.95 train at Starý Smokovec, Summer 2006.

The TEŽ is a 35 km (22 mi) long line connecting Poprad-Tatry railway station, on the standard gauge Košice–Bohumín Railway, with a number of ski, tourist, and health resorts in the nearby High Tatras.

Opened in 1908, the line was completely refurbished in the late 1960s, and is now operated by the Železničná spoločnosť Slovensko (English: Railway Corporation of Slovakia) (ZSSK).

By the end of the twentieth century, the ČSD Class EMU 89.0 multiple units, which had entered service on the TEŽ as an integral part of the 1960s refurbishment, had reached the end of their working lives.

The fifteen members of the ZSSK Class 425.95 were gradually introduced from 2000 to replace them, and now operate all TEŽ services.

== Technical details ==
The tender for the supply of 14 units was won by a consortium, GTW High Tatras, which had been formed by the companies ŽOS Vrútky, Stadler Rail and Daimler-Chrysler Rail Systems. The design of the class was based upon that of the Stadler GTW 2/6. The overall assembly of the class members was carried out by ŽOS Vrútky.

Each unit is made up of three sections. The middle section, with a carbody made of steel, is fitted with electrical equipment and traction motors driving a twin axle bogie. Each of the lightweight outer sections, made of aluminium, has a passenger compartment, a driver's workstation, and an unpowered twin axle bogie. The three sections are connected together by steel-rubber joints.

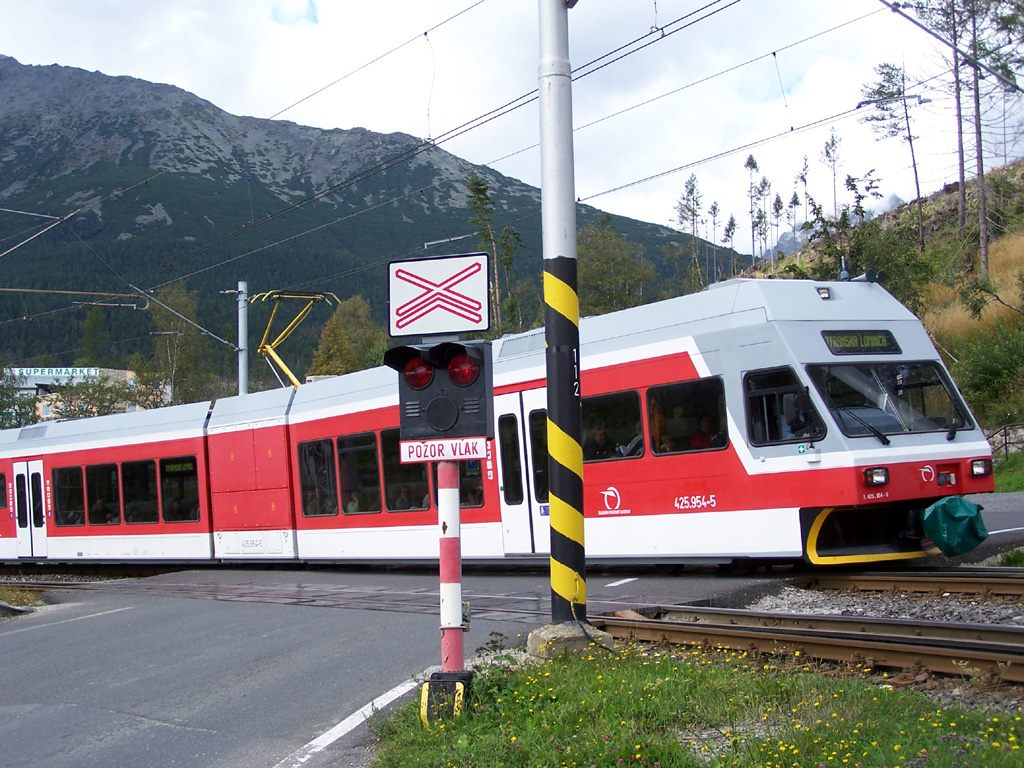
A Class 425.95 train in the mountains, Summer 2006.

The roof of the middle section is equipped with an electrically controlled pantograph to collect DC current. Each drive axle in the middle bogie is powered by a three-phase asynchronous motor, fed by an inverter changing the DC power supply to AC.

All units have four braking systems - electro-operating regenerative brakes and an electromagnetic brake on the drive chassis and an electro-mechanical brake and a spring parking brake on all axles. Air suspension is used to minimize the transmission of vibration from the chassis to the passenger compartment.

Each outer section is fitted with electrically driven double-leaf doors, operated by on-demand controls. In the boarding area inside the doors, there are outboard folding seats, 10 holders for skis or bicycles, and handles for standing passengers.

The portions of the outer sections between the boarding areas and the driver's compartments have an elevated floor, accessible from the boarding areas by stairs. The portions between the boarding areas and the middle section have low floors. The upholstered passenger seats in all parts of the passenger compartments are arranged in a 2 + 2 configuration with a middle aisle. On each side of these compartments are large windows with tinted double glazing.

The driver's workstations are separated from the passenger compartments by partly glazed partitions and all glass doors.

In normal use, the passenger compartments are ventilated by microprocessor controlled ceiling ducts. Emergency ventilation can be achieved by tilting open the upper parts of some of the side windows. Heating elements are fitted to the sidewalls. Interior lighting is provided by fluorescent lamps, and the passenger compartments also have visual information systems, with multilingual acoustic stop announcements. All members of the class have been liveried since new in a red, white and grey design.

== Service history ==
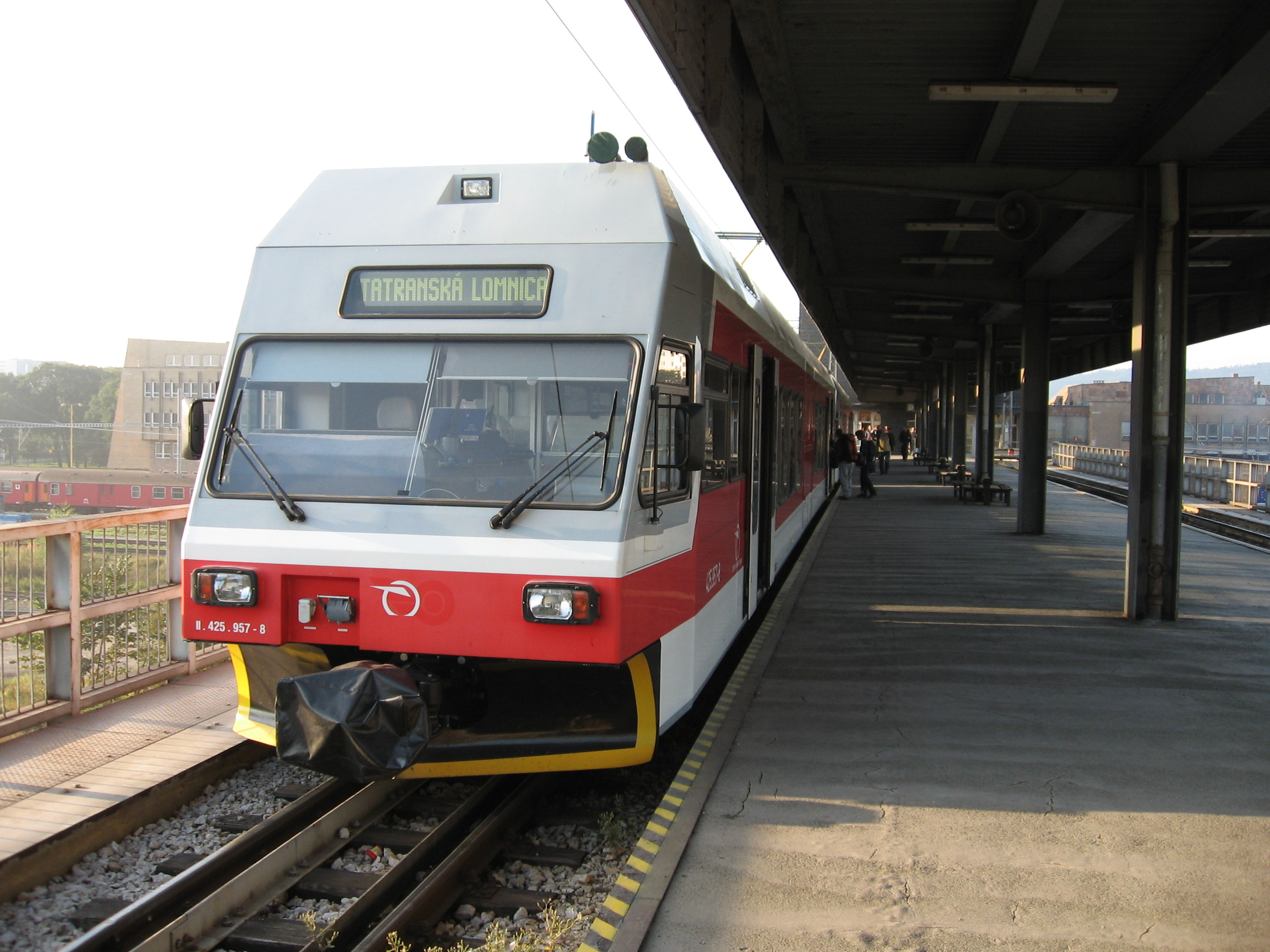
A Class 425.95 train at Poprad-Tatry, Summer 2006.

The first member of the class arrived at Poprad in mid-October 2000, after being displayed at the International Engineering Fair in Brno. On 19 October 2000, it made its first trip on the TEŽ, an unpowered run to Starý Smokovec behind a Class EMU 89.0. Between November 2000 and March 2001, the class leader, numbered 425.951, underwent testing on the network. It then operated trial runs with passengers.

The testing process revealed certain incompatibilities between modern vehicles and the TEŽ's then outdated track and power systems. The latter therefore required some conversion work, including reprofiling of the lines in some sections, reconstruction of the platforms across the network, and also adjustments to the power system to enable it to benefit from the new vehicles' regenerative brakes. Eventually the class leader completed the tests and entered regular service.

In 2001–2002, a total of 13 further units and one spare middle section were delivered. They gradually replaced the Class EMU 89.0 units, which were progressively retired. However, the total capacity of the new units proved to be somewhat inadequate, given that only 14 units had replaced 18 predecessors. In 2006, therefore, some of the Class EMU 89.0 units were returned to service to supplement the new units. The same year, two additional class 425.95 outer sections were acquired, and combined with the spare section to make up a fifteenth unit.

The class 425.95s are also capable of multiple unit operation in pairs.

The individual units are numbered as 425 951 to 425.965.

== See also ==
- Štrbské Pleso – Štrba rack railway
- ČSD Class EMU 29.0
