= Starý Smokovec railway station =

Railway station in Starý Smokovec, Slovakia

Starý Smokovec
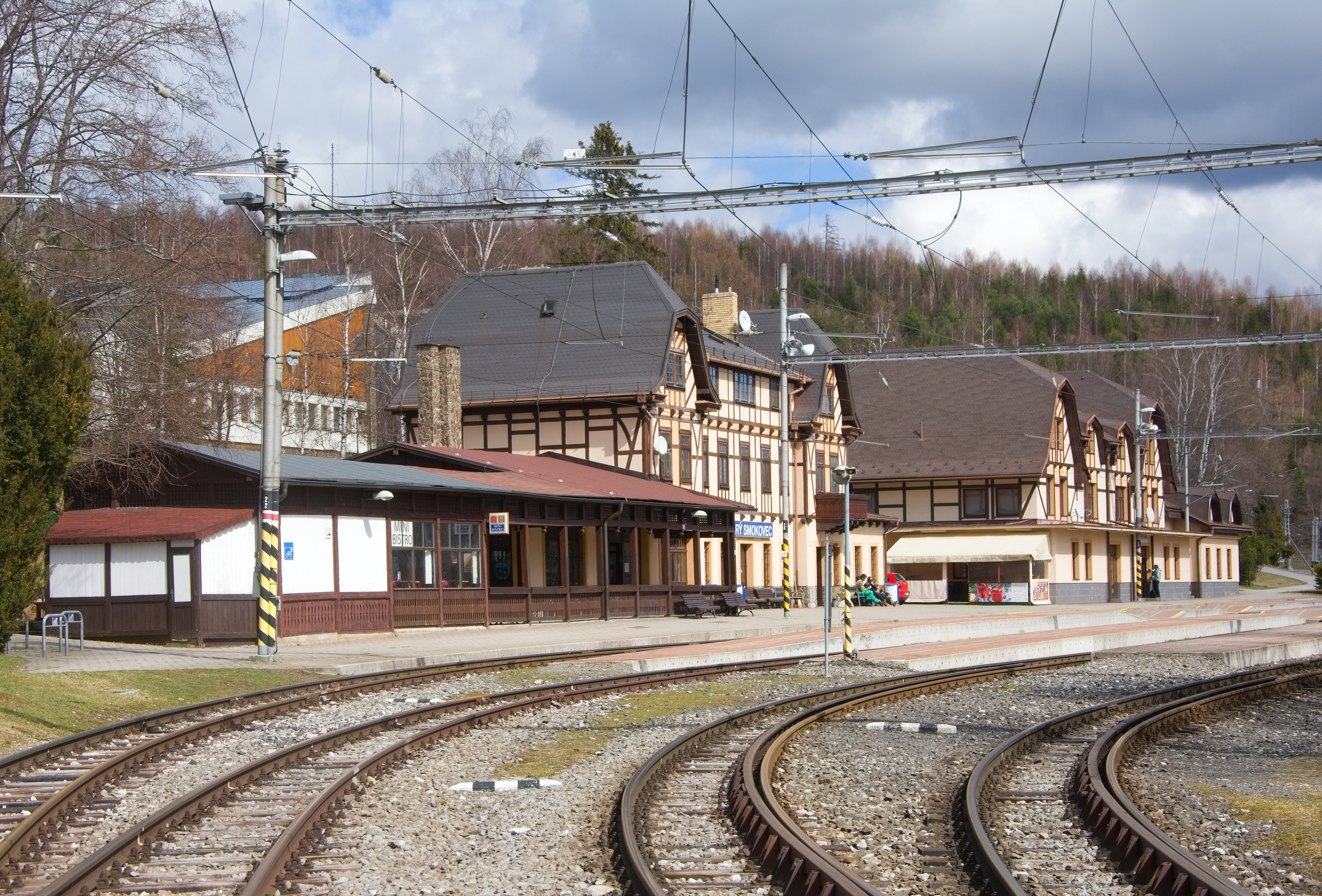
- The station building

General information
- Location: Stary Smokovec 5/30; 06201 Starý Smokovec; Vysoké Tatry; Poprad District; Prešov Region; Slovakia
- Coordinates: 49°08′21″N 20°13′21″E
- Elevation: 1,355 m (4,446 ft)
- Owner: Železnice Slovenskej republiky (ŽSR)
- Operator: Železnice Slovenskej republiky
- Lines: 183 Poprad-Tatry–Štrbské Pleso; 184 Starý Smokovec–Tatranská Lomnica (Tatra Electric Railway (TEŽ))
- Distance: 19.4 km (12.1 mi) from Poprad-Tatry

History
- Opened: 17 December 1908
Location
- Location within Slovakia

Starý Smokovec railway station (Slovak: Železničná stanica Starý Smokovec) is a junction station in the High Tatras. It serves the ski, tourist and health resort of Starý Smokovec, in the Prešov Region, northeastern Slovakia.

Opened in 1908, the station is the focal point of the metre gauge Tatra Electric Railway (TEŽ). It forms the junction between the TEŽ's Poprad-Tatry–Štrbské Pleso main line and its only other line, the Starý Smokovec–Tatranská Lomnica branch.

The station is currently owned by Železnice Slovenskej republiky (ŽSR); train services are operated by Železničná spoločnosť Slovensko (ZSSK).

== Location ==
Starý Smokovec railway station is right in the heart of Starý Smokovec, which forms part of the town of Vysoké Tatry, a conglomerate of separate and different settlements (originally separate villages). The only common feature of the Vysoké Tatry settlements is that they are the main tourist resorts in the Slovak High Tatras, connected through a common railway network, the TEŽ. After the country's capital, Vysoké Tatry is Slovakia's major tourist destination.

== History ==
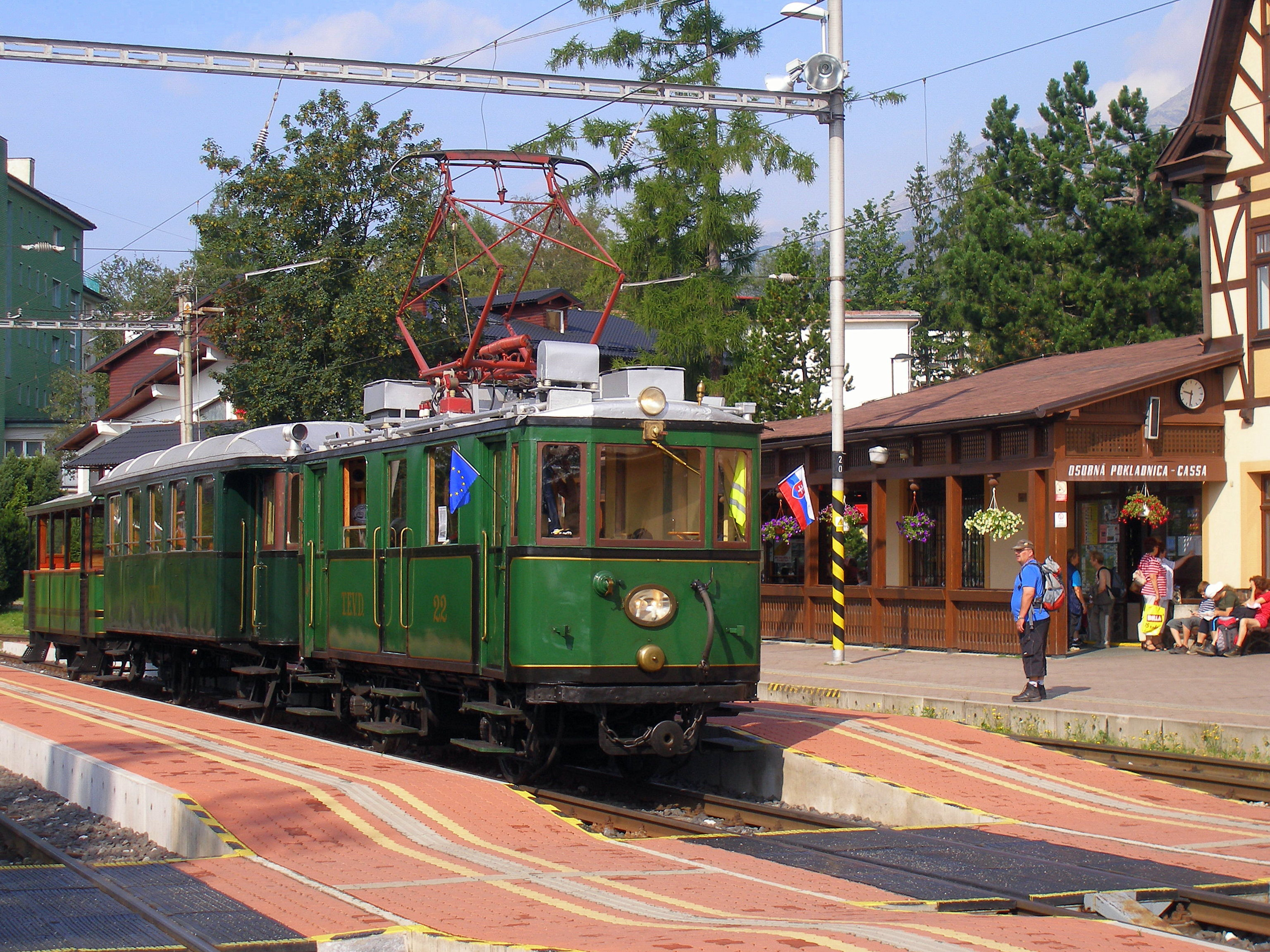
A heritage train at the station, 2010.

The station was opened on 17 December 1908, together with the rest of the TEŽ's 19.4 km (12.1 mi) first stage, between Poprad-Tatry and Starý Smokovec.

On 16 December 1911, Starý Smokovec became a temporary switchback station, with the opening of the 6 km (3.7 mi) branch between Starý Smokovec and Tatranská Lomnica.

The station was finally transformed into a junction station on 13 August 1912, when the rest of the TEŽ's main line was completed between Starý Smokovec and Štrbské Pleso.

== Facilities ==
The station building is an attractive three-storey building of half timbered design. It houses information and ticketing facilities, and a restaurant.

== Train services ==
Starý Smokovec railway station is the junction of the following High Tatras railway lines:

- Line 183: Poprad-Tatry–Štrbské Pleso (TEŽ's main line)
- Line 184: Starý Smokovec–Tatranská Lomnica

== Interchange ==
The station offers interchange with local buses.

== Services ==
| Preceding station | ŽSSK | Following station |
|---|---|---|
| Nový Smokovec toward Štrbské Pleso | Stopping trains Tatra Electric Railway | Dolný Smokovec toward Poprad-Tatry |
| Terminus | Stopping trains Tatra Electric Railway | Pekná Vyhliadka toward Tatranská Lomnica |

== See also ==
- History of rail transport in Slovakia
- Rail transport in Slovakia
