= Starý Smokovec =

Part of the town of Vysoké Tatry in Slovakia

Coordinates: 49°08.5′N 20°13.5′E

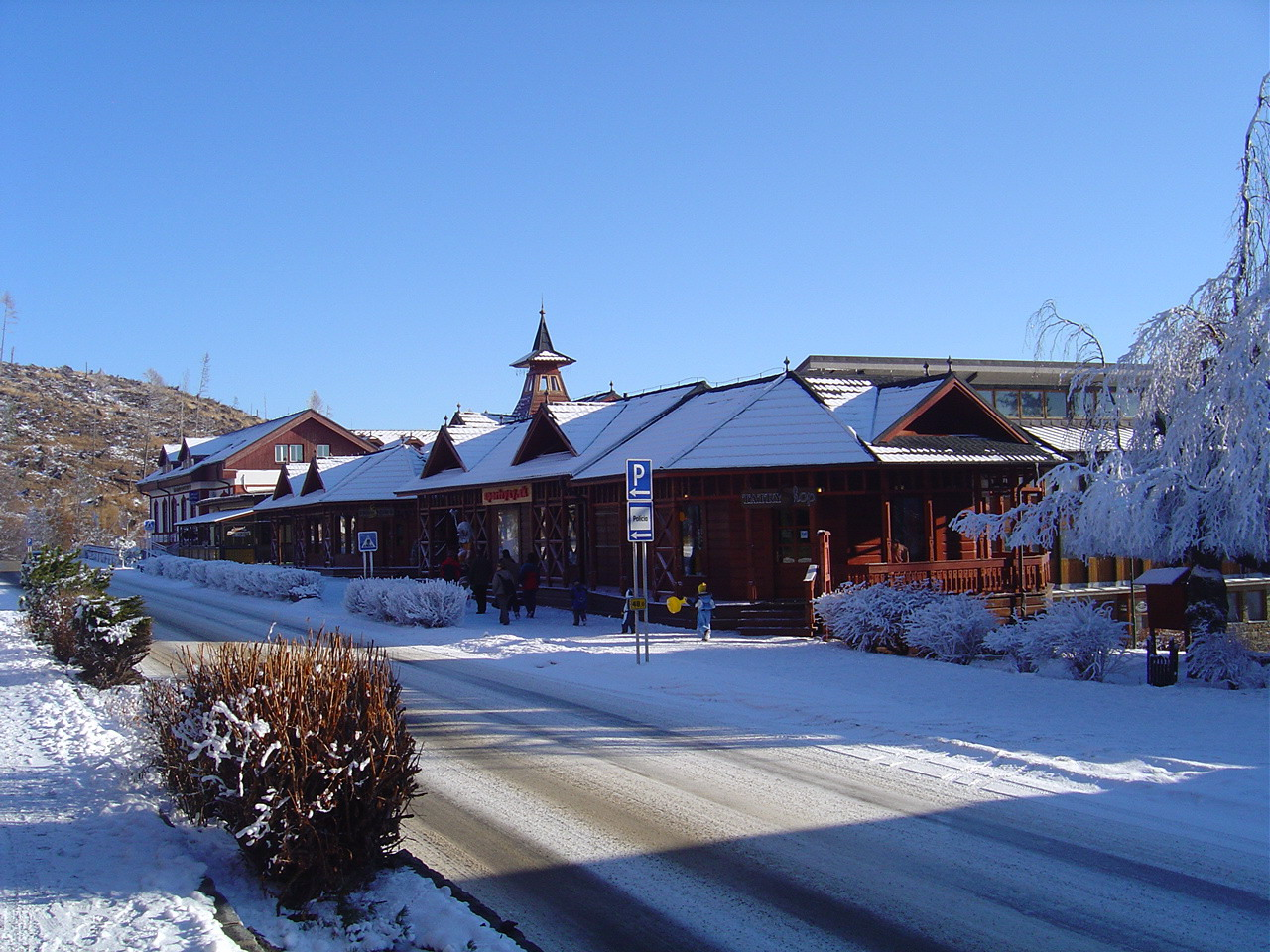
The central district of Starý Smokovec

Starý Smokovec (Slovak pronunciation: [ˈstari: ˈsmɔkɔvet͡s]; German: Altschmecks; Hungarian: Ótátrafüred; Polish: Stary Smokowiec) is a part of the town of Vysoké Tatry in northern Slovakia in the Tatras.

Starý Smokovec is a popular resort for skiing and hiking. It also forms the junction of the Tatra Electric Railway train line, connecting Poprad, Tatranská Lomnica and Štrbské Pleso.

Amongst the more important buildings in the district are the sanatorium and the Grand Hotel (established in 1904). It is connected by the Starý Smokovec–Hrebienok funicular to the small ski resort of Hrebienok at 1285 m.

== Rail transport ==
Lines: 183, 184

== Gallery ==
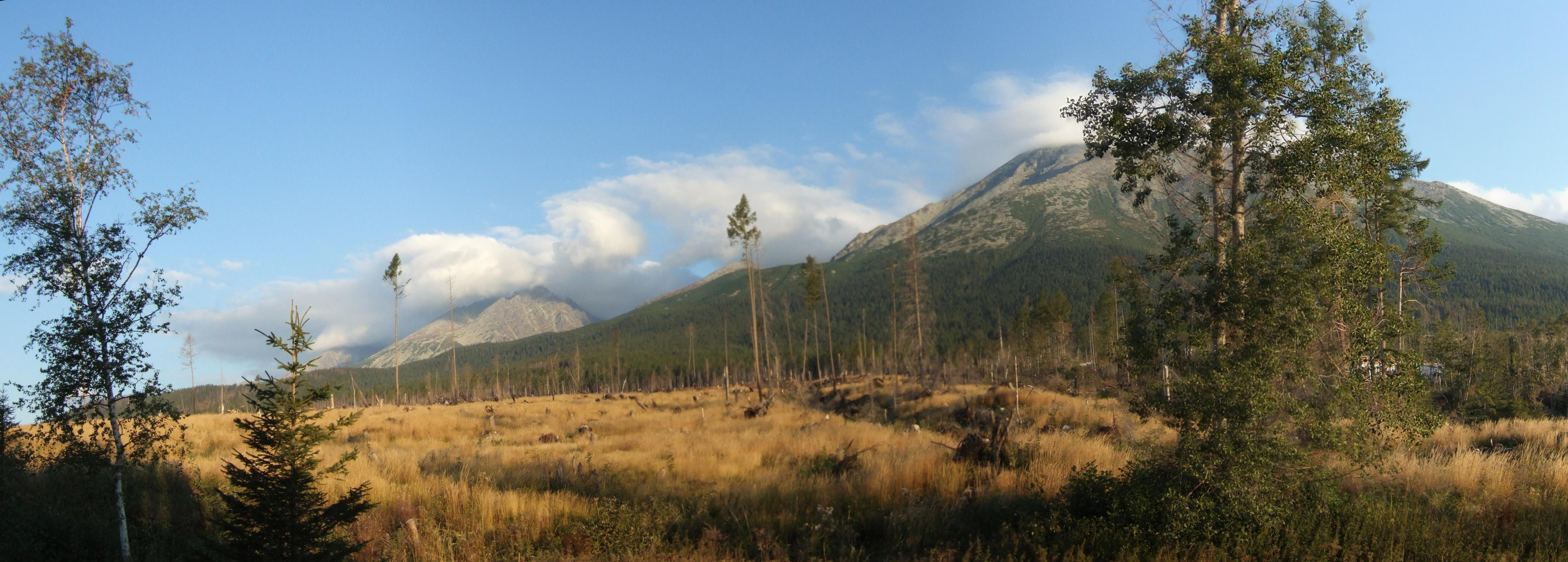
A view of the Tatra mountains from the northwest of the town. The large peak to the right is Slavkovský štít

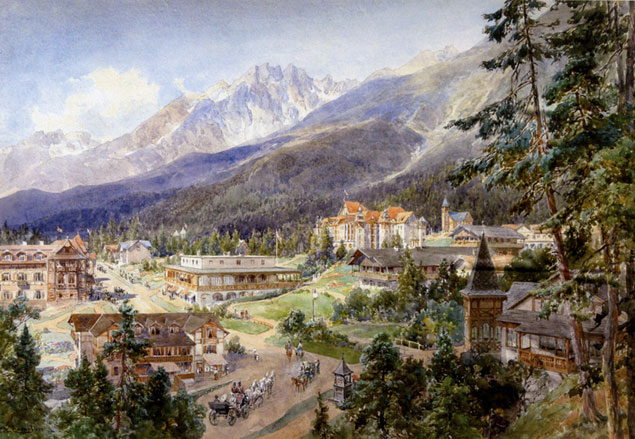
A watercolor painting of the town in 1890.

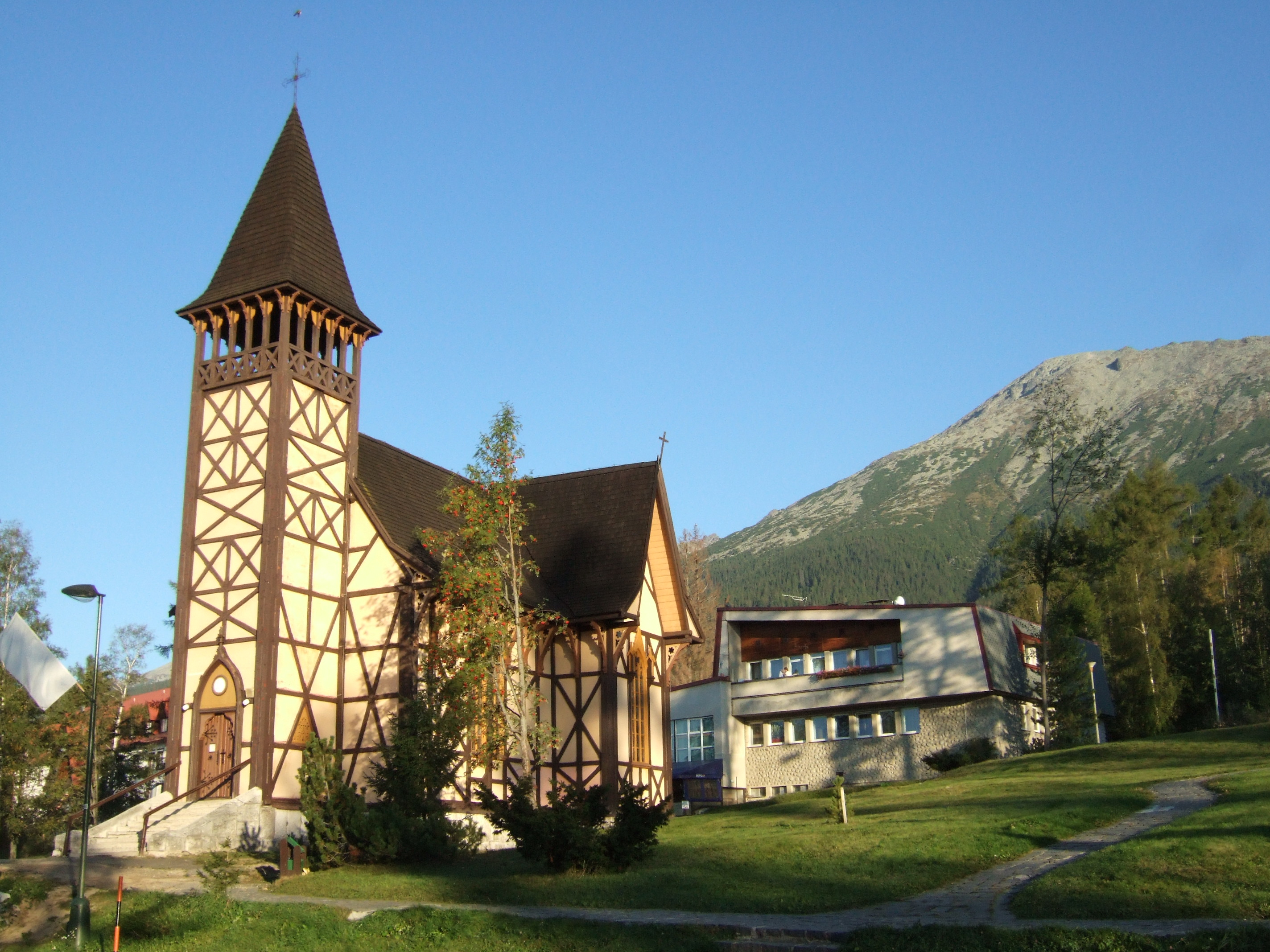
A church in Starý Smokovec

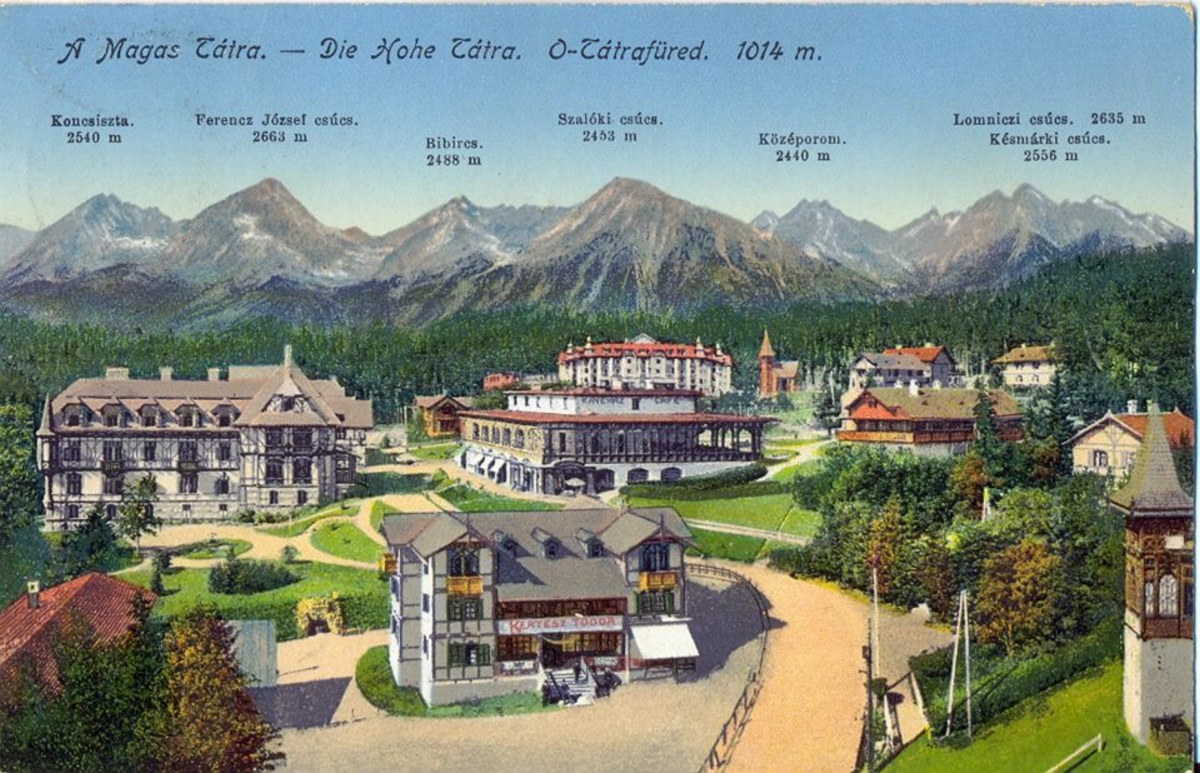
View over the town from an old book (year unknown)
