= ČSD Class EMU 89.0 =

ČSD Class EMU 89.0 ŽSR Class 420.95
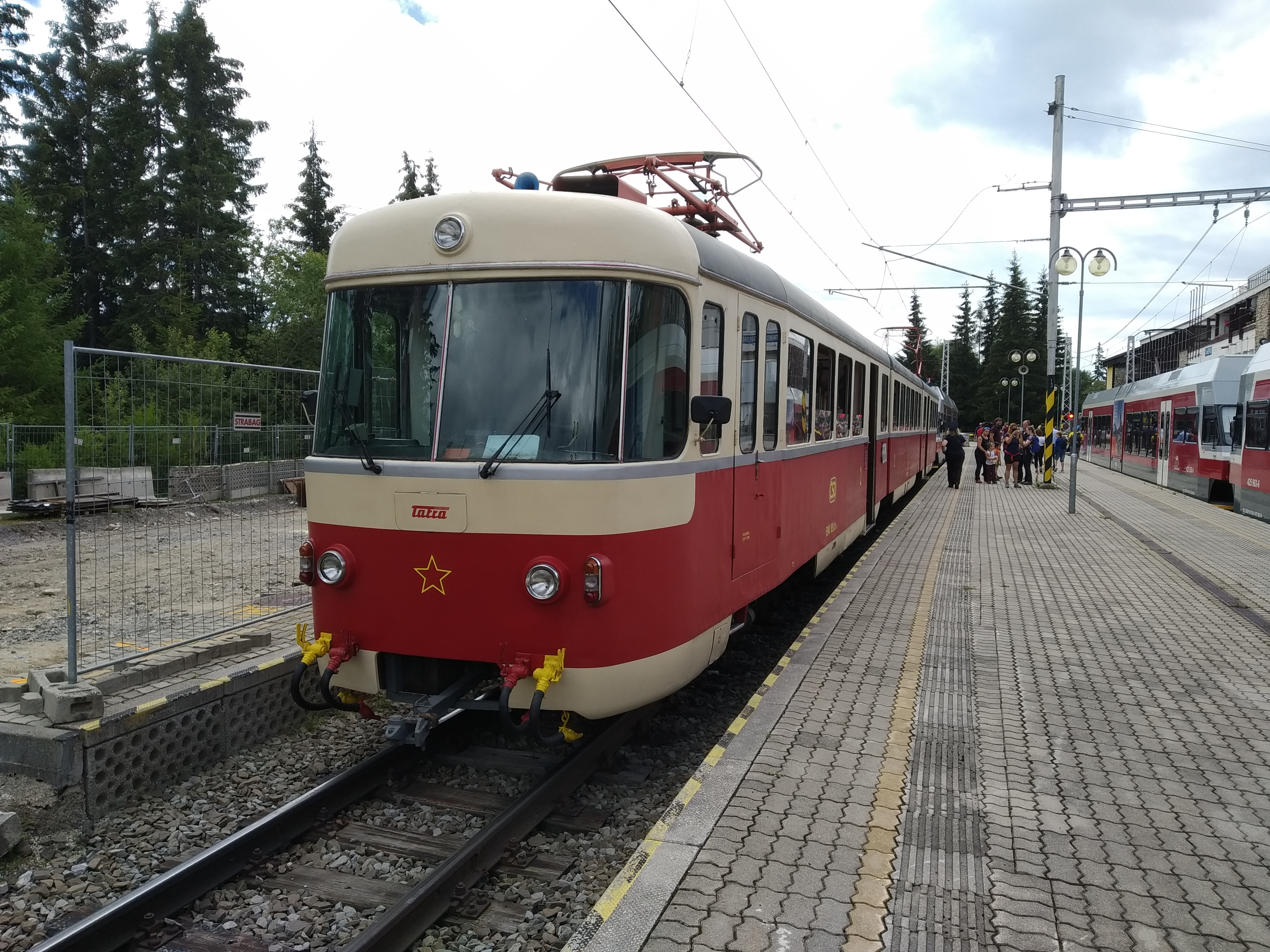
- A class 420.95 at Štrbské Pleso railway station, 2020.
- In service: 1965–2002
- Manufacturer: ČKD Tatra
- Built at: Smíchov
- Replaced: Various EMU classes
- Constructed: 1965 prototype 1968–1970 series
- Entered service: 1965
- Scrapped: 2001–2002
- Number built: 18
- Number preserved: 1
- Number scrapped: 14
- Fleet numbers: ČSD EMU 89.001-018; ŽSR 420.952-968
- Capacity: 120 + 14 seated 156 standing
- Operators: ČSD to 1992; ŽSR from 1993
- Depots: Poprad
- Lines served: Tatra Electric Railway

Specifications
- Car body construction: Steel
- Train length: 37,534 mm (123 ft 1.7 in)
- Articulated sections: 3
- Maximum speed: 50 km/h (31 mph)
- Weight: 47.4 t (46.7 long tons; 52.2 short tons)
- Power output: 320 kW (430 hp)
- Electric system(s): 1.5 kV DC
- Current collection: Pantograph
- UIC classification: Bo'Bo'Bo'Bo'
- Bogies: Jacobs
- Track gauge: 1,000 mm (3 ft 3 3/8 in) metre gauge

The former ČSD Class EMU 89.0, later known as the ŽSR Class 420.95, was a class of metre gauge electric multiple units operated from the late 1960s until 2001-2002, on the Tatra Electric Railway (TEŽ), in the Prešov Region of northeastern Slovakia.

== The introduction of the class ==
The TEŽ is a small network of railway lines totalling 35 kilometres (22 mi) in length. It connects Poprad-Tatry railway station, on the standard gauge Košice–Bohumín Railway, with a number of ski, tourist, and health resorts in the nearby High Tatras. Opened in 1908, the TEŽ had become so run down by the early 1960s that it needed extensive reconstruction, to meet the requirements of its growing tourist traffic. The work required went beyond the renewal of tracks and equipment, and included the procurement of new vehicles.

Between 1964 and 1970, the TEŽ was therefore completely refurbished, in preparation for the FIS Nordic World Ski Championships 1970, which were held in the area. The class EMU 89.0 vehicles entered service on the TEŽ between 1965 and 1969 as an integral part of the refurbishment. They replaced an obsolete fleet of vehicles, of classes EMU 25.0, EMU 26.0, EMU 28.0, EMU 48.0 and EMU 49.0. The oldest of these obsolete vehicles had entered service in 1912, and the youngest in 1956.

== Technical details ==
All members of the class were designed and built by ČKD Tatra, then one of the world's leading manufacturers of trams.

The prototype vehicle, assembled at ČKD Tatra's factory in Smíchov, Prague, was completed in 1965. Its design was derived largely from that of the then current Tatra T2 and T3 type standard trams, and K2 type articulated trams.

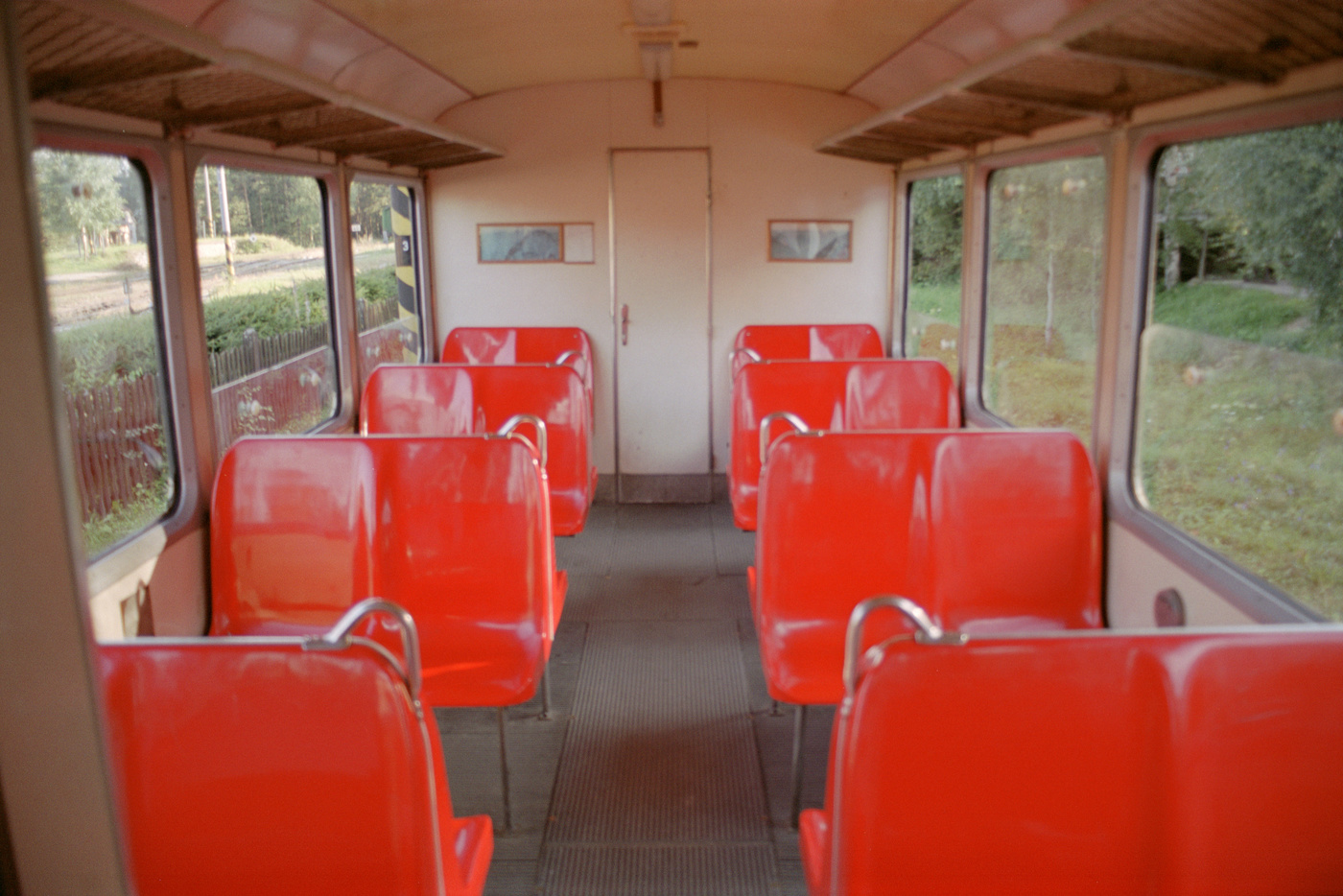
Interior view, 2000.

The series vehicles, 17 in number and introduced between 1968 and 1970, were virtually identical to the prototype in their external appearance.

Each class EMU 89.0 unit consisted of three steel bodied sections, joined to each other by full width articulated passages, and Jacobs bogies. The two outer sections each had another bogie and entrance doors. One of them was also equipped with a luggage compartment. Each complete unit was fitted with 134 seats (32 (+7 folding) + 48 + 40 (+7 folding)), and had standing room for 156 persons.

The prototype vehicle's seating arrangements differed somewhat from those of the series vehicles. In all units, the front section, designated as part "a", had leatherette seats with foam padding in a 2+2 layout, and the middle section, part "b", was equipped with laminated PVC seats as fitted to the T3 and K2 type trams. The prototype's rear section, part "c", had grey coloured PVC seating, but in the series units this section's seating was red in colour and was differently laid out.

Each of the two outer sections of each unit was fitted with a pantograph current collector. A total of eight traction motors, two for each of the four bogies, were installed in the chassis. The total continuous power rating of the traction motors was 320 kilowatts (430 hp).

== Service history ==
In mid April 1965, the prototype, no 89.001, began a testing program on the TEŽ line between Poprad-Tatry and Štrbské Pleso. The tests revealed that improvements were required to the emergency brake and the front pantograph. In September 1965, the prototype was returned to the factory, where it was fitted with more efficient compressors and underwent some minor adjustments, including to its heating equipment.

The prototype entered regular service in May 1967 on the Poprad-Tatry to Starý Smokovec line, and operated at speeds of up to 45 kilometres per hour (28 mph). Meanwhile, at the end of June 1966, orders had been placed for the 17 series production units. The first of these, no 89.002, was delivered to Poprad-Tatry in January 1969, and achieved the same speeds as the prototype. By the end of 1969, nos 89.003 to 89.014 had also been delivered; nos 89.015 to 89.018 followed in 1970.

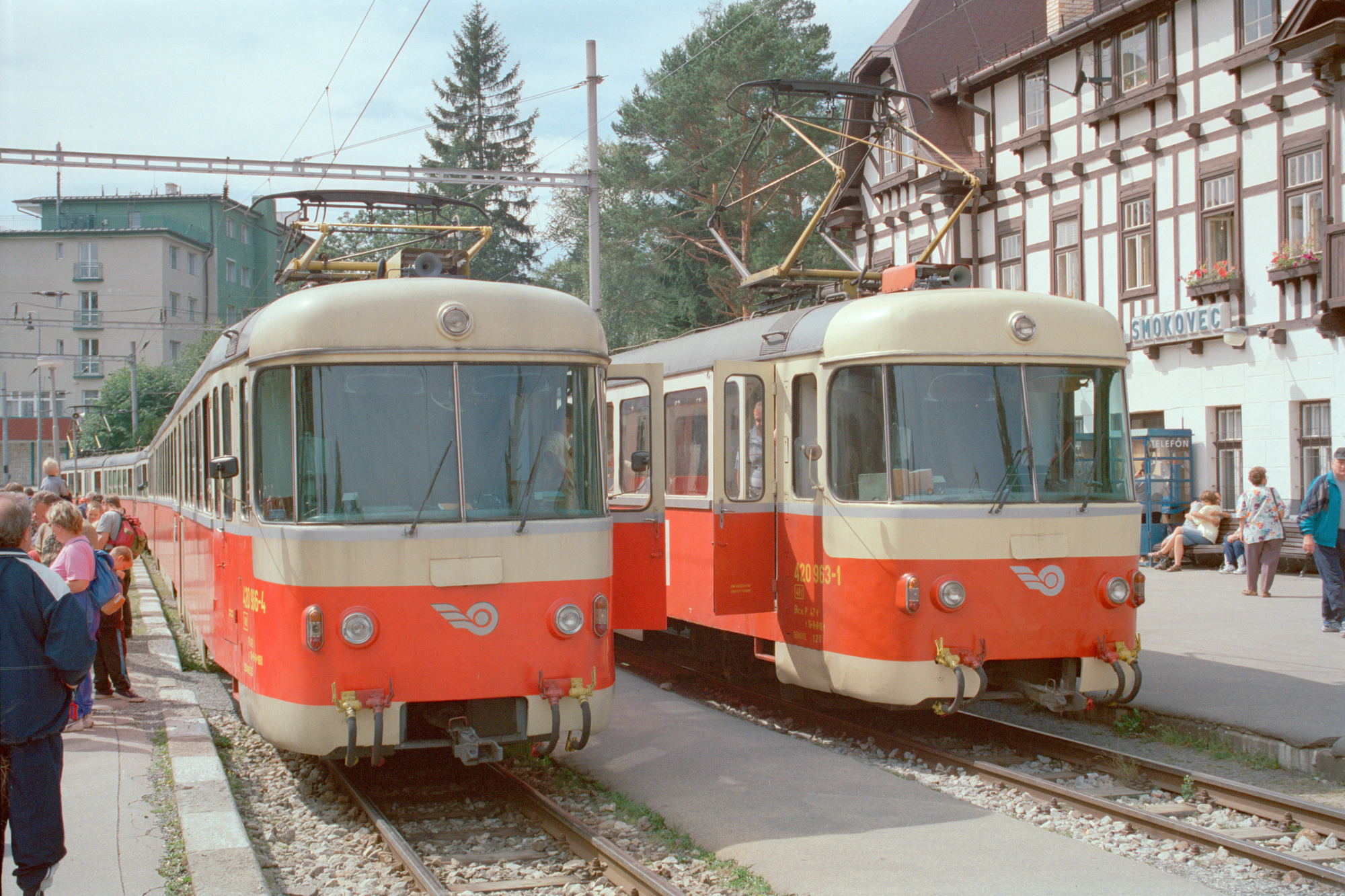
Class 420.95 trains at Starý Smokovec, Summer 2000.

Until the breakup of the former Czechoslovakia at the end of 1992, the 18 class members, and the TEŽ itself, were owned and operated by the Czechoslovak State Railways (ČSD). In service, their well proven three section articulated configuration allowed successful operation on the TEŽ's tight radius curves. Additionally, their all axle drive system enabled rapid acceleration and good traction, especially on uphill sections. On the other hand, the class did suffer from occasional derailments, leading to service interruptions. There were also problems with torn coupling bellows between the units, and the rubber insulating roof mats. In July 1981, due to delays in the delivery of replacements for worn tyres, all but four of the units had to be temporarily taken out of service, and replaced by road buses.

In 1988, the class was redesignated as Class 420.95.

From the start of 1993, the TEŽ and the class were operated by Železnice Slovenskej republiky (ŽSR). By the end of the twentieth century, the class members had reached the end of their working lives. In 2001-2002, they were gradually replaced by the ZSSK Class 425.95, at around the time the operator of the TEŽ was changed to Železničná spoločnosť Slovensko (ZSSK). The class's last regular operations were on the TEŽ's Starý Smokovec–Tatranská Lomnica branch line.

All members of the class have been withdrawn from service, although some were placed in reserve, and one has been preserved as a heritage vehicle.

== See also ==
- High Tatras
- Tatra Electric Railway
- ZSSK Class 425.95
