= Hrebienok =

Ski resort in Slovakia

Coordinates: 49.1583°N 20.2247°E

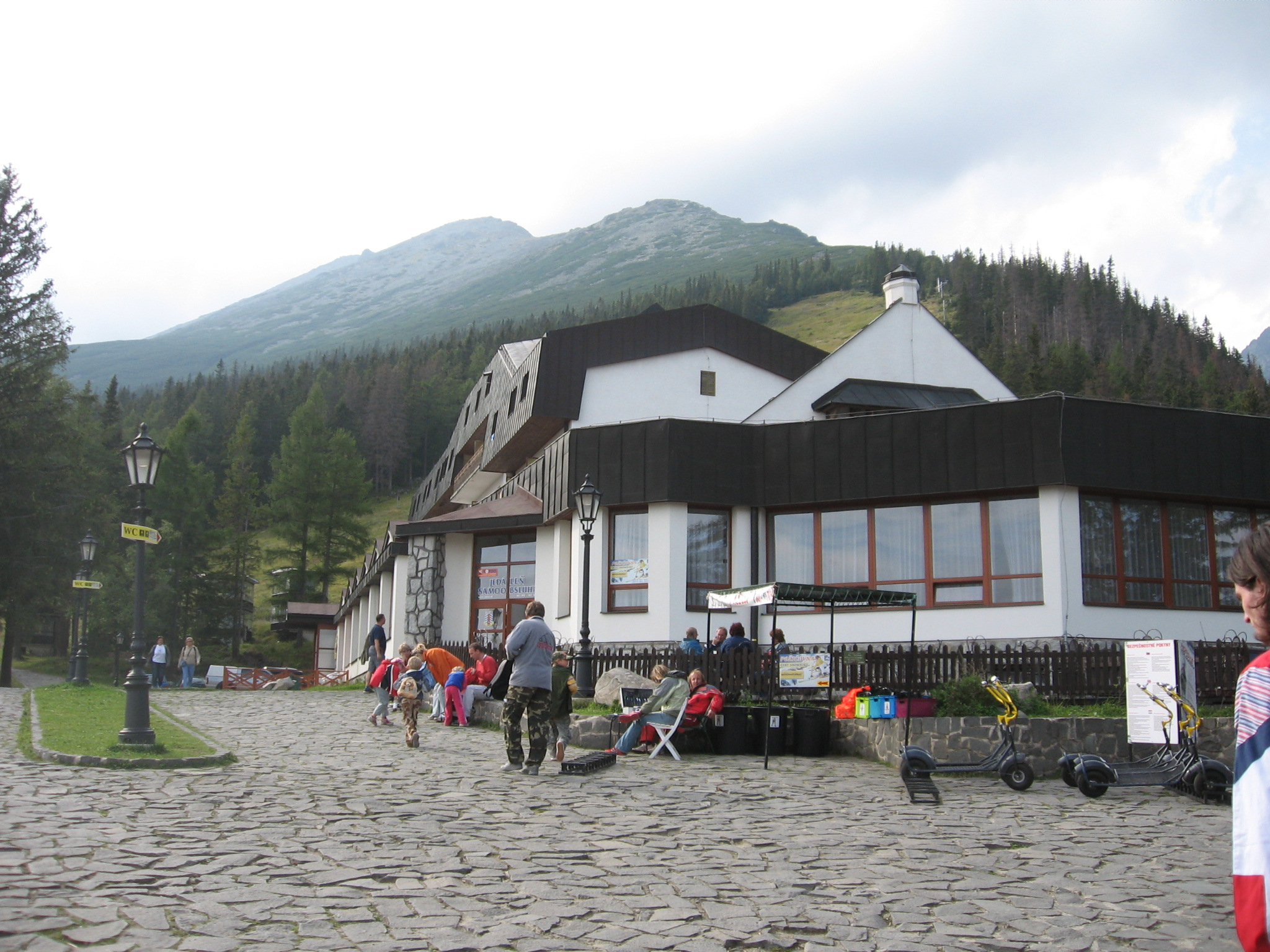
Hrebienok in summer.

Hrebienok (Hungarian: Tarajka) is a small ski resort in the Tatra Mountains, in northern Slovakia. It is connected by the Starý Smokovec–Hrebienok funicular to the town of Starý Smokovec, which is in turn served by the Tatra Electric Railway. The funicular was built in 1908 and has run in its present form since 2007.
