= Vysoké Tatry =

- Municipality
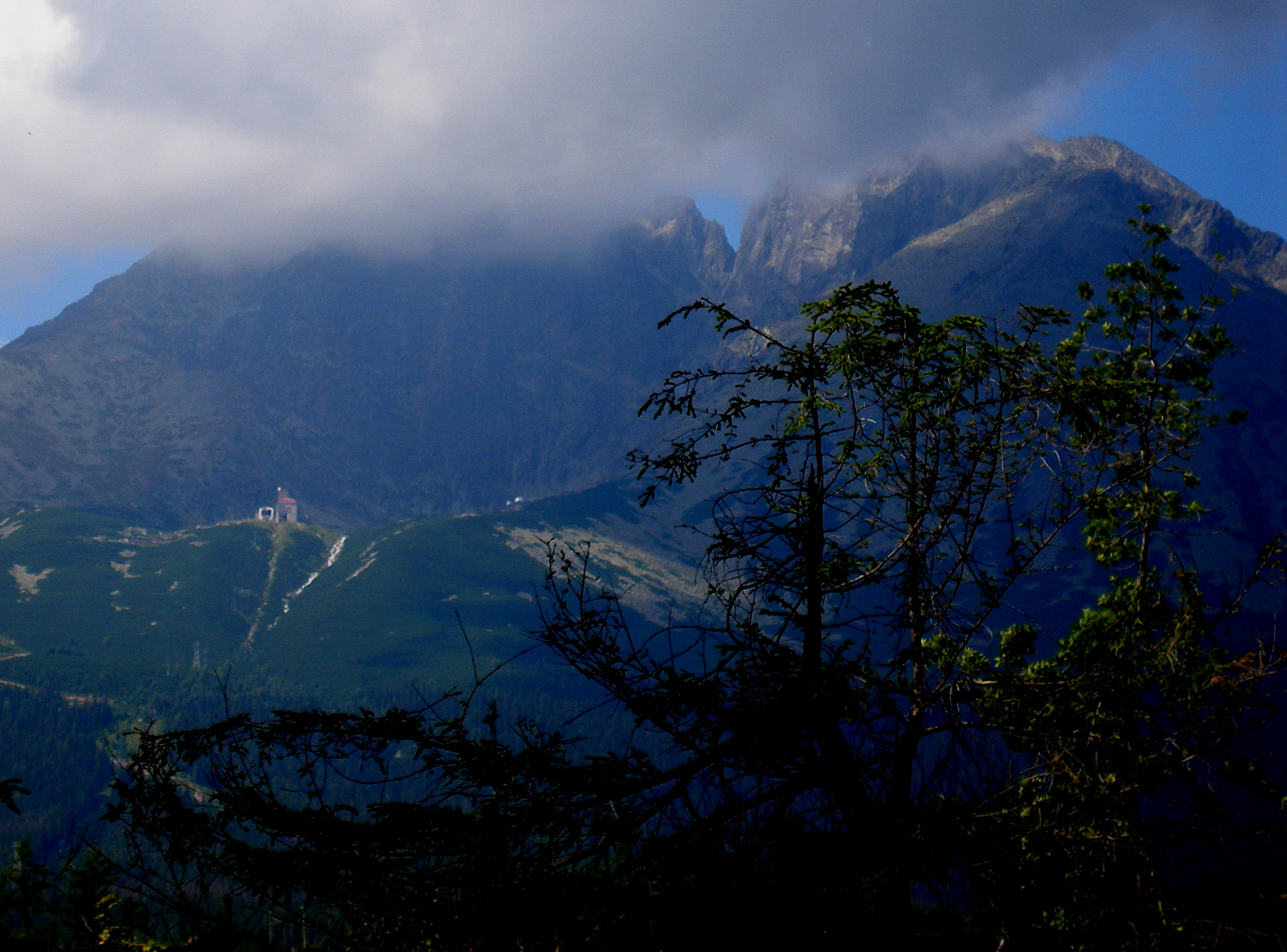
- Skalnaté pleso, part of Vysoké Tatry

- Flag Coat of arms

- Location of Vysoké Tatry in the Prešov Region Location of Vysoké Tatry in Slovakia
- Coordinates: 49.15°N 20.23°E
- Country: Slovakia
- Region: Prešov Region
- District: Poprad District
- First mentioned: 1793

Area
  - Total: 398.16 km^{2} (153.73 sq mi)
- Elevation: 966 m (3,169 ft)

Population (2025)
  - Total: 3,749
- Time zone: UTC+1 (CET)
  - Summer (DST): UTC+2 (CEST)
- Postal code: 620 1
- Area code: +421 52
- Vehicle registration plate (until 2022): PP
- Website: www.vysoketatry.sk

Vysoké Tatry (lit. 'High Tatras';; Hungarian: Magastátra, pronounced [ˈmɒgɒʃtaːtrɒ]; Polish: Wysokie Tatry, pronounced [vɨˈsɔkʲɛ ˈtatrɨ]; Czech: Vysoké Tatry, pronounced ['vɪsokeː tatrɪ]), formally Mesto Vysoké Tatry (lit. 'The Town of High Tatras') is a town at the feet of the Slovak part of High Tatras in Slovakia including all the major resorts in that region. It was created in 1990, and its official name from 1990 to 1999 was Starý Smokovec, which is the name of one of its major settlements.

== Features and statistics ==
The town of Vysoké Tatry is special in many aspects. It is not a true town, but a conglomerate of separate and different settlements (originally separate villages), whose only common feature is that they are the main tourist resorts in the Slovak High Tatras, while being connected through a common railway network (the Tatra Railway). After the country's capital, the town is Slovakia's major tourist destination. It has 3749 inhabitants (2025), excluding tourists. It is located at an elevation of 966 m (3,170 ft) above sea level. Covering 398.16 square kilometres (153.7 square miles), it is Slovakia's second-largest urban area, after the country's capital, and was the largest until 2007, when the village of Štrbské Pleso became a part of Štrba after Štrba's municipal government's successful claim on the Supreme Court.

The local authority, cultural centre, and main shops are located in the settlement of Starý Smokovec.

== Administrative division ==
The town consists of three cadastral areas, which consist of 14 settlements.

Cadastral area	Settlement	Founded	Altitude (m)	Map
Štrbské Pleso^{[note1]}	Vyšné Hágy	1890	1100	A map of the three originally separate municipalities in this area making up the present-day town.
Štrbské Pleso^{[note1]}	Podbanské^{[note2]}	1871	940	A map of the three originally separate municipalities in this area making up the present-day town.
Starý Smokovec	Horný Smokovec		950	A map of the three originally separate municipalities in this area making up the present-day town.
Starý Smokovec	Dolný Smokovec		890	A map of the three originally separate municipalities in this area making up the present-day town.
Starý Smokovec	Nový Smokovec		1000	A map of the three originally separate municipalities in this area making up the present-day town.
Starý Smokovec	Starý Smokovec	1793	1010	A map of the three originally separate municipalities in this area making up the present-day town.
Starý Smokovec	Tatranská Polianka	1885	1005	A map of the three originally separate municipalities in this area making up the present-day town.
Starý Smokovec	Tatranské Zruby	1923	995	A map of the three originally separate municipalities in this area making up the present-day town.
Starý Smokovec	Nová Polianka	1946	1060	A map of the three originally separate municipalities in this area making up the present-day town.
Tatranská Lomnica	Tatranská Lomnica	1893	850	A map of the three originally separate municipalities in this area making up the present-day town.
Tatranská Lomnica	Tatranská Kotlina	1881	760	A map of the three originally separate municipalities in this area making up the present-day town.
Tatranská Lomnica	Tatranská Lesná	1927	915	A map of the three originally separate municipalities in this area making up the present-day town.
Tatranská Lomnica	Kežmarské Žľaby		920	A map of the three originally separate municipalities in this area making up the present-day town.
Tatranská Lomnica	Tatranské Matliare	mid-19th c.	885	A map of the three originally separate municipalities in this area making up the present-day town.
^{note1} The settlement itself was transferred to the village of Štrba, according to the ruling of the Supreme Court. ^{note2} Partly in the village of Pribylina.

== History ==
The present-day town was created in 1990 and has a complicated administrative history.

The municipality (that is, not a town) of Vysoké Tatry was created as early as 1947 on the territory of the following formerly distinct municipalities: Batizovce, Huncovce, Folvarky, Gerlachov, Kežmarok, Liptovská Kokava, Mlynica, Nová Lesná, Malý Slavkov, Mengusovce, výbor Vysoké Tatry" - literally, "The United National Committee of High Tatras", 'national committee' being the term then used to designate local authorities in Czechoslovakia.

In 1954, parts of the municipalities Pribylina (the majority of which was returned in 2004), Východná, and Liptovská Kokava were added to Vysoké Tatry. Starý Smokovec was made the seat of the Vysoké Tatry municipality.

In 1960, the Vysoké Tatry municipality ceased to exist and was divided into the following separate municipalities: Starý Smokovec (enhanced with town status), Štrbské Pleso, Tatranská Lomnica, Ždiar, and Štôla. However, since 1964 these municipalities had again a common local authority, although they remained distinct municipalities.

In 1990, three of the above municipalities - Starý Smokovec, Štrbské pleso and Tatranská Lomnica - were merged to create the town of 'Starý Smokovec'(named after the settlement serving as the seat of the authorities). The remaining municipalities - Ždiar and Štôla - are still independent municipalities.

In 1999, the town of 'Starý Smokovec' was renamed 'Vysoké Tatry'.

== Population ==
Historical population
Year	Pop.	±%
1970	6,158	—
1980	6,478	+5.2%
1991	5,618	−13.3%
2001	5,407	−3.8%
2011	4,250	−21.4%
2021	3,901	−8.2%
Source: Censuses

Population statistic (10 years)
Year	1995	2005	2015	2025
Count	5682	4804	4087	3749
Difference		−15.45%	−14.92%	−8.27%

Population statistic
Year	2024	2025
Count	3770	3749
Difference		−0.55%

It has a population of 3749 people (31 December 2025).

=== Ethnicity ===
Census 2021 (1+%)
Ethnicity	Number	Fraction
Slovak	3508	89.92%
Not found out	310	7.94%
Czech	89	2.28%
Total	3901	

In year 2021 was 3901 people by ethnicity 3508 as Slovak, 310 as Not found out, 89 as Czech, 21 as Rusyn, 21 as Polish, 20 as Hungarian, 18 as Other, 9 as Jewish, 7 as Austrian, 7 as German, 5 as Romani, 4 as Ukrainian, 4 as Italian, 4 as English, 3 as Irish, 2 as Russian, 1 as Chinese, 1 as Vietnamese, 1 as Turkish, 1 as Moravian and 1 as French.

Note on population: The difference values of population numbers in the table "Population statistic" and in the sections "Ethnicity" & "Religion" is caused by the use of various statistical methods.

=== Religion ===
Census 2021 (1+%)
Religion	Number	Fraction
Roman Catholic Church	1930	49.47%
None	1203	30.84%
Not found out	300	7.69%
Evangelical Church	221	5.67%
Greek Catholic Church	129	3.31%
Total	3901	

In year 2021 was 3901 people by religion 1930 from Roman Catholic Church, 1203 from None, 300 from Not found out, 221 from Evangelical Church, 129 from Greek Catholic Church, 27 from Ad hoc movements, 18 from Other, 15 from Eastern Orthodox Church, 14 from Calvinist Church, 12 from Buddhism, 7 from Other and not ascertained christian church, 5 from Christian Congregations in Slovakia, 5 from Baptists Church, 4 from Paganism and natural spirituality, 3 from Hinduism, 3 from Church of the Brethren, 2 from Jehovah's Witnesses, 2 from United Methodist Church and 1 from Apostolic Church.

== Sport ==
In 1935 and 1970 the area hosted the FIS Nordic World Ski Championships. The area was scheduled to host the 17th Winter Deaflympics, but the event was cancelled because of the lack of readiness by the Slovakian Deaflympic Organizing Committee to host the games.

== Notable people ==
- Ludwig Greiner, identified Gerlachovský Peak as the summit of the Tatras, Carpathians

== Twin towns — sister cities ==
Vysoké Tatry is twinned with:

- Bukowina Tatrzańska, Poland
- Košice, Slovakia (since 2006)
- Nosegawa, Japan
- Pardubice, Czech Republic
- Poprad, Slovakia
- Zakopane, Poland
