= Tatranská Lomnica railway station =

Railway station in Vysoké Tatry, Slovakia

Tatranská Lomnica
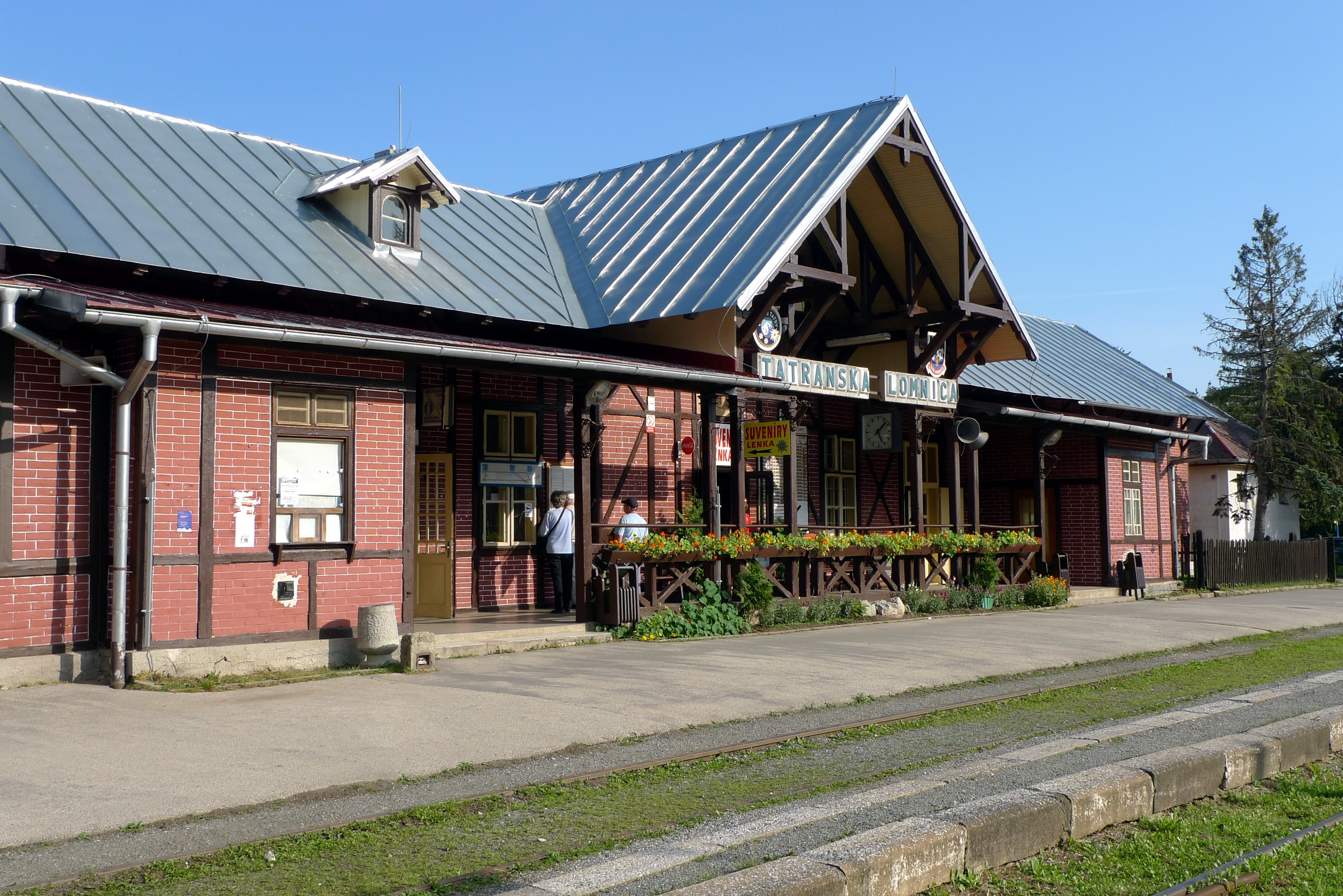
- The station building in summer

General information
- Location: 06201 Vysoké Tatry-Tatranská Lomnica; Vysoké Tatry; Poprad District; Prešov Region; Slovakia
- Coordinates: 49°09′53″N 20°16′46″E
- Elevation: 850 m (2,790 ft)
- Owner: Železnice Slovenskej republiky (ŽSR)
- Operator: Železnice Slovenskej republiky
- Lines: 184 Poprad-Tatry–Tatranská Lomnica (standard gauge); 185 Starý Smokovec–Tatranská Lomnica (Tatra Electric Railway (TEŽ))
- Distance: 8.89 km (5.52 mi) from Poprad-Tatry (standard gauge); 5.95 km (3.70 mi) from Starý Smokovec (TEŽ)
- Connections: Local buses

History
- Opened: 1 September 1895
- Electrified: 16 December 1911 (TEŽ)
Location
- Location within Slovakia

Tatranská Lomnica railway station (Slovak: Železničná stanica Tatranská Lomnica) is a break-of-gauge junction station in the High Tatras. It serves the settlement of Tatranská Lomnica, in the Prešov Region, northeastern Slovakia.

Opened in 1895, the station is the eastern terminus of the Starý Smokovec—Tatranská Lomnica branch line operated by the metre gauge Tatra Electric Railway (TEŽ). It also forms the junction between that line and the standard gauge Poprad-Tatry–Tatranská Lomnica branch, which is a spur line from the Poprad-Tatry–Plaveč railway, another standard gauge branch line.

The station is currently owned by Železnice Slovenskej republiky (ŽSR); train services are operated by Železničná spoločnosť Slovensko (ZSSK).

== Location ==
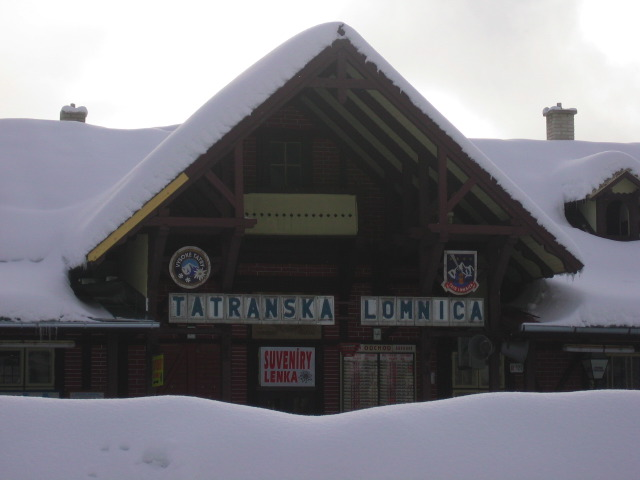
The station building in winter, 2005.

Tatranská Lomnica railway station is right in the heart of Tatranská Lomnica, which forms part of the town of Vysoké Tatry, a conglomerate of separate and different settlements (originally separate villages).

The only common feature of the Vysoké Tatry settlements is that they are the main tourist resorts in the Slovak High Tatras, connected through a common railway network, the TEŽ.

After the country's capital, Vysoké Tatry is Slovakia's major tourist destination.

== History ==
The station was opened on 1 September 1895, together with the rest of the 8.89 km (5.52 mi) standard gauge Poprad-Tatry–Tatranská Lomnica railway.

On 16 December 1911, Tatranská Lomnica became a break of gauge junction station, with the opening of the 6 km (3.7 mi) long TEŽ branch between Starý Smokovec and Tatranská Lomnica.

== Facilities ==
The station building is a single storey building with a gable end facing the main platform. It houses information and ticketing facilities, and a restaurant.

== Train services ==
Tatranská Lomnica railway station is the junction of the following High Tatras railway lines:

- Line 184: Starý Smokovec–Tatranská Lomnica (TEŽ metre gauge)
- Line 185:Poprad-Tatry–Plaveč; Studený Potok–Tatranská Lomnica (standard gauge)

== Interchange ==
The station offers interchange with local buses.

== See also ==
- History of rail transport in Slovakia
- Rail transport in Slovakia
