= Nová Polianka =

- Municipality
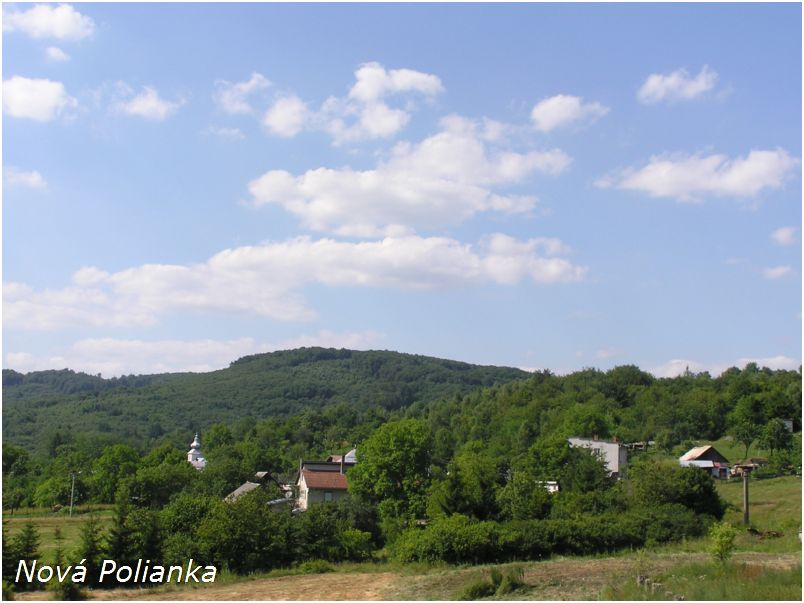

- Flag

- Location of Nová Polianka in the Prešov Region Location of Nová Polianka in Slovakia
- Coordinates: 49.28°N 21.62°E
- Country: Slovakia
- Region: Prešov Region
- District: Svidník District
- First mentioned: 1414

Area
  - Total: 5.47 km^{2} (2.11 sq mi)
- Elevation: 344 m (1,129 ft)

Population (2025)
  - Total: 74
- Time zone: UTC+1 (CET)
  - Summer (DST): UTC+2 (CEST)
- Postal code: 890 1
- Area code: +421 54
- Vehicle registration plate (until 2022): SK

Nová Polianka (Rusyn: Нова Полянка; Hungarian: Mérgesvágása, until 1899: Mergeska) is a village and municipality in Svidník District in the Prešov Region of north-eastern Slovakia.

== History ==
In historical records the village was first mentioned in 1414.

== Geography ==
The municipality lies at an altitude of 344 metres (1,129 ft) and covers an area of 5.47 km^{2} (2.11 sq mi) (2025).

== Population ==
Population statistic (10 years)
Year	1995	2005	2015	2025
Count	62	57	76	74
Difference		−8.06%	+33.33%	−2.63%

Population statistic
Year	2024	2025
Count	71	74
Difference		+4.22%

It has a population of 74 people (31 December 2025).

=== Ethnicity ===
Census 2021 (1+ %)
Ethnicity	Number	Fraction
Slovak	62	93.93%
Rusyn	32	48.48%
Not found out	2	3.03%
Czech	1	1.51%
Total	66	

In year 2021 was 66 people by ethnicity 62 as Slovak, 32 as Rusyn, 2 as Not found out and 1 as Czech.

Note on population: The difference values of population numbers in the table "Population statistic" and in the sections "Ethnicity" & "Religion" is caused by the use of various statistical methods.

=== Religion ===
Census 2021 (1+ %)
Religion	Number	Fraction
Eastern Orthodox Church	39	59.09%
Greek Catholic Church	12	18.18%
Roman Catholic Church	7	10.61%
None	6	9.09%
Not found out	1	1.52%
Evangelical Church	1	1.52%
Total	66	

In year 2021 was 66 people by religion 39 from Eastern Orthodox Church, 12 from Greek Catholic Church, 7 from Roman Catholic Church, 6 from None, 1 from Not found out and 1 from Evangelical Church.
