= Tatranská Lomnica =

Slovak resort town

Coordinates: 49°10′N 20°17′E

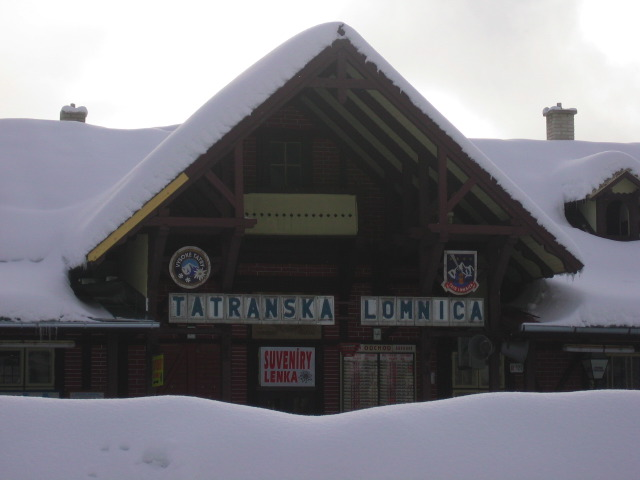
Tatranská Lomnica railway station

Tatranská Lomnica (Hungarian: Tátralomnic, Polish: Tatrzańska Łomnica) is a part of the town of Vysoké Tatry in northern Slovakia in the Tatras.
