= Nový Smokovec =

Coordinates: 49°08′N 20°13′E

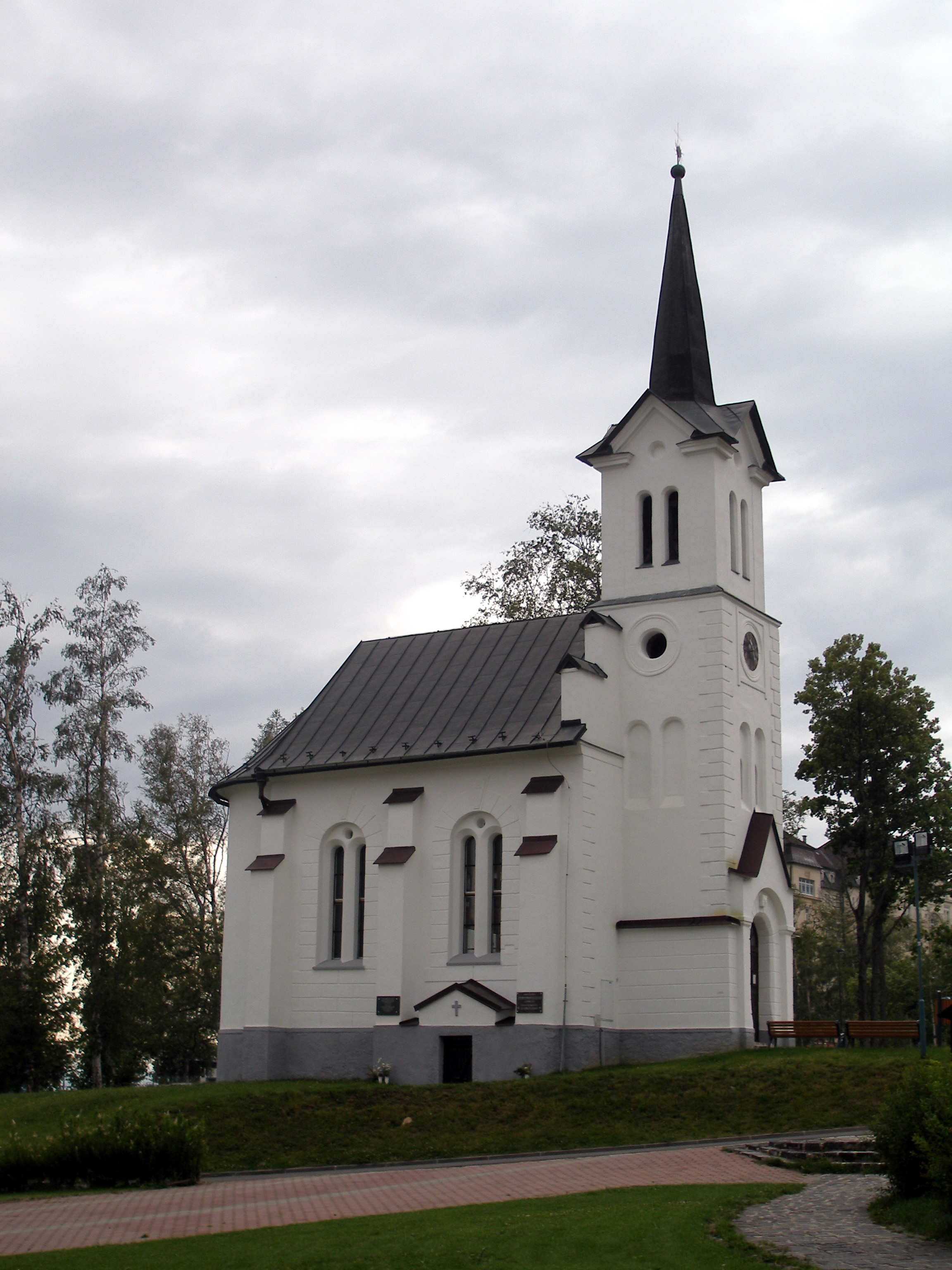
The Old Church

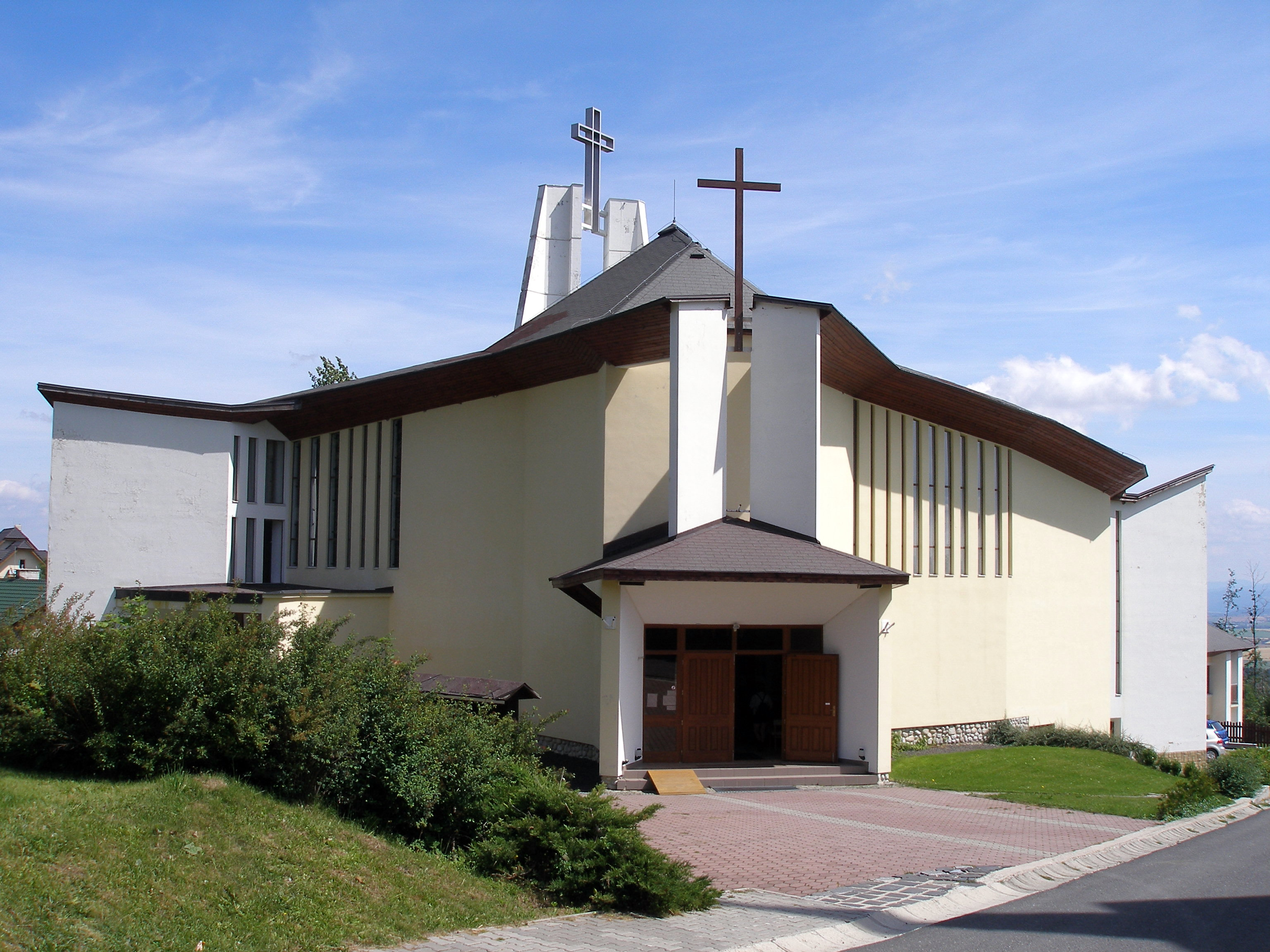
The New Church

Nový Smokovec (Hungarian: Újtátrafüred) is a spa village in Poprad District, Slovakia. It is administratively a part of the town of Vysoké Tatry.
