= Starý Smokovec–Hrebienok funicular =

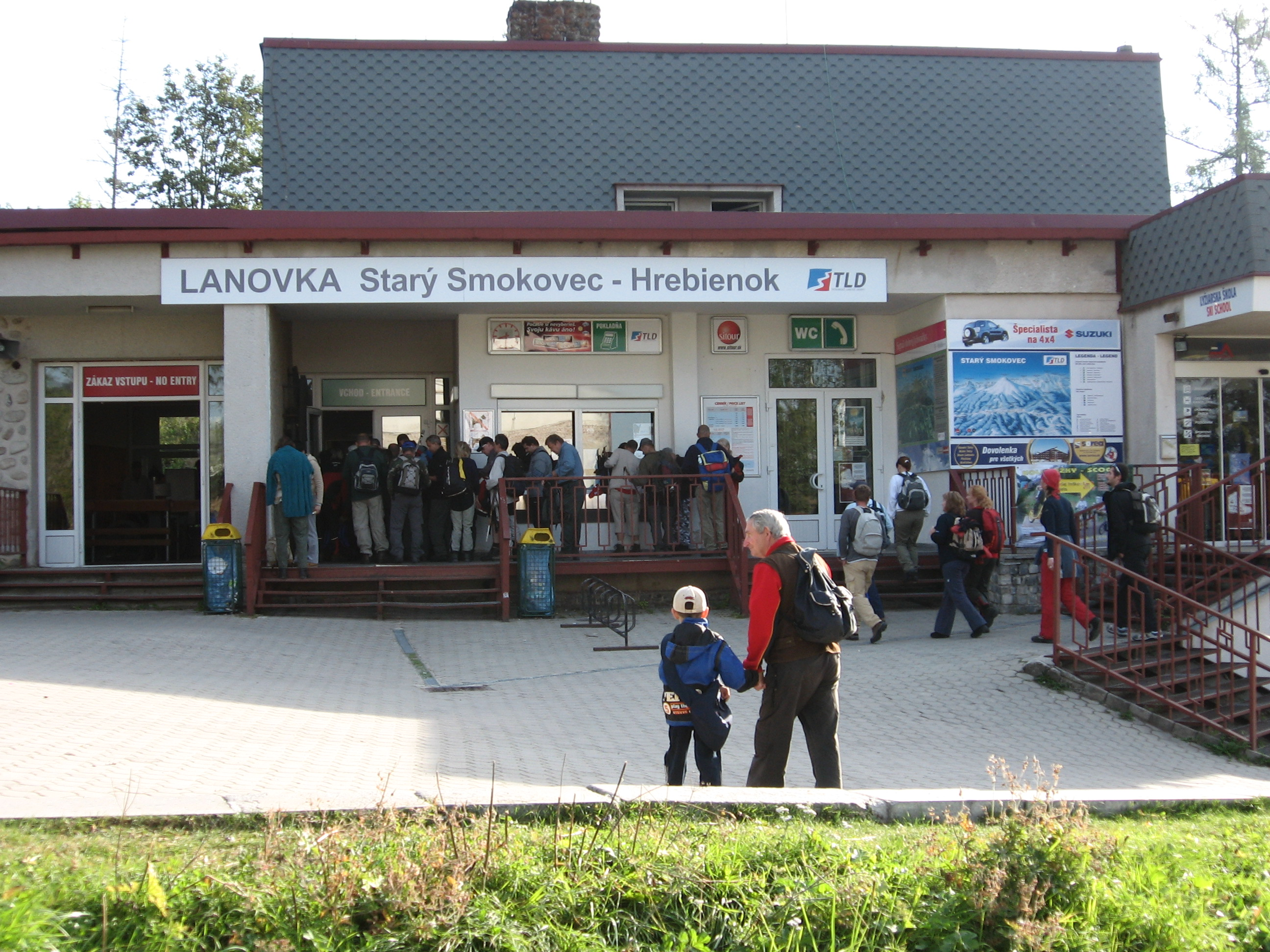
- Station at Starý Smokovec

Overview
- Coordinates: 49°8′43.85″N 20°13′14.14″E

Service
- Type: Funicular

Technical
- Line length: 1,937 m (6,355 ft)
- Track gauge: 1,000 mm (3 ft 3 3/8 in) metre gauge
- Maximum incline: 14.8%

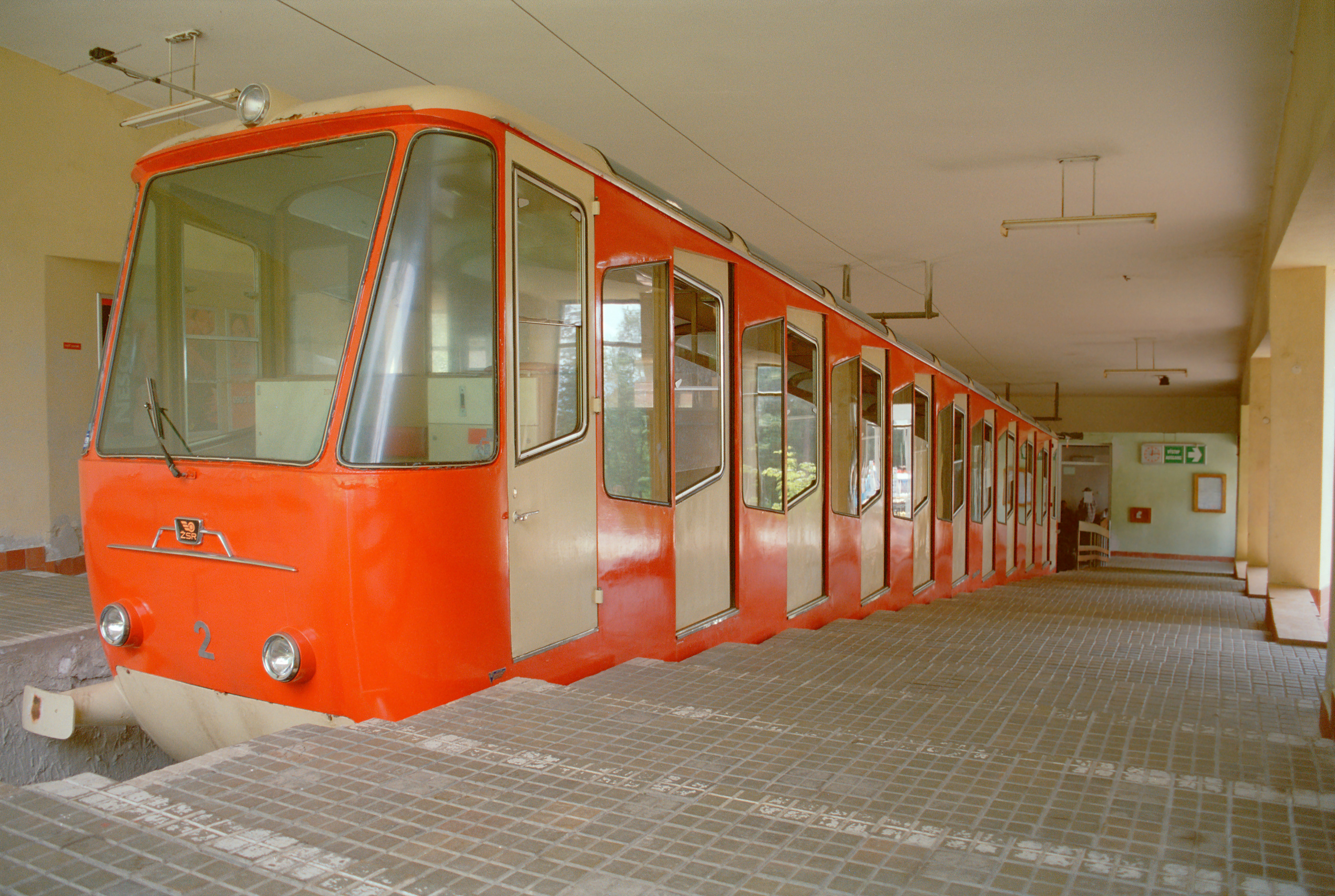
Funicular car (1960s Ceretti-Tanfani model) at the terminus of Starý Smokovec

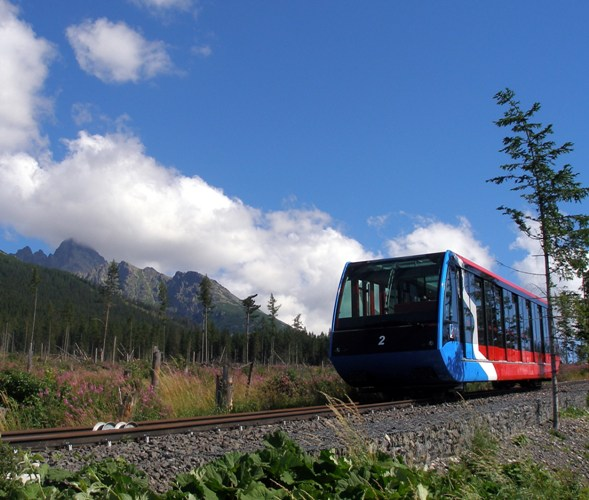
No. 2 rolling stock of the funicular

The Starý Smokovec–Hrebienok funicular (Slovak: Pozemná lanová dráha Starý Smokovec – Hrebienok) is a funicular between Starý Smokovec and the tourist complex at the summit of Hrebienok in the High Tatras, Slovakia.

== History ==
The first rolling stock for the funicular was ordered from the legendary Ganz Works by Matejka és Kriger (Matejka Vince and Kriger Vilmos), a company based in Poprad (then part of Hungary, within Austria-Hungary). After several years of preparations, the first tourist passengers travelled by funicular on 20 December 1908. The funicular operated on the original track until 1967.

Great reconstruction of the line took place in 1967. New technology for the entire line was provided by the Italian Ceretti-Tanfani company. The passenger capacity of the new funicular cars increased from 45 to 130 passengers. With the implementation of then up-to-date technology, the duration of a one-way ride on the route decreased from 11 to 7 minutes.

The 1960s rolling stock was replaced with brand new vehicles in November 2007. New rolling stocks were made by Garaventa, a company based in Bern, Switzerland. Doppelmayr, an Austrian company helped in the creation of the new funicular, which has a capacity of 160 person, 30 more than the older one.

== Operation ==
The line has the following parameters:

Number of cars	2
Configuration	Single track with passing loop etc.
Track length	1,937 metres (6,355 ft)
Rise	247 metres (810 ft)
gradient	14.8%
Track gauge	1,000 mm (3 ft 3 3/8 in) metre gauge
Capacity	1600 passengers per hour
Maximum speed	10 metres per second (22.4 mph)
Travel time	4.5 minutes
