= Tatra Electric Railway =

Narrow gauge railway line in Slovakia

Coordinates: 49°08′24″N 20°13′31″E

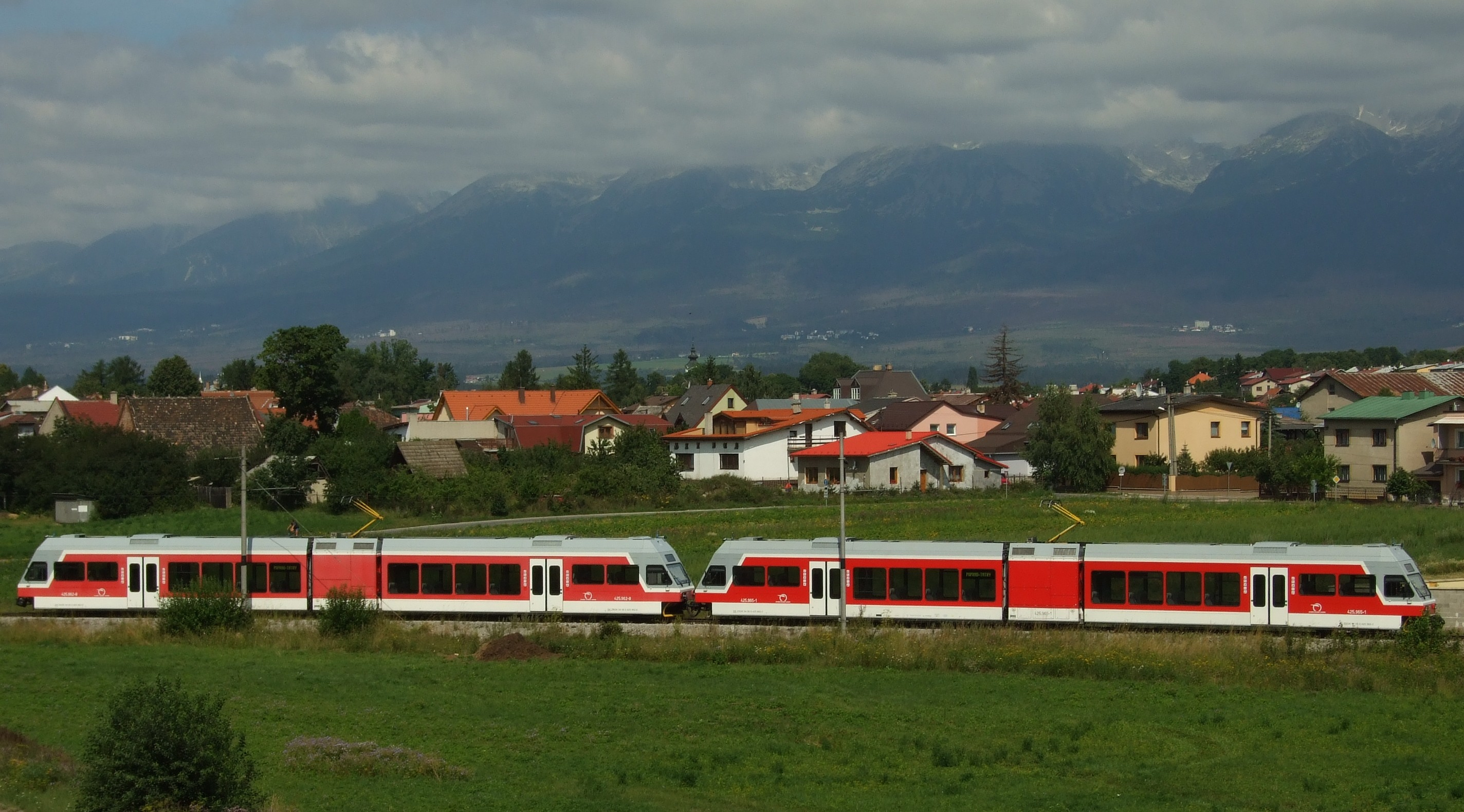
- TEŽ train near Poprad-Tatry, with High Tatras in the background.

Overview
- Owner: Železnice Slovenskej republiky (ŽSR)
- Locale: Slovakia

Service
- Operator: Železničná spoločnosť Slovensko (ZSSK)

Technical
- Line length: 35 km (22 mi)
- Track gauge: 1,000 mm (3 ft 3 3/8 in) metre gauge
- Electrification: 1,500 V DC
- Highest elevation: 1,350 m (4,430 ft)
Route map

The Tatra Electric Railway (Slovak: Tatranská elektrická železnica), colloquially Tatra Railway, is an electrified (1500 V DC) single track 1,000 mm (3 ft 3 3/8 in) narrow gauge railway in the Slovak part of the Tatra Mountains. It consists of two connected lines:

- Poprad – Starý Smokovec – Štrbské Pleso (29,1 km)
- Starý Smokovec – Tatranská Lomnica (5,9 km)

At Štrbské Pleso, the railway connects to the Štrbské Pleso–Štrba rack railway.

At Starý Smokovec, the railway connects to the Starý Smokovec–Hrebienok funicular.

== History ==
After the completion of the Košice-Bohumín Railway in 1871 and of Poprad - Kežmarok in 1892, the High Tatras were easier to access, and tourism expanded, which required accessibility. In 1896, a rack railway from Štrbské Pleso to Štrba was built.

Finally, it was decided to build an electrified, narrow gauge railway from Poprad to Starý Smokovec. Construction started in 1906 and the track was opened in 1908. The branch line from Starý Smokovec to Tatranská Lomnica was opened in 1911 and the final extension from Starý Smokovec to Štrbské Pleso was opened in 1912. At that time, the railway was used for passenger, as well as for cargo transport.

In 1948, the railway was nationalised. From 1950 to 1992, it was managed by the Czechoslovak State Railways and since 1993 by the Railways of the Slovak Republic.

In the second half of the 1960s, the railway underwent major reconstruction during preparations for the FIS Nordic World Ski Championships in 1970. Since 1970, the railway provides only passenger service.

At the beginning of the 21st century, the old ČSD Class EMU 89.0 trains built by ČKD in the 1960s were replaced by new Stadler GTW ZSSK Class 425.95 railcars.

== Rolling stock ==
Photo	Class	Trains in service	Number built	Notes
	ZSSK Class 495.95	5	5	
	ZSSK Class 425.95	15	15	
	ŽSR Class 420.95	1 (as Heritage railway)	18	Class 420.95 is an EMU consisting of three sections. #EMU 89.0009 is preserved as a historic vehicle. #420.953-2 is undergoing restoration.
	Ganz	1 (as Heritage railway)		Historic train consisting of powered car #22, trailer #12 and trailer #16.

== Gallery ==
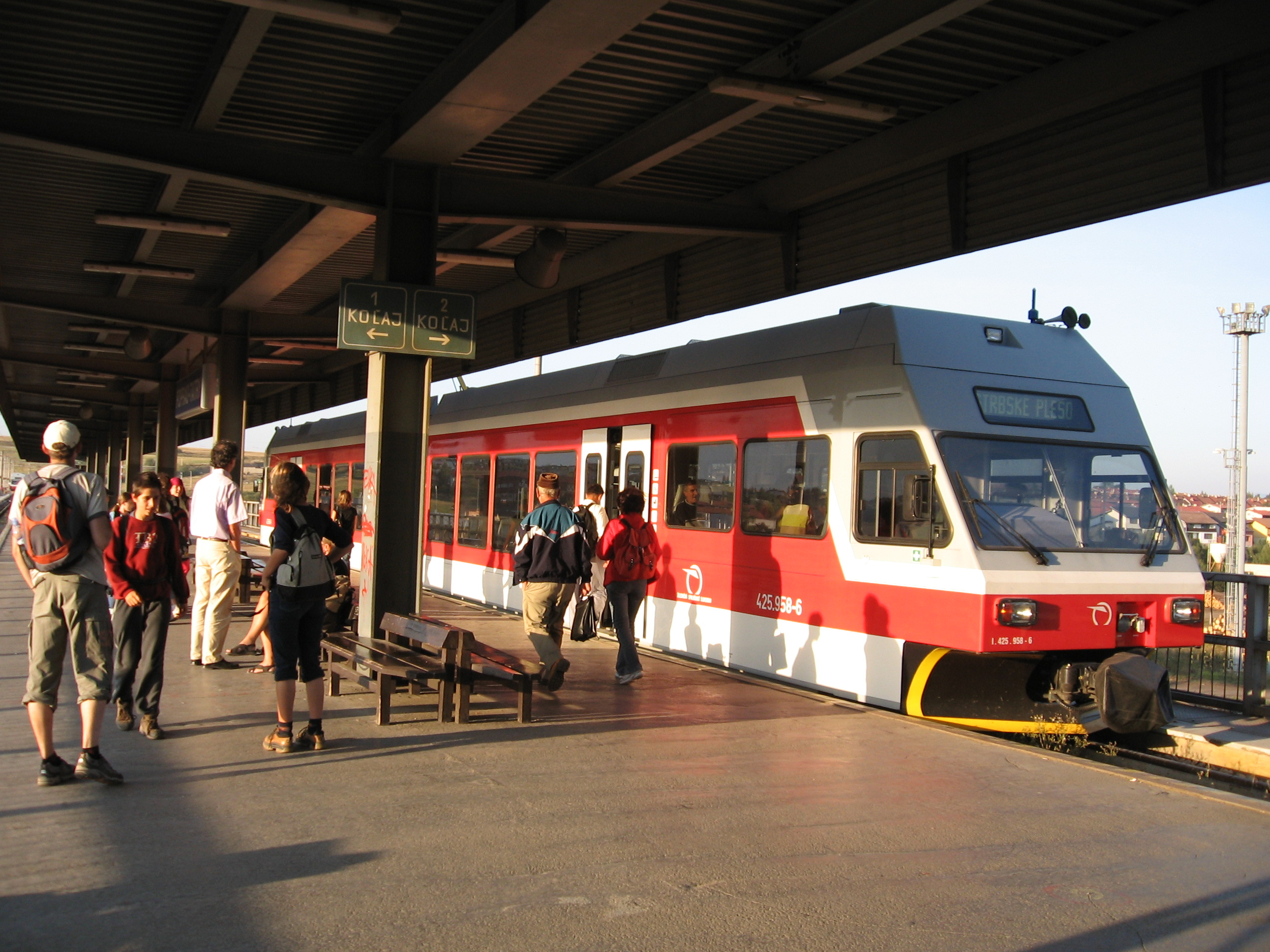
Tatra railway in Poprad

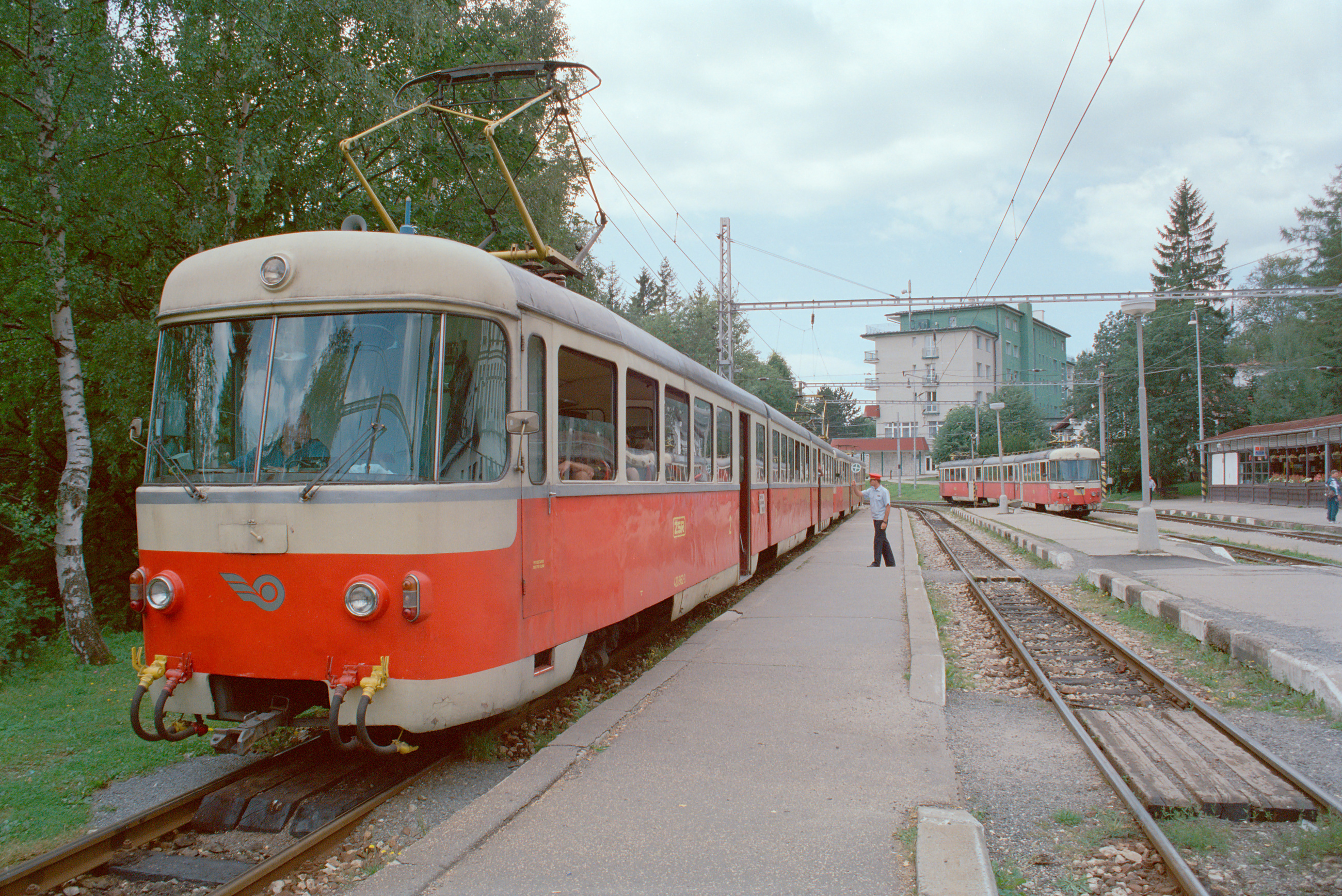
Railway Station in Starý Smokovec, with old set of trains (ČSD Class EMU 89.0)

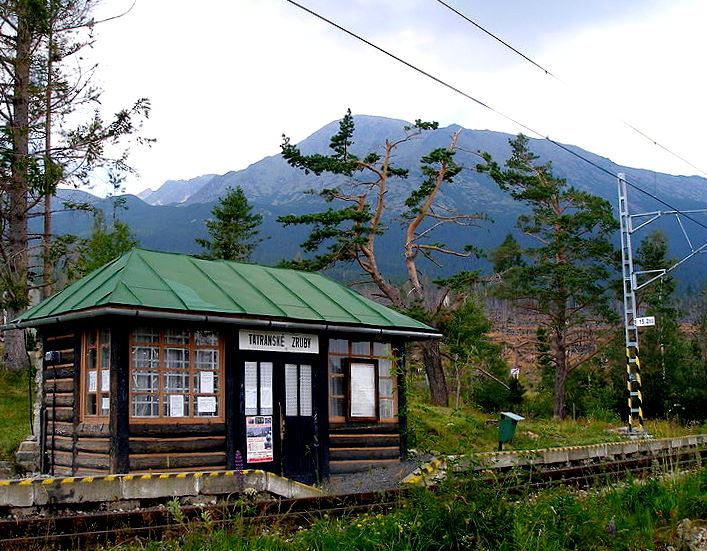
Railway Halt in Tatranské Zruby

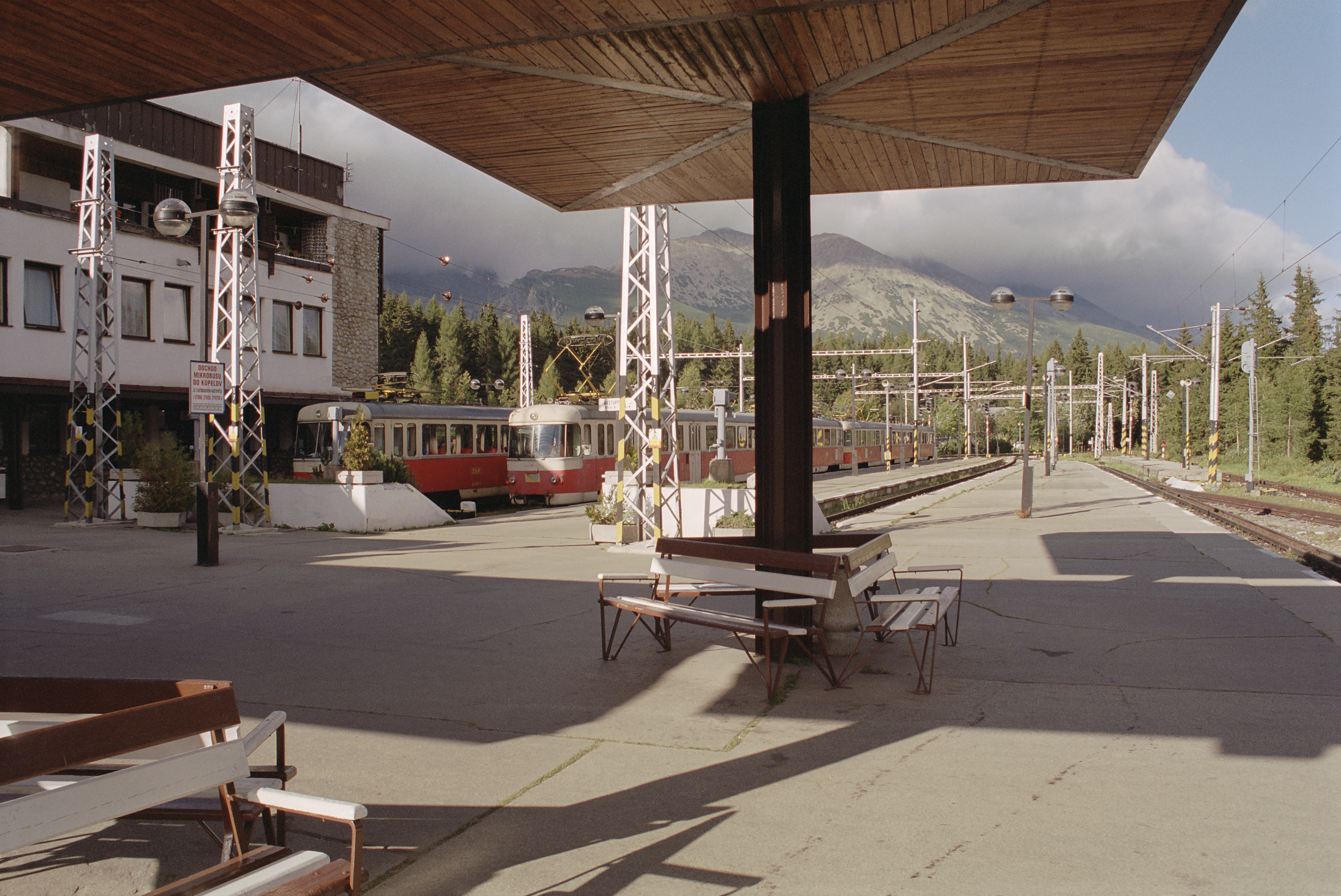
Railway Station in Štrbské Pleso, transfer point between the Tatra electric railway and the Štrbské Pleso - Štrba rack railway

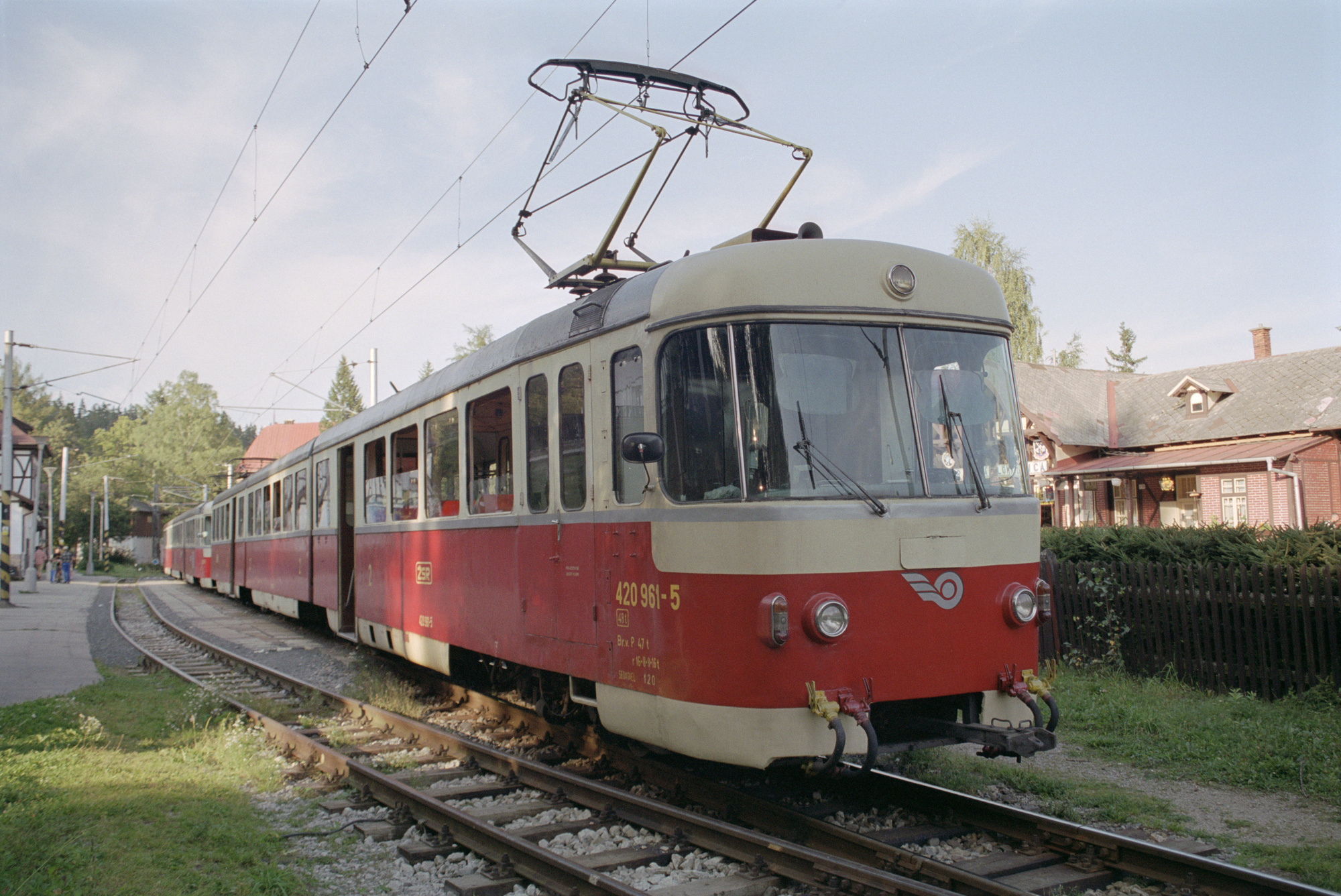
Station at Tatranská Lomnica

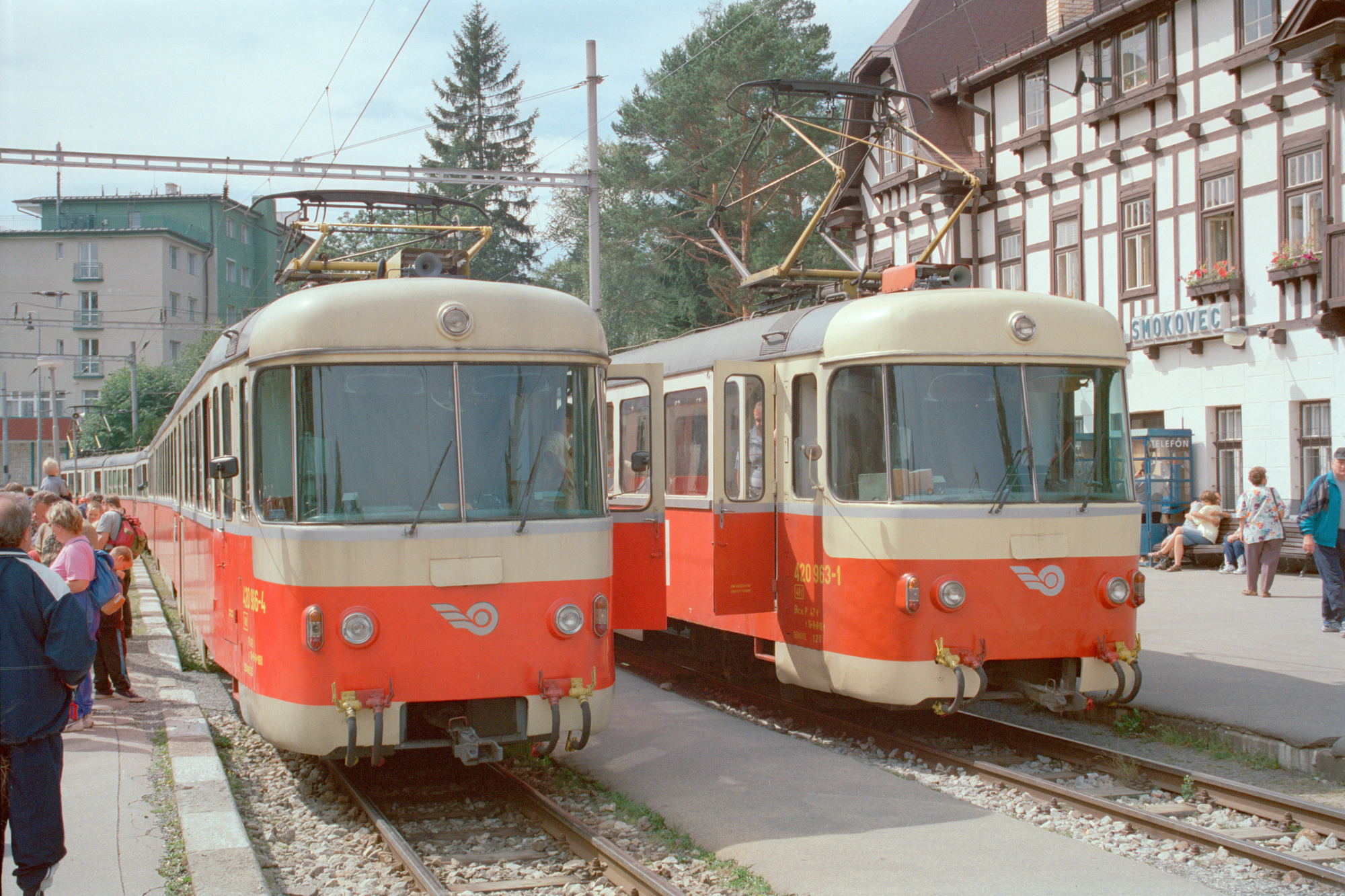
Station at Starý Smokovec

== See also ==
- High Tatras
- List of highest railways in Europe
