= Matterhorn Gotthard Bahn ABDeh 4/8 =

Swiss mixed rack and adhesion trainset

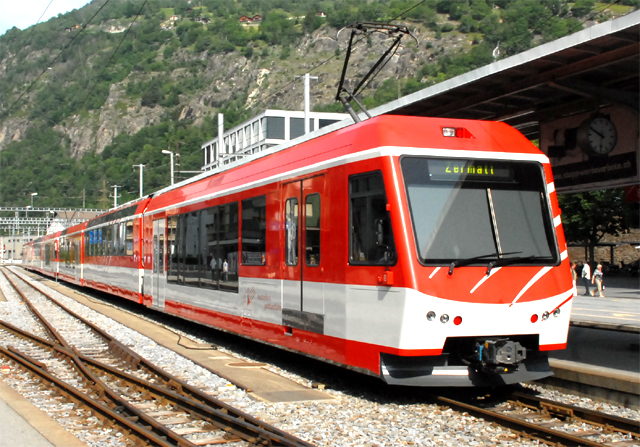
- ABDeh 4/8 2022 and ABDeh 4/10 2011 at Brig, 2010.
- Manufacturer: Stadler Rail AG, Bussnang
- Family name: Stadler GTW
- Constructed: 2007–2008
- Number built: 2
- Number in service: 2
- Fleet numbers: 2021–2022
- Capacity: First class: 30 seats Second class: 114 seats
- Operators: Matterhorn Gotthard Bahn

Specifications
- Train length: 56,600 mm (185 ft 8 in)
- Width: 2,650 mm (8 ft 8 in)
- Height: 3,950 mm (13 ft 0 in)
- Maximum speed: Adhesion: 80 km/h (50 mph); Rack rail: 40 km/h (25 mph)
- Weight: 77 tonnes (169,800 lb)
- Traction system: ADtranz
- Power output: 4 x 325 kW (440 hp)
- Electric system(s): 11 kV 16.7 Hz
- Current collection: Overhead
- UIC classification: Adhesion: 2'Bo'Bo'2'; Rack rail: 2'zz'zz'2'
- Track gauge: 1,000 mm (3 ft 3 3/8 in) metre gauge

The Matterhorn Gotthard Bahn ABDeh 4/8, also known as Komet, is a two member class of metre gauge electric trains operated by the Matterhorn Gotthard Bahn (MGB), in the Canton of Valais, Switzerland.

The class is so named under the Swiss locomotive and railcar classification system. According to that system, ABDeh 4/8 denotes an electric railcar with first class, second class and baggage compartments, and a total of eight axles, four of which are drive axles fitted with cogwheels for rack rail operation.

== Technical details ==
The ABDeh 4/8 class is part of the Stadler GTW family of articulated railcars. It has an aluminium frame, semi panoramic low floor bodies, and air suspension. The first class compartment has 30 seats, and there are 114 second class seats.

Each of the powered bogies fitted to the class is equipped with two traction motors, and with Abt rack system pinion wheels.

Both members of the class can be marshalled as part of a longer train comprising up to three similar trains, including ABDeh 4/10 2011 class trains.

== Service history ==
The class is used for regional train services on the Brig–Visp–Zermatt line.

== See also ==
- Gornergratbahn
- History of rail transport in Switzerland
- Rail transport in Switzerland
