= Matterhorn Gotthard Bahn ABDeh 4/10 =

Swiss mixed rack and adhesion trainset

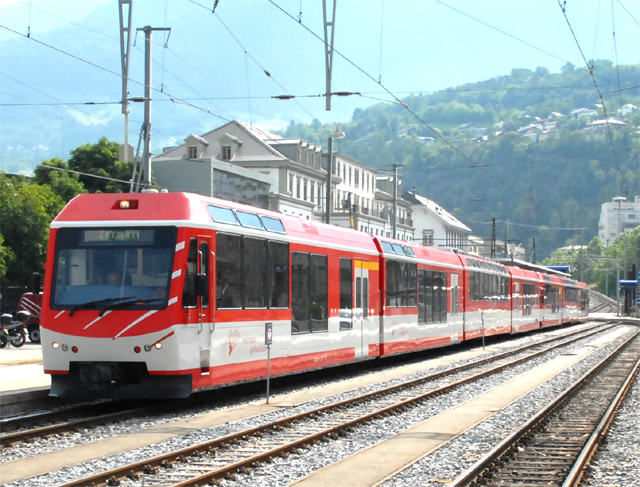
- ABDeh 4/10 2011 and ABDeh 4/8 2022 at Brig, 2010.
- Manufacturer: Stadler Rail AG, Bussnang
- Family name: Stadler GTW
- Constructed: 2008
- Number built: 3
- Number in service: 3
- Fleet numbers: 2011–2013
- Capacity: First class: 47 seats Second class: 141 seats
- Operators: Matterhorn Gotthard Bahn

Specifications
- Train length: 74,700 mm (245 ft 1 in)
- Width: 2,650 mm (8 ft 8 in)
- Height: 3,950 mm (13 ft 0 in)
- Maximum speed: Adhesion: 80 km/h (50 mph); Rack rail: 40 km/h (25 mph)
- Weight: 95 tonnes (209,400 lb)
- Traction system: ADtranz
- Power output: 4 x 325 kW (440 hp)
- Electric system(s): 11 kV 16.7 Hz
- Current collector(s): Overhead
- UIC classification: Adhesion: 2'Bo'Bo'2'2'; Rack rail: 2'zz'zz'2'2'
- Track gauge: 1,000 mm (3 ft 3 3/8 in) metre gauge

The Matterhorn Gotthard Bahn ABDeh 4/10, also known as Komet, is a three member class of metre gauge electric trains operated by the Matterhorn Gotthard Bahn (MGB), in the Canton of Valais, Switzerland.

The class is so named under the Swiss locomotive and railcar classification system. According to that system, ABDeh 4/10 denotes an electric railcar with first class, second class and baggage compartments, and a total of ten axles, four of which are drive axles fitted with cogwheels for rack rail operation.

== Technical details ==
The ABDeh 4/10 class is part of the Stadler GTW family of articulated railcars. It has an aluminium frame, semi panoramic low floor bodies, and air suspension. The first class compartment has 47 seats, and there are 141 second class seats.

Each of the powered bogies fitted to the class is equipped with two traction motors, and with Abt rack system pinion wheels.

All three members of the class can be marshalled as part of a longer train comprising up to three similar trains, including ABDeh 4/8 class trains.

== Service history ==
The class is used for regional train services on the Brig–Visp–Zermatt line.

== See also ==
- Gornergratbahn
- History of rail transport in Switzerland
- Rail transport in Switzerland
