= SBB RABe 520 =

Electric multiple unit

RABe 520
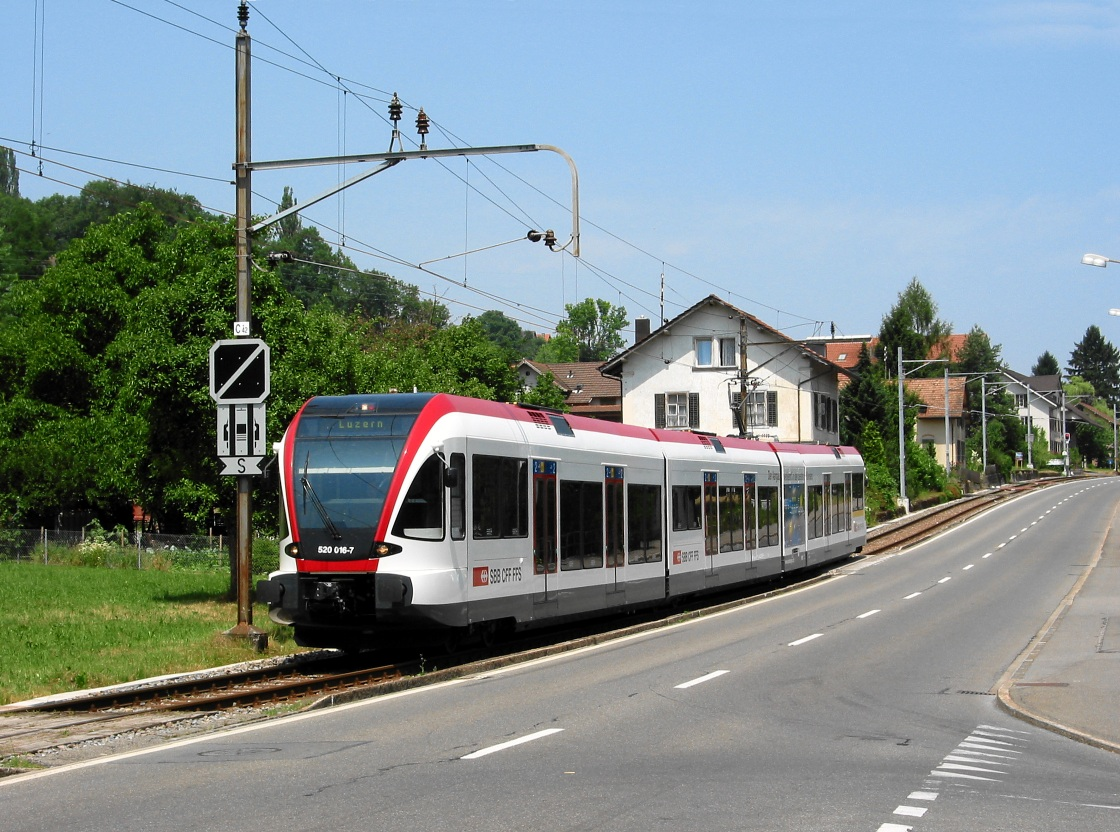
- A RABe 520 in Beinwil am See
- Manufacturer: Stadler Rail
- Constructed: 2002
- Number built: 17
- Formation: 3 cars + 1 engine car
- Capacity: 1st class : 12; 2nd class : 127; Standing: 269
- Operators: SBB CFF FFS

Specifications
- Train length: 53.434 m (175 ft 3.7 in)
- Width: 2.650 m (8 ft 8.3 in)
- Height: 3.850 m (12 ft 7.6 in)
- Doors: 6 per side
- Maximum speed: 115 km/h (71 mph)
- Weight: 91.1 t (90 long tons; 100 short tons)
- Power output: 760 kW (1,020 hp)
- Power supply: Overhead catenary
- Electric system(s): 15 kV 16.7 Hz
- Current collection: Pantograph
- UIC classification: 2'Bo 2'2'
- Track gauge: 1,435 mm (4 ft 8 1/2 in)

The RABe 520 is an electric multiple unit used since 2002 by the Swiss Federal Railways. It is based on the Stadler GTW 2/8 model.

== Features ==
The drive module at the middle of the train is able to develop a power of 760 kW, making it able to travel at 115 km/h (71 mph). The RABe 520 is slightly different from the standard Stadler GTW model: it has a greater capacity, a narrower body and an increased number of doors.

== Service ==
As a quite small train, the RABe 520 is used on regional and S-Bahn lines. It was first designed for the Seetalbahn line between Lenzburg and Luzern, and was also used on lines from and to both locations. The RABe 520 gradually saw use on other lines. As of 2010, it can be seen on these routes :

- S-Bahn Luzern :
  - Luzern - Lenzburg (S9)
  - Luzern - Brunnen (S3)
- S-Bahn Aargau :
  - Lenzburg – Zofingen (S28)
  - Lenzburg/Othmarsingen – Rotkreuz (S26)
  - Aarau - Turgi

== See also ==
- List of stock used by Swiss Federal Railways
- Thurbo
