= Stadler WINK =

Train

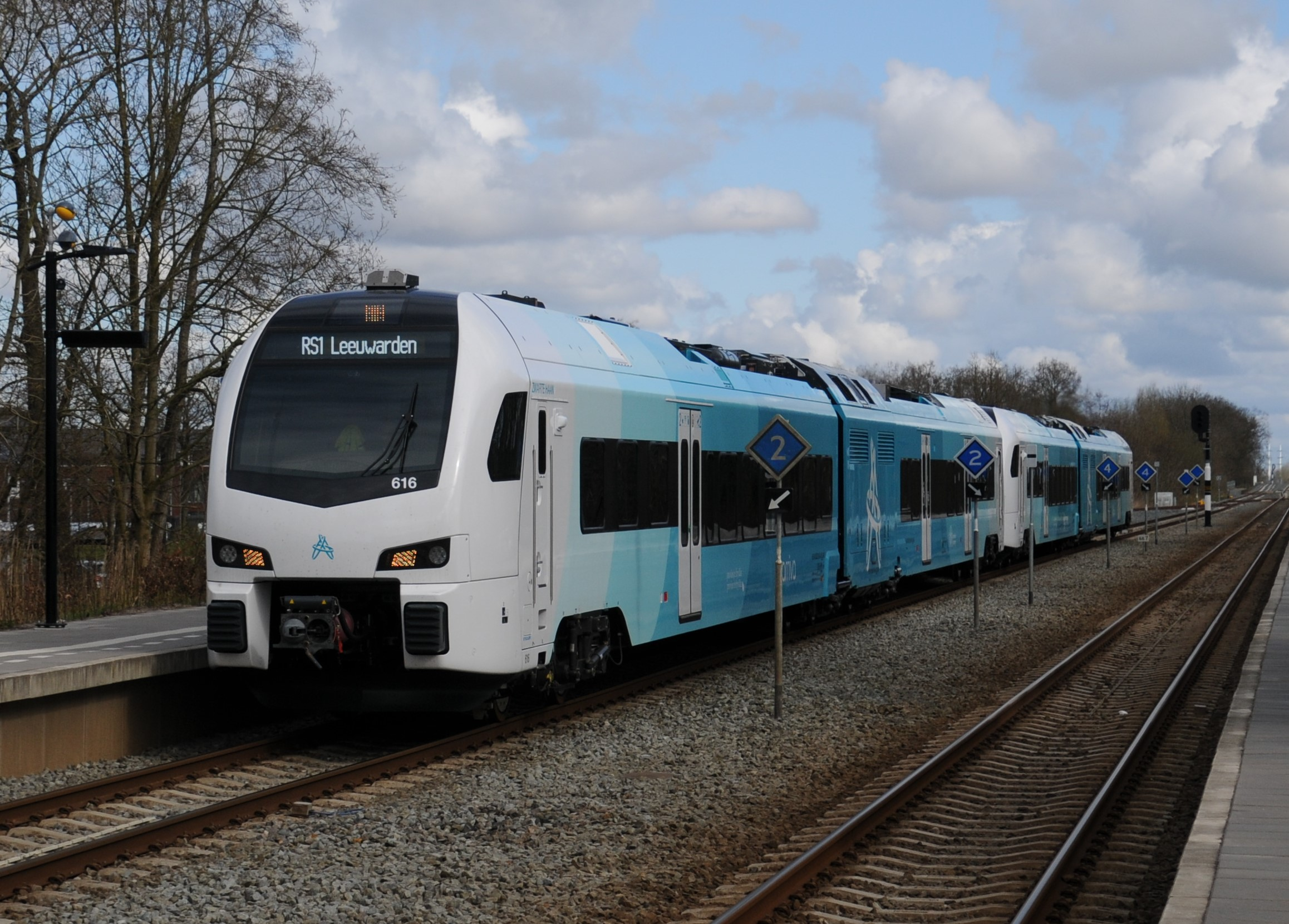
- Stadler WINK at Zuidhorn in April 2021
- In service: 2021–
- Manufacturer: Stadler Rail
- Entered service: 2021
- Number under construction: 18
- Capacity: 250
- Operator: Arriva
- Depot: Leeuwarden
- Line served: Noordelijke Nevenlijnen

Specifications
- Car body construction: Aluminium
- Car length: 55.5 m (182 ft 1 in) (Arriva spec; customizable)
- Width: 2.82 m (9 ft 3 in)
- Height: 4.12 m (13 ft 6 1/4 in)
- Maximum speed: 160 km/h (99 mph)
- Prime mover: Deutz diesel engine
- Electric system: Batteries
- Safety system: ATB-NG
- Track gauge: 1,435 mm (4 ft 8 1/2 in) standard gauge

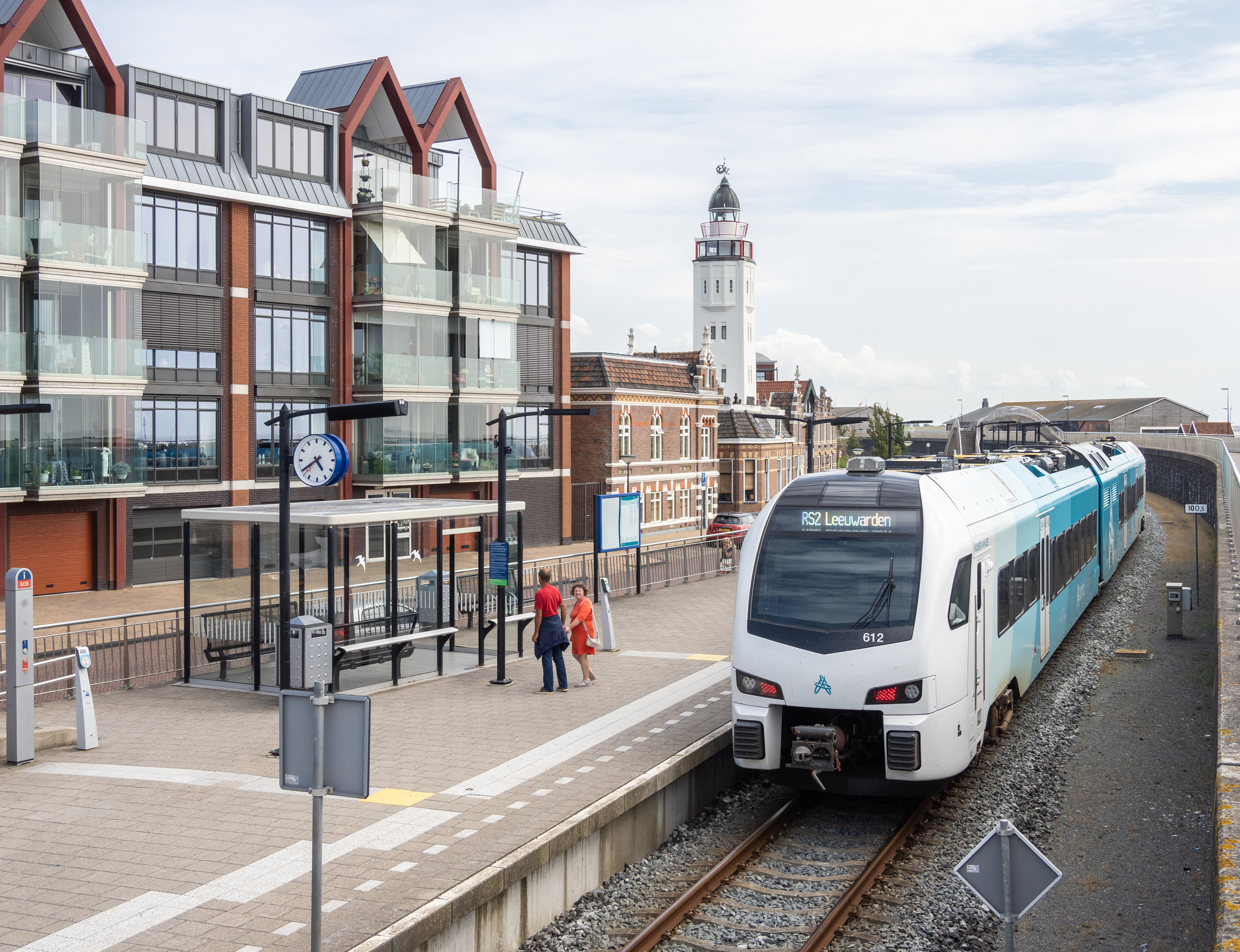
Stadler WINK at station Harlingen Haven

The Stadler WINK (German: Wandelbarer Innovativer Nahverkehrs-Kurzzug, lit. 'convertible, innovative short train for local transport') is a hybrid multiple unit railcar designed and built by Stadler Rail of Switzerland that entered service in the Netherlands in 2021.

== Service history ==
The WINK was unveiled in November 2017 when European operator Arriva announced an order for 18 trainsets, which it planned to place in service in the northern Netherlands beginning in 2020.

Upon delivery, repair and maintenance of the trainsets will be performed by Stadler in Leeuwarden through 2035. The first trainsets were put into service on 12 April 2021.

== Current Operations ==
The Stadler WINK is currently operating in the following services:

Series	Train type	Route	Rolling stock	Notes
37000 38000	Stoptrein/Sneltrein RS3/RE3	Leeuwarden - Mantgum - Sneek Noord - Sneek	Mostly WINK	
37100	Stoptrein RS3	Leeuwarden - Mantgum - Sneek Noord - Sneek - IJlst - Workum - Hindeloopen - Koudum-Molkwerum - Stavoren	WINK	
37200	Stoptrein RS2	Leeuwarden - Deinum - Dronryp - Franeker - Harlingen - Harlingen Haven	WINK	
37300	Sneltrein RE1	Groningen - Zuidhorn - Buitenpost - Feanwâlden - Leeuwarden	WINK in combination with GTW (exclusively GTW’s on weekends)	
37400	Stoptrein RS1	Groningen - Zuidhorn - Grijpskerk - Buitenpost - De Westereen - Feanwâlden - Hurdegaryp - Leeuwarden Camminghaburen - Leeuwarden	WINK in combination with GTW (exclusively GTW’s on weekends)	

== Design ==
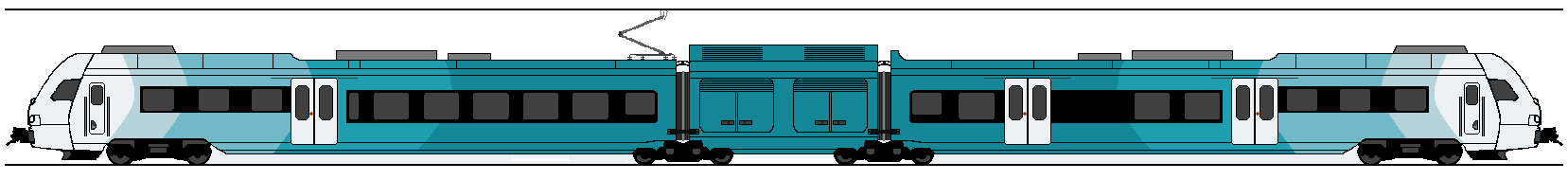

The WINK is a derivative design of Stadler's FLIRT railcars that is intended for service on lightly travelled lines. It has an aluminium carbody that can be customized in length by the customer, and can be powered by either diesel or electric powertrains with supplemental on board batteries. Arriva units were delivered with Deutz diesel engines, running on vegetable oil fuel, and batteries charged by regenerative braking; the engines are planned to be replaced by additional batteries once electrification is installed over part of their route. Each trainset can carry about 275 passengers, with seating for 150, and has a top speed of up to 160 kilometres per hour (99 mph) depending on customer specification.
