= Stadler GTW =

Articulated railcar

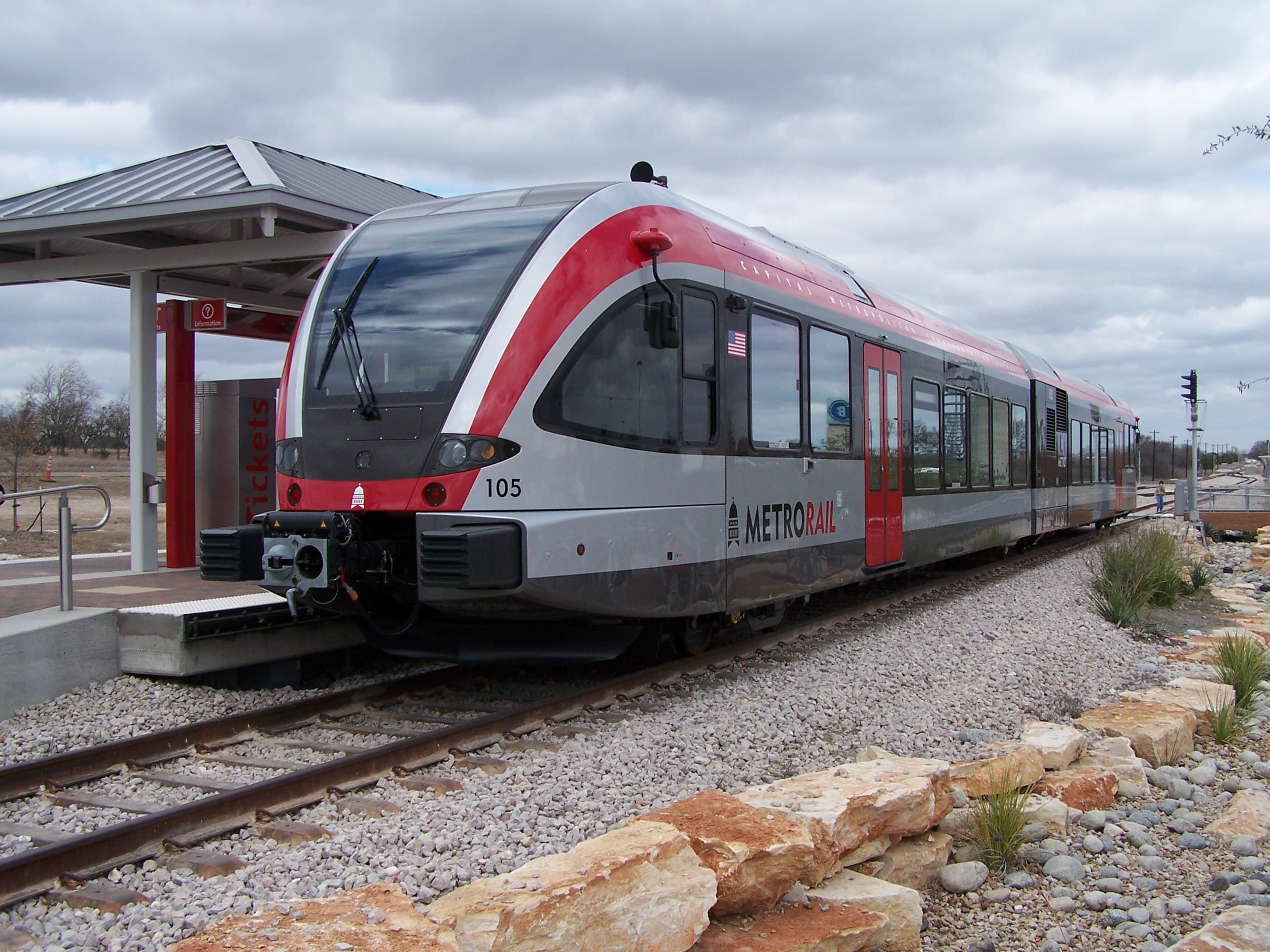
- Stadler GTW Railcar on CapMetro Rail in Austin, Texas

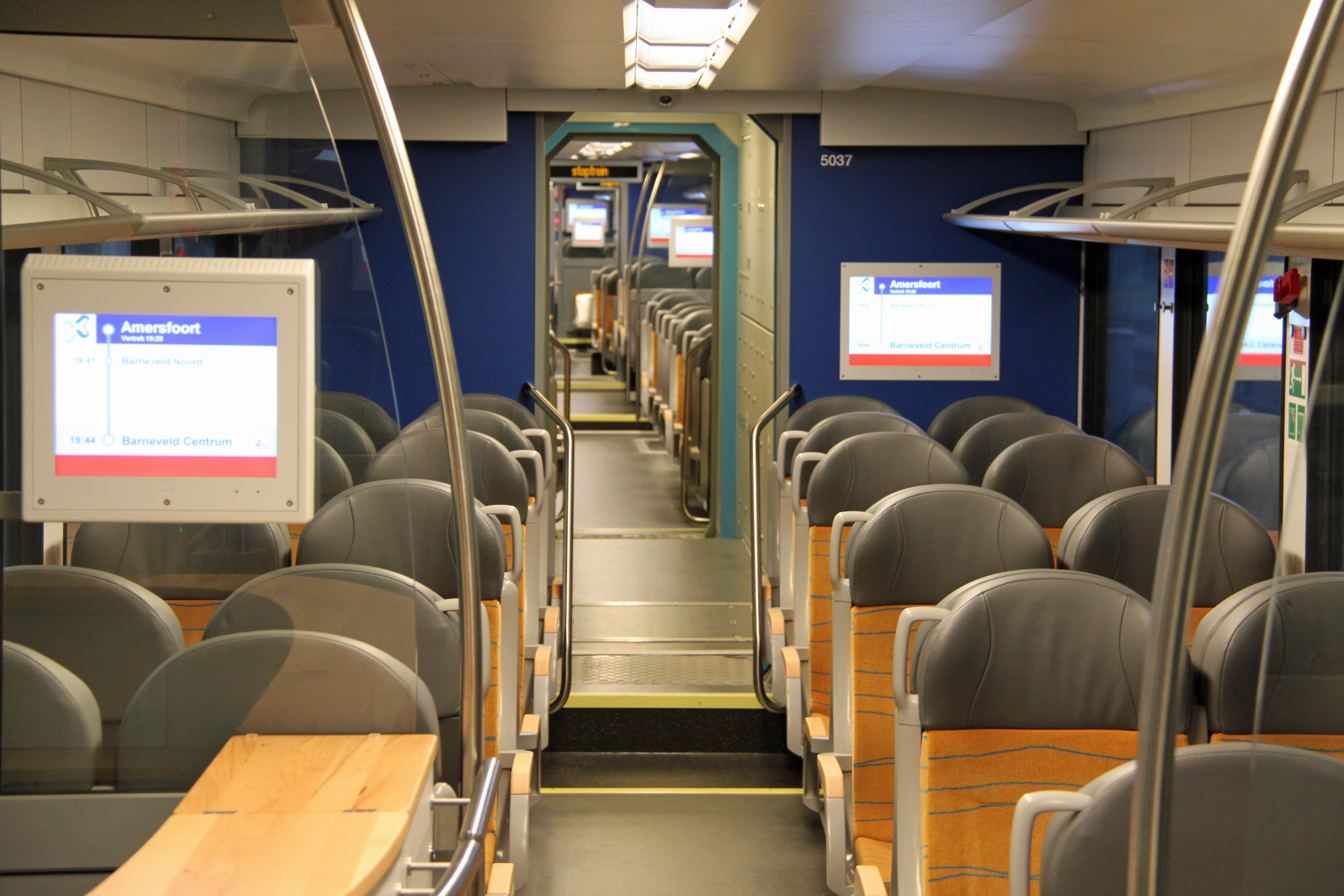
- The path through the drive container of a GTW 2/8 from Connexxion (Netherlands)
- Manufacturer: Stadler Rail
- Constructed: 1995–2017
- Diagram

Specifications
- Train length: 30–39 m (98 ft 5 1/8 in – 127 ft 11 3/8 in) (GTW 2/6); approx. 53 m (173 ft 10 5/8 in) (GTW 2/8)
- Width: 2.2 or 2.7 m (7 ft 2 5/8 in or 8 ft 10 1/4 in) (meter gauge); 3.0 or 3.1 m (9 ft 10 1/8 in or 10 ft 2 in) (standard gauge or Iberian gauge)
- Doors: 4
- Articulated sections: 3
- Maximum speed: 115–140 km/h (71–87 mph)
- Weight: 37–62 t (36.4–61.0 long tons; 40.8–68.3 short tons) (GTW 2/6); 72.4 t (71.3 long tons; 79.8 short tons) (GTW 2/8)
- UIC classification: 2′+Bo′+2′ (GTW 2/6); 2′+Bo′+2′+2′ (GTW 2/8); 2′+Bo′+Bo′+2′ (GTW 4/8); 2′+Bo′+2′+2′+Bo′+2′ (GTW 4/12)
- AAR wheel arrangement: 2-B-2 (GTW 2/6)
- Safety system: EN 15227
- Multiple working: up to four trains
- Track gauge: 1,000 mm (3 ft 3 3/8 in) metre gauge; 1,435 mm (4 ft 8 1/2 in) standard gauge; 1,668 mm (5 ft 5 21/32 in) Iberian gauge

The Stadler GTW (German: Gelenktriebwagen, lit. 'articulated railcar') is an articulated railcar for local transport made by Stadler Rail of Switzerland. The vehicles can be built for metre, standard and Iberian gauges and can use diesel or electric power supply. Variants have also been produced for use on rack railways. 551 units had been sold by 2011 and GTW vehicles are in use in Austria, France, Germany, Czech Republic, Greece, Italy, the Netherlands, Slovakia, Switzerland and the United States.

== History ==
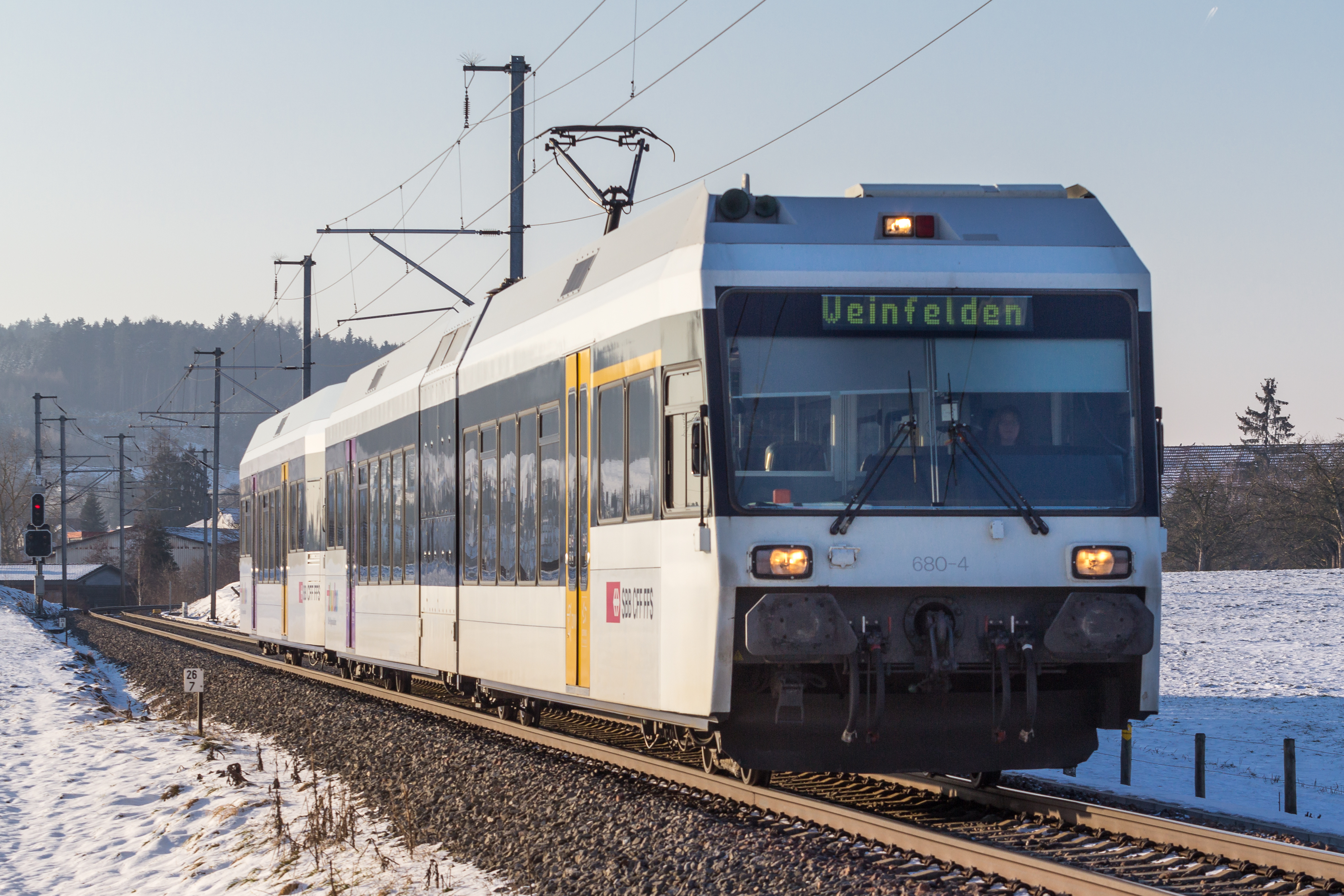
THURBO RABe 526 680–4, First Generation GTW

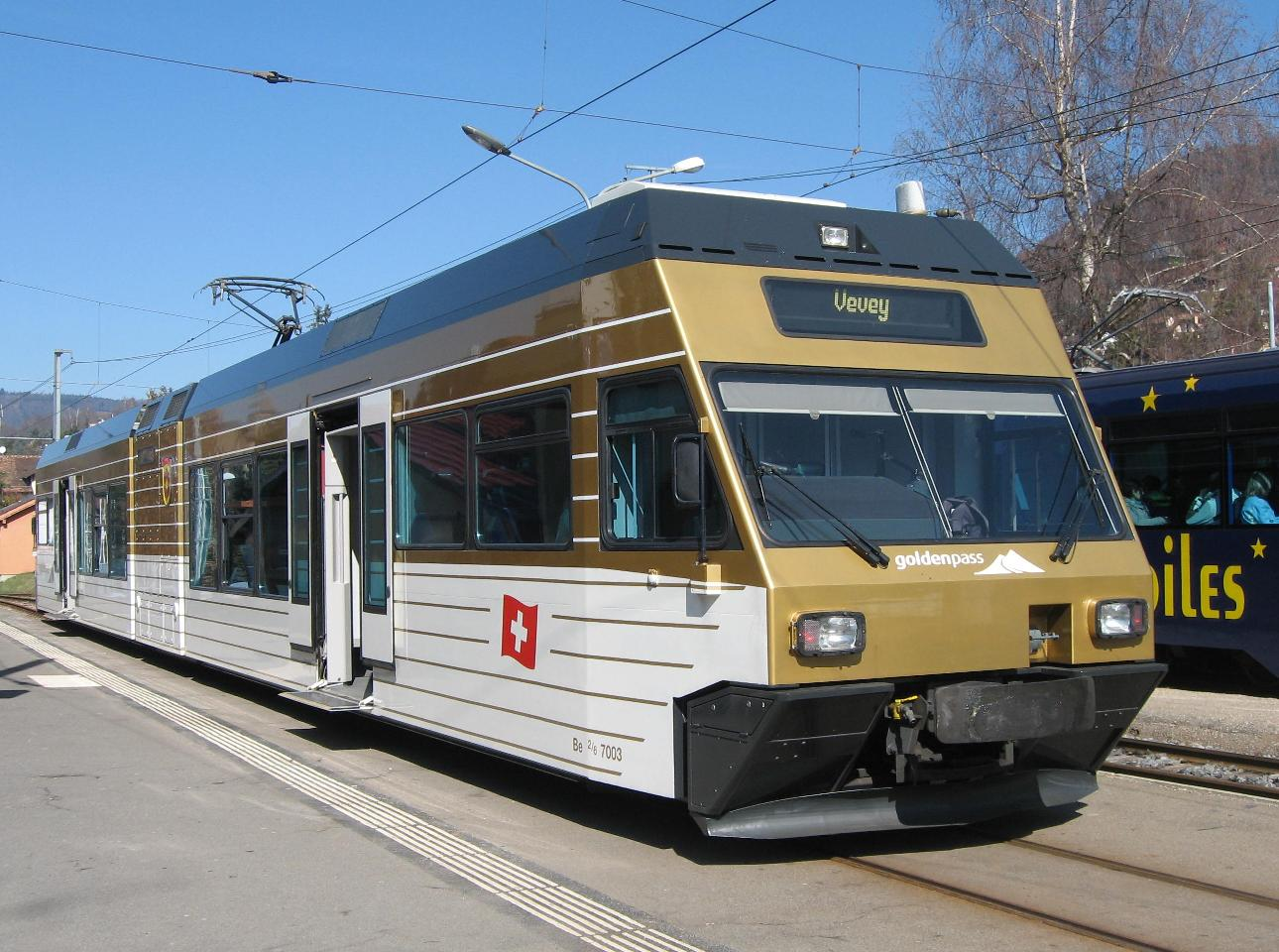
First Generation: Goldenpass Be 2/6 7003 Blonay at Blonay (CEV)

The first GTW railcars were metre-gauge electric vehicles for the Biel–Täuffelen–Ins-Bahn (BTI) and Chemins de fer électriques Veveysans (CEV) in Switzerland. Eleven trains were ordered in 1994 and delivered in 1997. The traction equipment was located in a central power unit instead of being mounted on the roof, which meant that the railways did not have to modify their workshops to allow access to the train roofs. The car bodies used a lightweight bolted construction to reduce operating costs.

Stadler presented the first standard-gauge diesel-electric prototype in 1995, intended for the German market. After testing, this unit was acquired by the Mittelthurgau-Bahn (MThB) along with two more identical units for use on the Radolfzell–Mengen railway. A further 30 units were ordered by Hessische Landesbahn (HLB) and 66 by DB Regio. The passenger sections for the HLB and DB trains were built by DWA Bautzen and have fibreglass cabs with a much rounder shape than those of the MThB trains.

The second generation can be easily distinguished by its rounded cab made from FRP (glass-fiber-reinforced plastic). A batch of 12 trains went to Athens (Greece) in metre gauge (ordered in 1999, delivered since 2003). With the second generation the available options for GTW trains expanded. Metre-gauge vehicles could be ordered with 2.2 or 2.7 m (7 ft 2 5/8 in or 8 ft 10 1/4 in) width and standard-gauge vehicles in a 3.0 or 3.1 m (9 ft 10 1/8 in or 10 ft 2 in) width. Vehicles could also be expanded with a third passenger section.

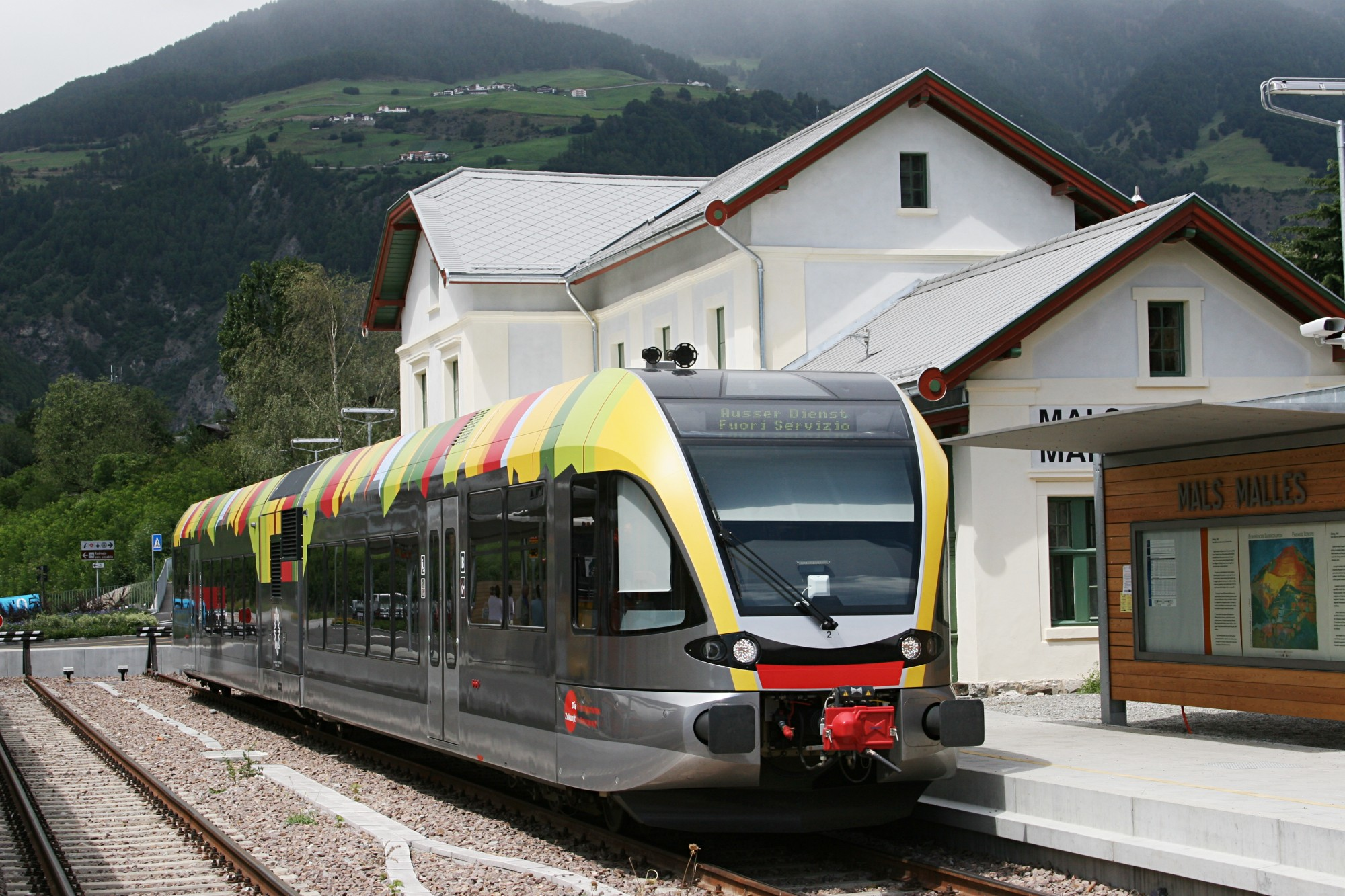
Third Generation: Stadler GTW 2/6 (ATR 100) diesel electric for Societá Automobilistica Dolomiti (SAD), used on the Ferrovia della Val Venosta, at Mals station in Italy

The third generation has minor modifications to the cab shape and major changes to the power module. The electric variant's power was increased to 700 to 800 kW (940 to 1,070 hp), instead of up to 520 kW (700 hp), and the diesel-electric variant was available with two generators instead of one. This allowed a higher maximum speed, which was a requirement of Italian customers. The concept impressed the Arriva operator in the Netherlands, which ordered 43 trains in 2005 asking for some further developments. The modified type sold well to other operators in the Netherlands and abroad, as both DMU and EMU variants.

The fourth generation was modified to comply with the EN 15227 crashworthiness requirements, which applied from 2008. In the same year much of the production was moved to the Stadler's factory in Siedlce, Poland.

The GTW became heavier over time due to increased crashworthiness requirements. It weighed 483 kg (1,065 lb) per seat in 1998, increasing to 660 kg (1,460 lb) per seat by 2010. This was higher than a FLIRT ET 22 from 2007, at 639 kg (1,409 lb) per seat. As a consequence, its biggest customers, Arriva and Connexxion, switched to the FLIRT models for subsequent deliveries in 2012. Only a few replacements for diesel-electric and cog-wheel trains followed thereafter. For those application areas Stadler introduced the WINK concept (or Flirtino) in 2018. FLIRT and WINK are the next-generation models that can support updated crashworthiness requirements. Like Stadler's GTW family of multiple units, WINK has a central power module containing the energy generation, traction and auxiliary systems, while the frame and other parts are derived from the FLIRT models.

== Technical description ==
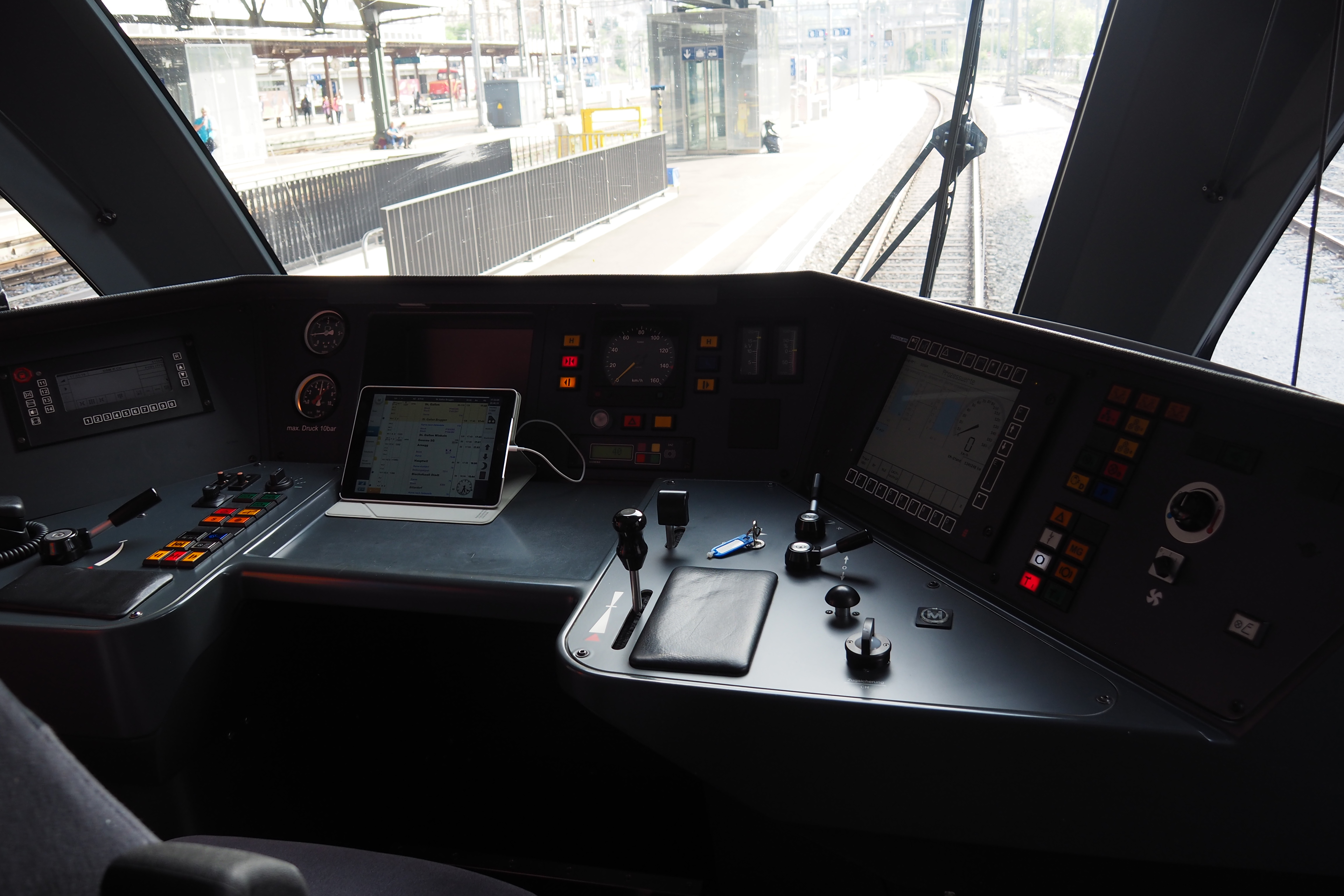
Driver's cab of Thurbo RABe 526 799 at Sankt Gallen train station

Unlike high-floor railcars, with traction equipment under the floor, or other low-floor designs, with some equipment on the roof, the GTW is driven by a central power module with two powered axles. The three-car variant has two lightweight passenger modules, each with one bogie, resting on the power module and is designated GTW 2/6 because two of its six axles are powered. Longer four-car GTW 2/8 vehicles have an extra passenger section on one side of the powerpack. Two three-car units with cabs at only one end and gangway connections at the other form a GTW 4/12. For operational flexibility up to four GTWs can be operated in multiple.

The passenger sections do not need to carry any traction equipment and use a lightweight aluminium construction. The power module is constructed from welded steel. They have a low floor over most of their length, except over the bogies. The modular design of the GTW means that the end modules can be delivered with screw couplings and buffers or with Scharfenberg couplers.

All of the usual comforts to be expected in a modern local network railcar are provided, such as air conditioning, a multi-purpose area, vacuum toilets (in a washroom suitable for the disabled) and a passenger information system.

Although the traction is good for the powered bogies, the concept has the same problem as other light railcars with the brakes on the non-powered axles having lower grip than traditional railcars. This has led to restrictions when leaves are on the rails as the wheel slide protection can not fully compensate the effect. The central power module has limits with heat dissipation as well which can lead to situations where the power output needs to be limited.

=== Propulsion ===
GTWs can be diesel–electric or electric-powered (via overhead wires or third rail). The first diesel-powered units (for MThB, DB and HLB) had a 550 kW (740 hp) MTU engine. Later units (for New Jersey Transit and Vinschgerbahn) use two 390 kW (520 hp) MAN engines. Electric propulsion modules with 600 to 1,100 kW (800 to 1,480 hp) are available. IGBT based traction converters together with asynchronous motors are used as drive units. The traction converters are manufactured by ABB at their site in Turgi, Switzerland and the motors by TSA Austria.

== Operations ==
=== Austria ===
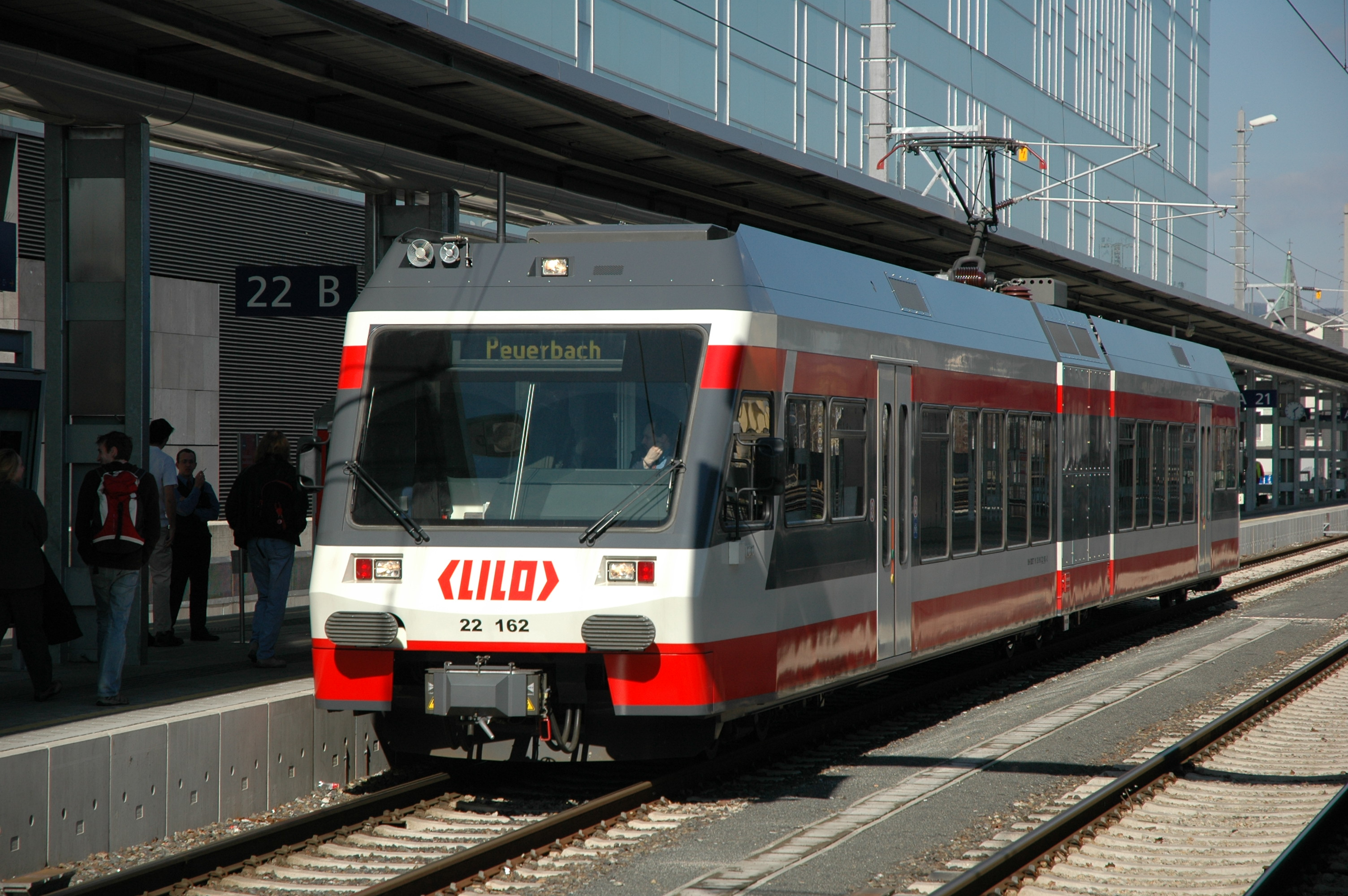
GTW electric railcar of LILO

In 1998 the Linzer Lokalbahn (LILO) placed an order for eight electric GTW trains. One train was a dual-voltage vehicle equipped to operate on LILO's 750 V DC electrification system and the ÖBB 15 kV AC system and the other seven were for DC electrification only. In 2003 LILO ordered another six dual-voltage trains and the remaining seven older trains were converted for dual-voltage operation. This allowed LILO services to run into Linz Hauptbahnhof using the 15 V AC electrification.

Steiermärkischen Landesbahnen ordered six GTW railcars in 2009 for use on the Styria S-Bahn. Three are diesel and three electric, but they use as many common parts as possible to reduce maintenance costs. Up to four vehicles can be operated in multiple, including mixed combinations of diesel and electric units.

Graz-Köflacher Bahn und Busbetrieb operates 13 diesel GTW 2/8 trains. They entered service in 2010–2011 due to rising passenger numbers and to replace nearly 30-year-old vehicles.

=== France ===
The Panoramique des Dômes rack railway in France uses four GTW 2/6 since opening in 2012.

=== Greece ===
In Greece, Hellenic Train operates two variants of the Stadler GTW 2/6 (known also incorrectly as railbus), owned by OSE. It is the main suburban DMU and there are two variants, for metre and the standard gauge. The metre-gauge variant (OSE class 4501) operates in the Suburban of Patras (Proastiakos) and the tourist line of Katakolo–Pyrgos–Ancient Olympia. The standard-gauge variant (OSE class 560) operates on the Athens–Lianokladi regional service and the Lianokladi–Lamia–Stylida line (which is referred to as Proastiakos Lamias). In the near future, it is expected they will operate on different lines due to the electrification of the main network.

=== Italy ===
In Italy, GTW are used by some regional railways. The Vinschgerbahn (Bolzano), operated by Societá Automobilistica Dolomiti (SAD) was the first to order twelve vehicles in 2004, extended by eight vehicles of the same type for the Udine–Cividale line (FUC) in Padova, also in 2004.

Operators and classes of GTW in Italy are:

- ATR 100: Societá Automobilistica Dolomiti (SAD), Trentino Alto Adige
- ATR 110: Ferrovie Udine Cividale (FUC), Friuli
- ATR 110, ATR 120: Sistemi Territoriali (ST), Veneto
- ATR 115, ATR 125: Ferrovie Nord Milano, Lombardia
- ATR 200: Ferrovie del Sud Est (FSE), Puglia

=== Netherlands ===
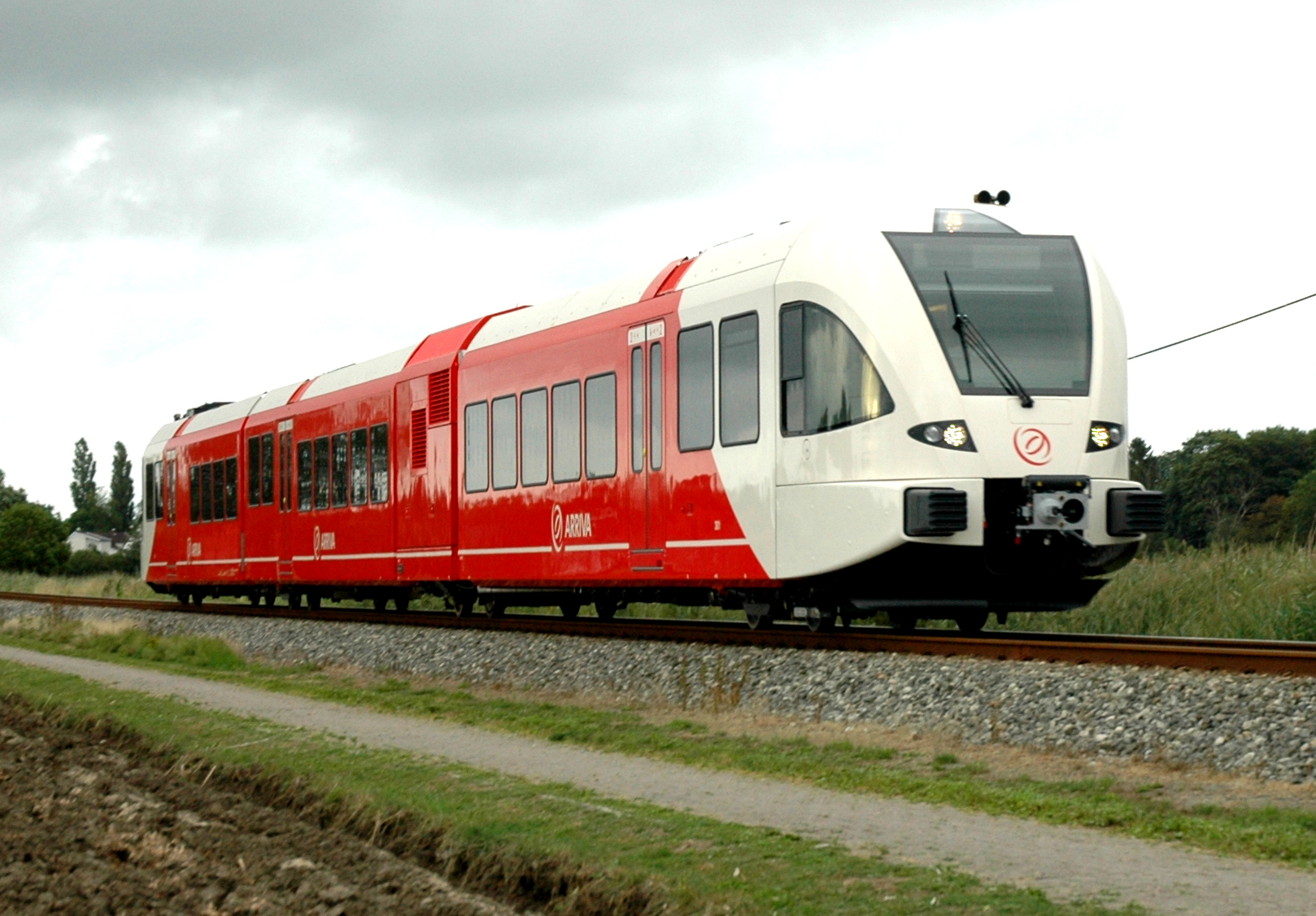
Arriva train in Bunde

In 2005 the multinational transport company Arriva ordered 43 GTW diesel railcars (16 GTW 2/6 and 27 GTW 2/8) for use on regional services in Groningen and Friesland. The vehicles are used on the lines: Leer (Germany)–Groningen, Delfzijl–Groningen, Leeuwarden–Groningen, Roodeschool/Eemshaven–Sauwerd, Veendam–Zuidbroek, Leeuwarden–Stavoren, Leeuwarden–Harlingen Haven. From December 2012, Arriva has also used diesel GTWs on Tiel-Arhnem, Arnhem–Winterswijk, Winterswijk–Zutphen and Zutphen–Apeldoorn.

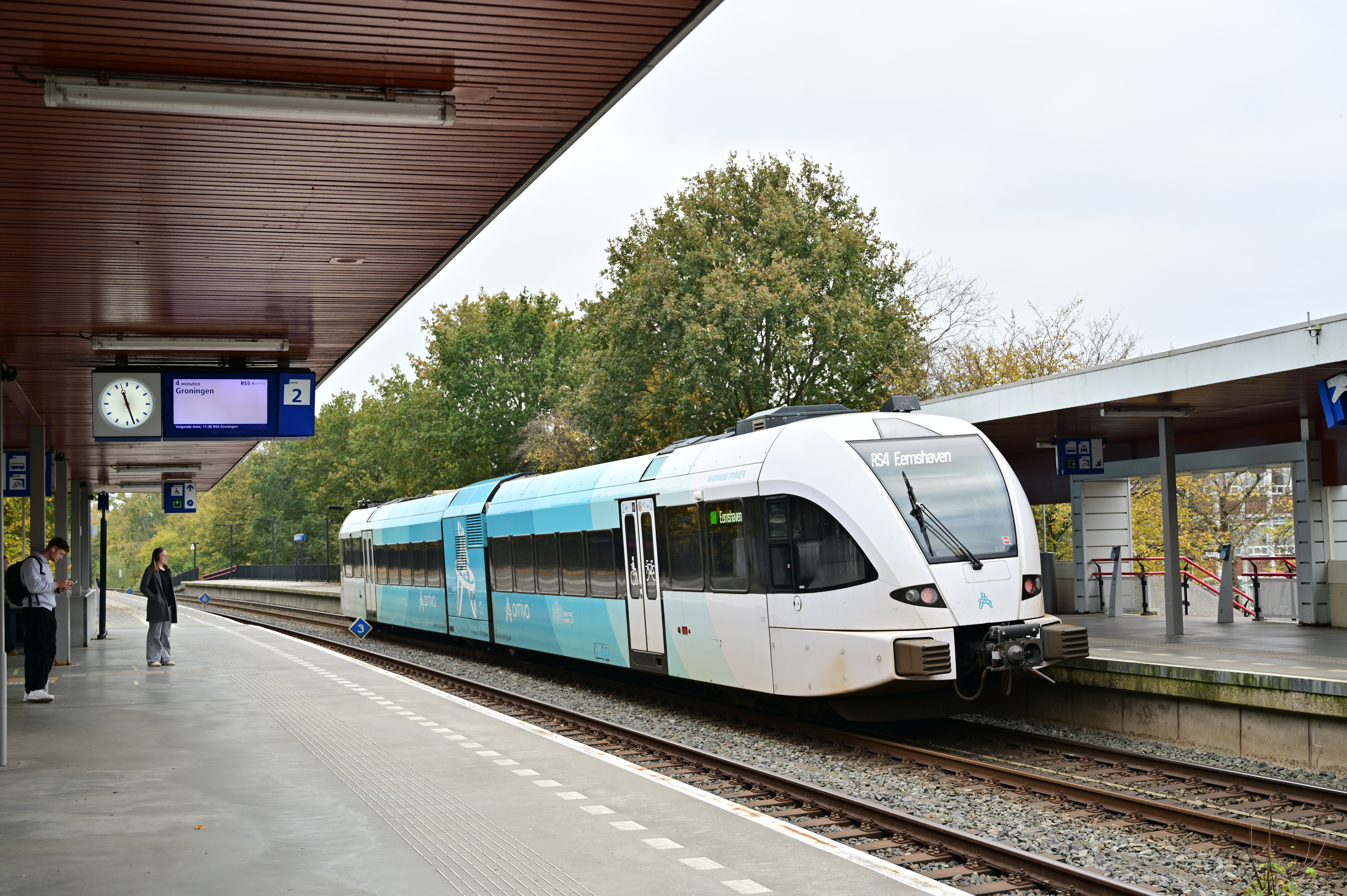
Arriva GTW departing Groningen Noord towards Eemshaven

In December 2024, trainsets 314 and 350 were moved from Groningen-Friesland and restickered to fulfil services on the Zutphen-Hengelo-Oldenzaal line in combination with Alstom LINT 41 trainsets.

The electric GTW are used on the Dordrecht–Gorinchem–Geldermalsen line (operated by QBuzz since 2018) and from December 2012 also on the Zwolle–Emmen line. Since December 2022 electric GTWs are also used on the weekly Arriva night train service between Groningen and Schiphol Airport.

Arriva Limburg uses electric GTW on the Kerkrade Centrum–Heerlen–Maastricht Randwyck and Heerlen–Maastricht lines, and diesel units are used on the Roermond–Venlo–Nijmegen lines.

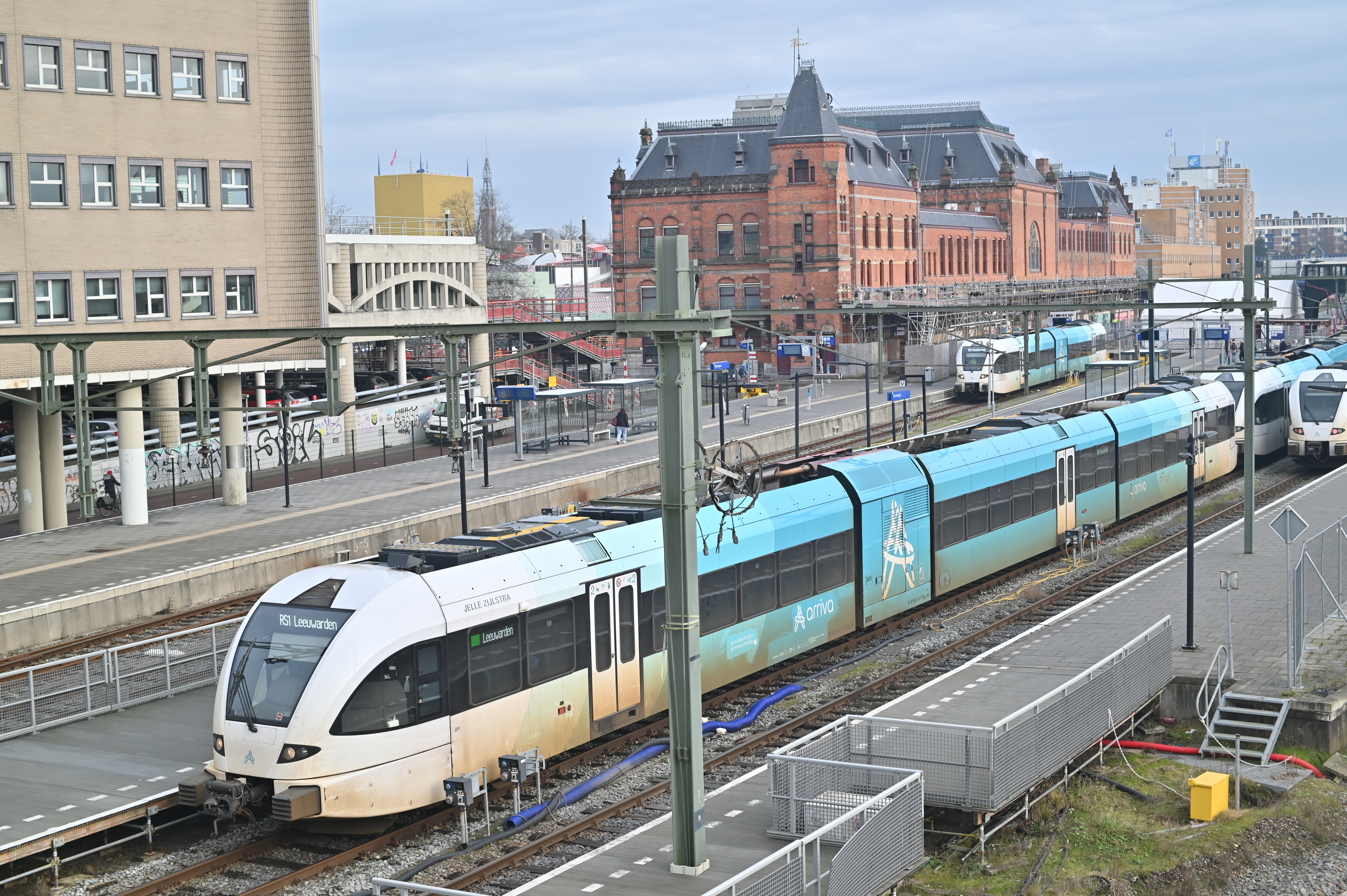
Arriva Stadler GTW in Groningen preparing to depart towards Leeuwarden

Connexxion used one electric GTW for the Barneveld Centrum–Amersfoort line. This GTW is transferred to the Vechtdallijnen from Arriva, Starting in December 2012 Connexxion also uses nine diesel GTWs for the Breng concession.

Trainset 306 is named Gerrit Krol.

=== Germany ===
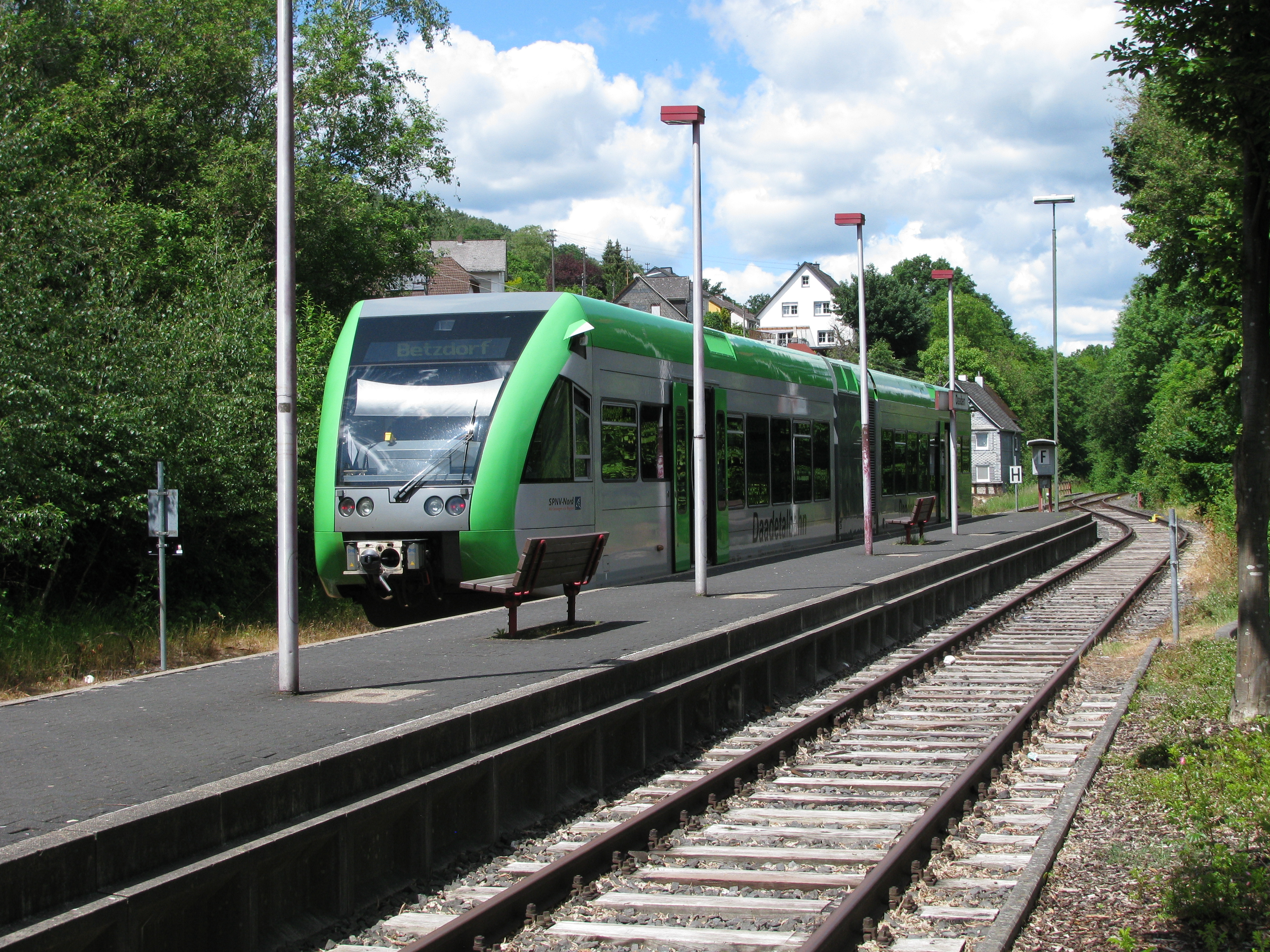
Stadler GTW of Westerwaldbahn GmbH in Daaden station

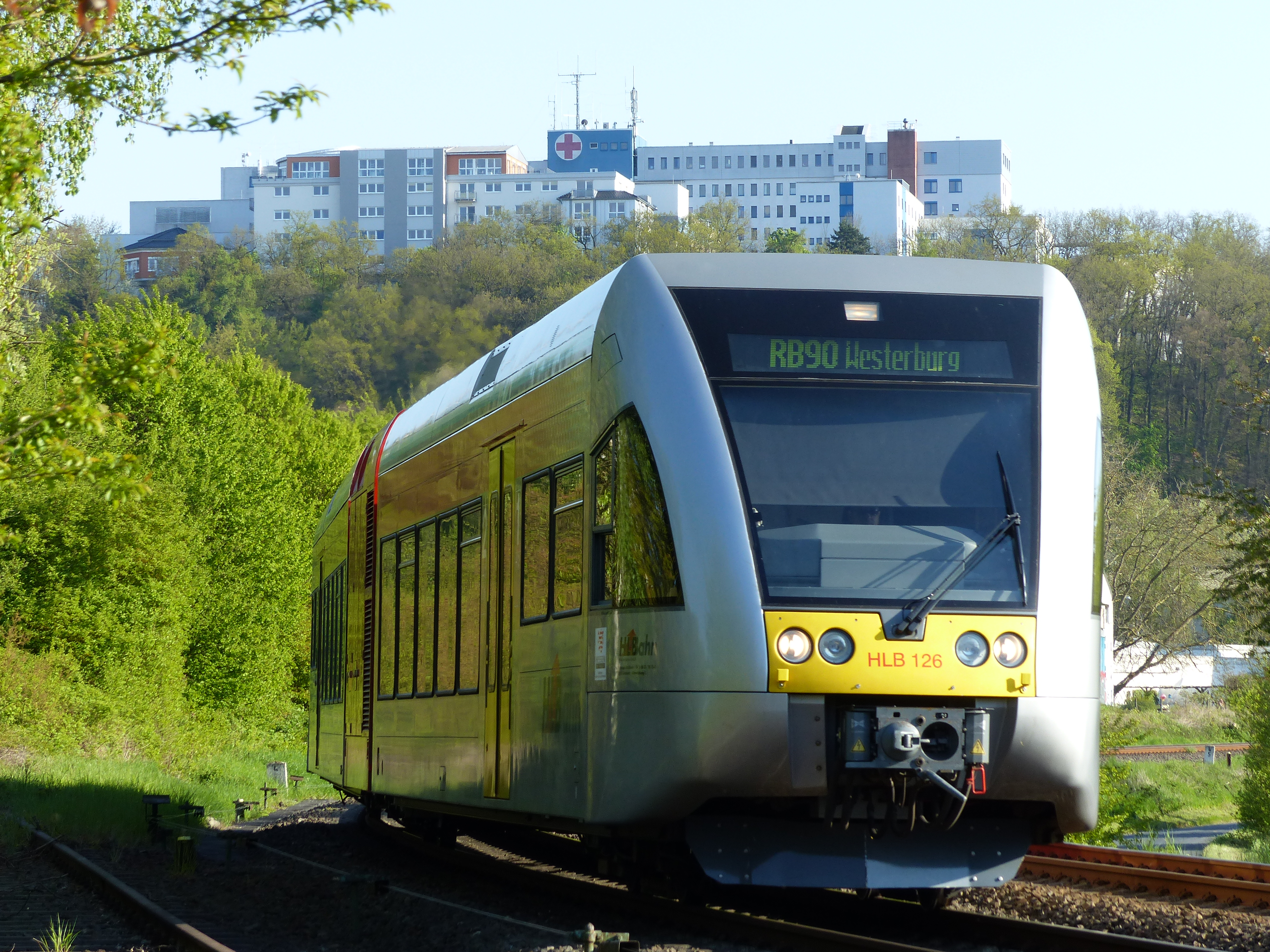
GTW of Hessische Landesbahn near Staffel station in Limburg

In Rhineland-Palatinate, Hesse and other states Stadler GTW vehicles are on service, especially in rural areas.

=== Slovakia ===
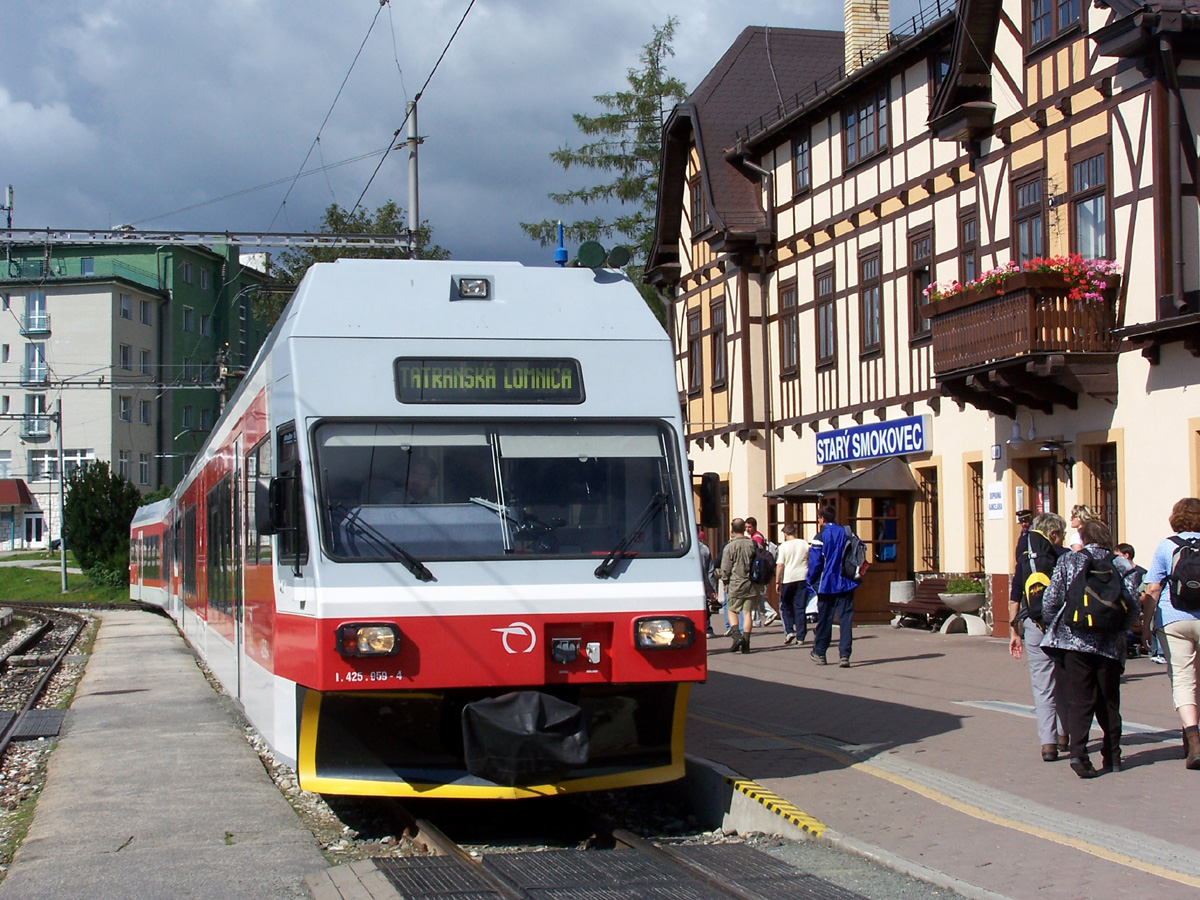
A Class 425.95 train at Starý Smokovec, Summer 2006

The Železničná spoločnosť Slovensko (ZSSK) use two classes of metre-gauge electric GTW on the Tatra Electric Railway. Fifteen Class 425.95 were delivered between 2000 and 2006. Five ZSSK Class 495.95 trains were delivered in 2021. These are capable of operating on both the Tatra Electric Railway and the Štrbské Pleso–Štrba rack railway.

ZSSK also operate standard-gauge diesel GTWs (ZSSK Class 840) in the Poprad region. From December 2020 these trains are also used on the Bratislava—Komárno line.

=== Spain ===
The Ferrocarrils de la Generalitat de Catalunya (FGC) purchased two diesel-powered, Iberian gauge trains for use on the Lleida–La Pobla Line. The trains are designated class 331 and entered service in 2016. A third GTW entered service in 2022.

FGC also operates seven narrow-gauge trains for their rack railway lines. The first five trains were purchased in 2000 for the Montserrat Rack Railway and the remaining two were ordered in 2001 for the Vall de Núria Rack Railway. These units are electric-powered using a pantograph installed on the central carriage. Additionally, the Nuria trains have a second pantograph in the front car to remove ice and snow from the overhead wires in colder seasons. Between 2020 and 2022, the two trains from the Núria line have been transferred to the Montserrat line.

=== Switzerland ===
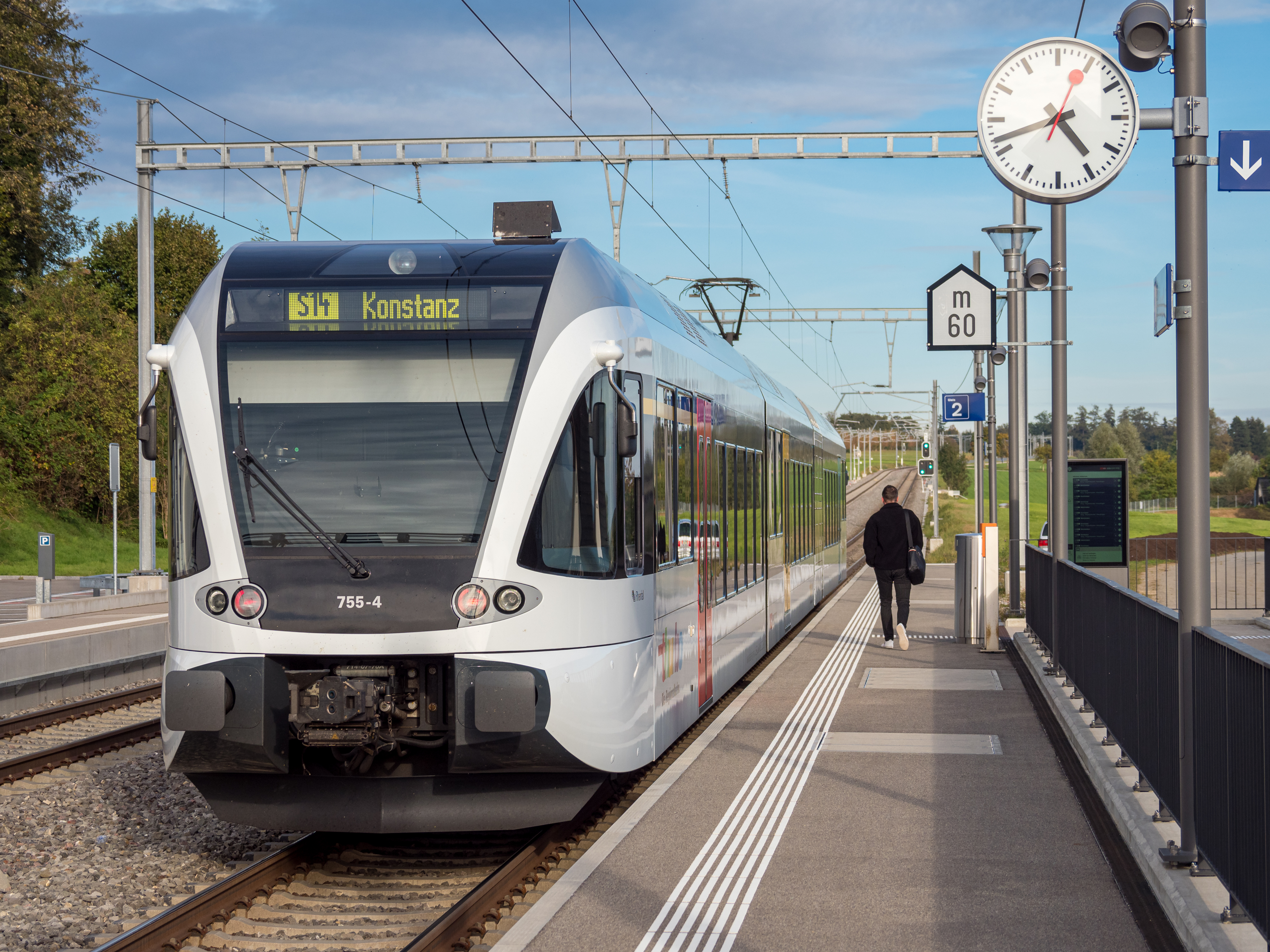
Thurbo RABe 526 at Kehlhof railway station

The Swiss Federal Railways has seventeen GTW 2/8 (RABe 520) for use on the Seetal railway line. These are a special version which is only 2.65 m (8 ft 8 in) wide because the line runs alongside a road.

Thurbo uses a large fleet of RABe 526 (GTW 2/6 and 2/8) on various lines in eastern Switzerland. Regionalverkehr Mittelland bought several GTW 2/6, which were later extended to GTW 2/8 and finally sold to the Swiss Federal Railways in 2013.

Various narrow gauge railways use GTWs: Chemins de fer du Jura, Biel–Täuffelen–Ins-Bahn, and the Transports Montreux–Vevey–Riviera.

=== United States ===
==== New Jersey ====
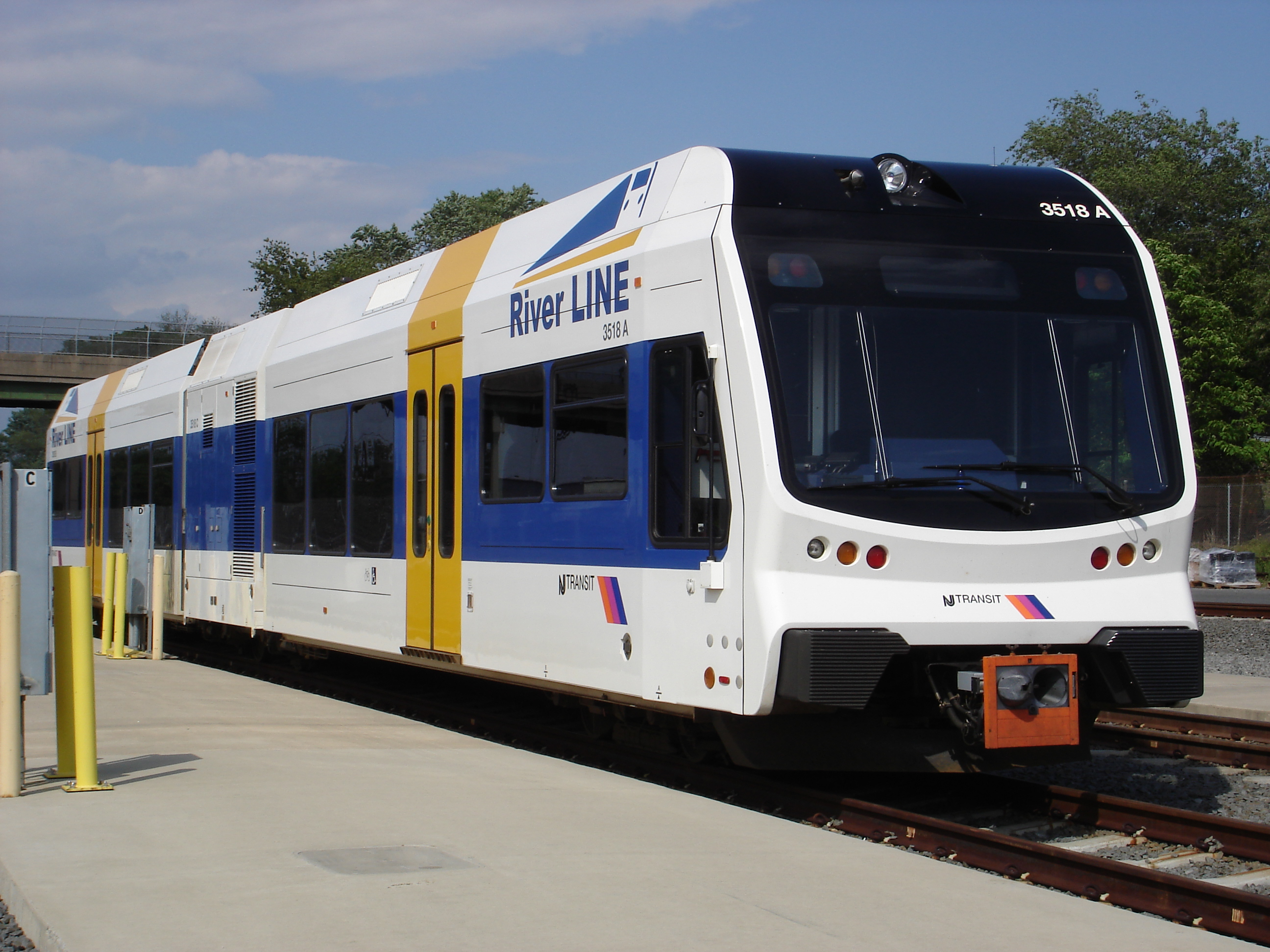
A US-spec Stadler GTW diesel railcar employed by the River Line light rail system in New Jersey

- River Line
  New Jersey Transit uses 20 diesel GTW vehicles on the 34-mile (55 km) River Line service between Trenton and Camden. The GTW offers a turning radius of only 40 m (130 ft) and is capable of street running, a capability used on the River Line in Camden.
- GTW trains are also planned to operate on SNJLR's Glassboro–Camden Line, currently in development.

==== Austin, Texas ====
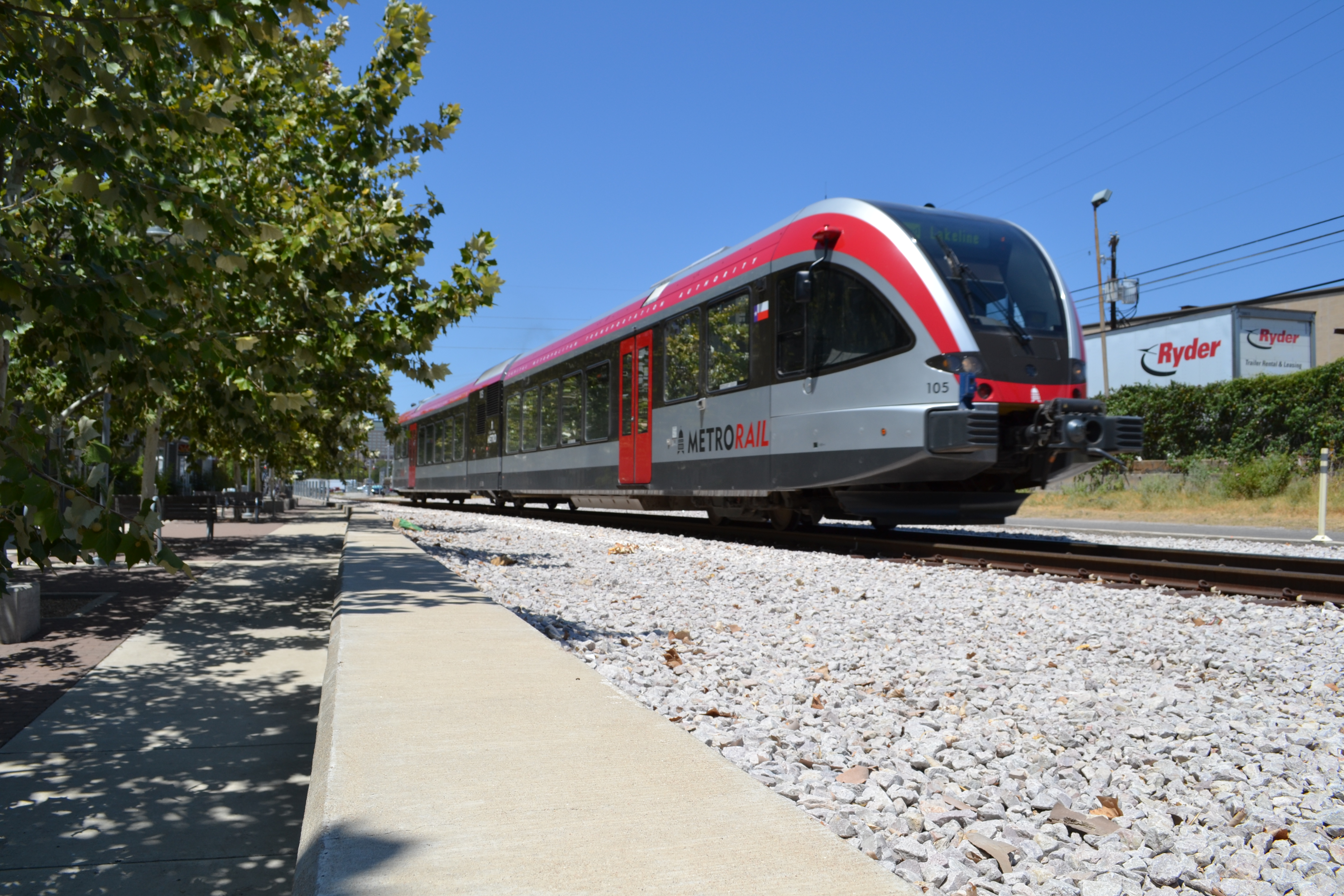
A Capital MetroRail Stadler GTW in its original livery

The Capital Metropolitan Transportation Authority (CapMetro) in Austin, Texas, uses ten Diesel rail vehicles of the type GTW 2/6 on its 32-mile (51.5 km) red line from Leander to Downtown Austin. CapMetro originally purchased six GTW DMUs from Stadler in 2005, but expanded their fleet to ten units in 2017. The four newer units feature LED destination signs instead of flip-dot signs, a slightly tweaked paint scheme (to better match the MetroBus paint scheme), and an updated engine car design that features a rounded top rather than an angular top as found on the older DMUs.

==== Denton County, Texas ====
The Denton County Transportation Authority (DCTA), announced on May 20, 2009, that it would purchase 11 GTW 2/6 articulated diesel multiple units (DMUs) for DCTA's 21-mile (34 km) corridor from Denton to Carrollton. This line connects with the Dallas Area Rapid Transit (DART) Green Line which extends from the Pleasant Grove neighborhood in southeast Dallas to northern Carrollton. The contract includes an option for up to 25 additional GTWs.

==== East Bay, California ====
In 2014, the Bay Area Rapid Transit District Authority ordered eight GTW 2/6 DMUs for the eBART standard gauge tracks (the rapid transit system uses a wide gauge) to Antioch, California with two options to procure six more. The first trains were delivered by June 2017, with revenue service starting in May 2018.

== See also ==
- Stadler FLIRT
- Nippon Sharyo DMU
