= Slovak Railways =

Slovak Railways or Slovak railways may refer to:

- Rail transport in Slovakia
- Railways of the Slovak Republic (Slovak: Železnice Slovenskej republiky), the state-owned railway infrastructure company of Slovakia
- Železničná spoločnosť Slovensko, Slovak state-owned passenger train company
- Železničná spoločnosť Cargo Slovakia, Slovak state-owned freight train company
