= Rail transport in Slovakia =

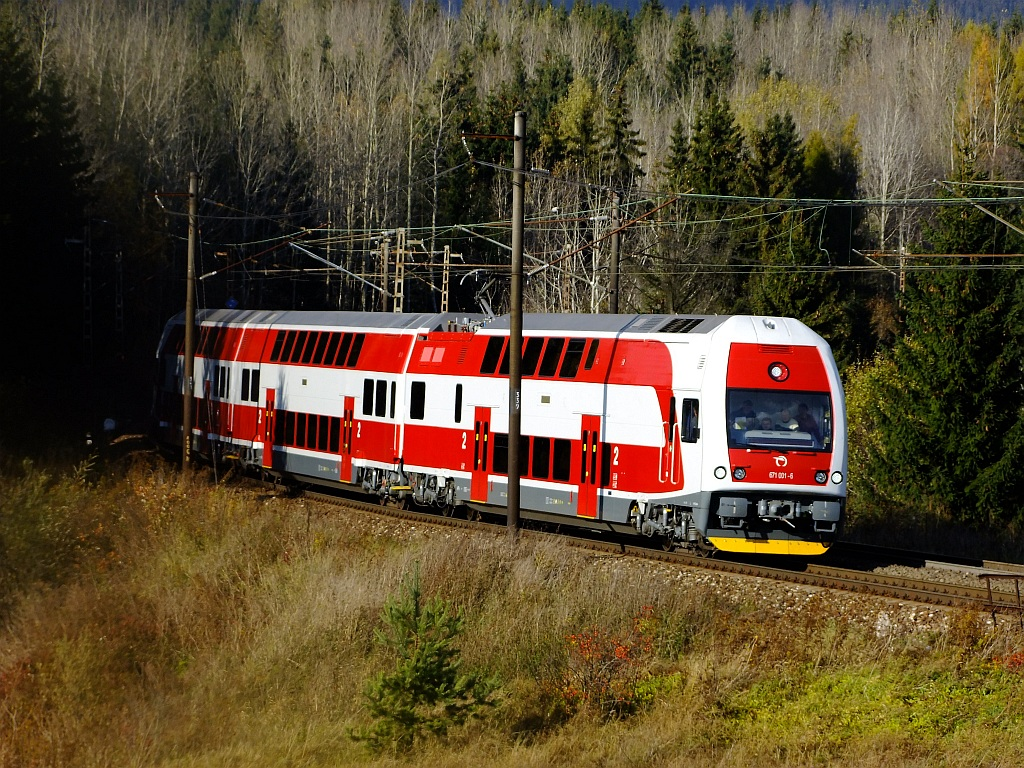
- A train of Železničná spoločnosť Slovensko

Operation
- Infrastructure company: Železnice Slovenskej republiky
- Major operators: ZSSK, Leo Express, RegioJet

Statistics
- Ridership: 72.47 million (2017)
- Passenger-distance: 3.76 billion (2017)
- Freight: 7 billion tonne-km (2017)

System length
- Total: 3,626 kilometres (2,253 mi)
- Double track: 1,017 km (632 mi)
- Electrified: 1,588 km (987 mi)

Track gauge
- Main: 1,435 mm (4 ft 8 1/2 in) standard gauge
- High-speed: 1,435 mm (4 ft 8 1/2 in)

Features
- No. of tunnels: 75
- Tunnel length: 43.23 kilometres (26.86 mi)
- Longest tunnel: Harmanec Tunnel; 4,698 metres (15,413 ft)
- No. of bridges: 2 321
Map
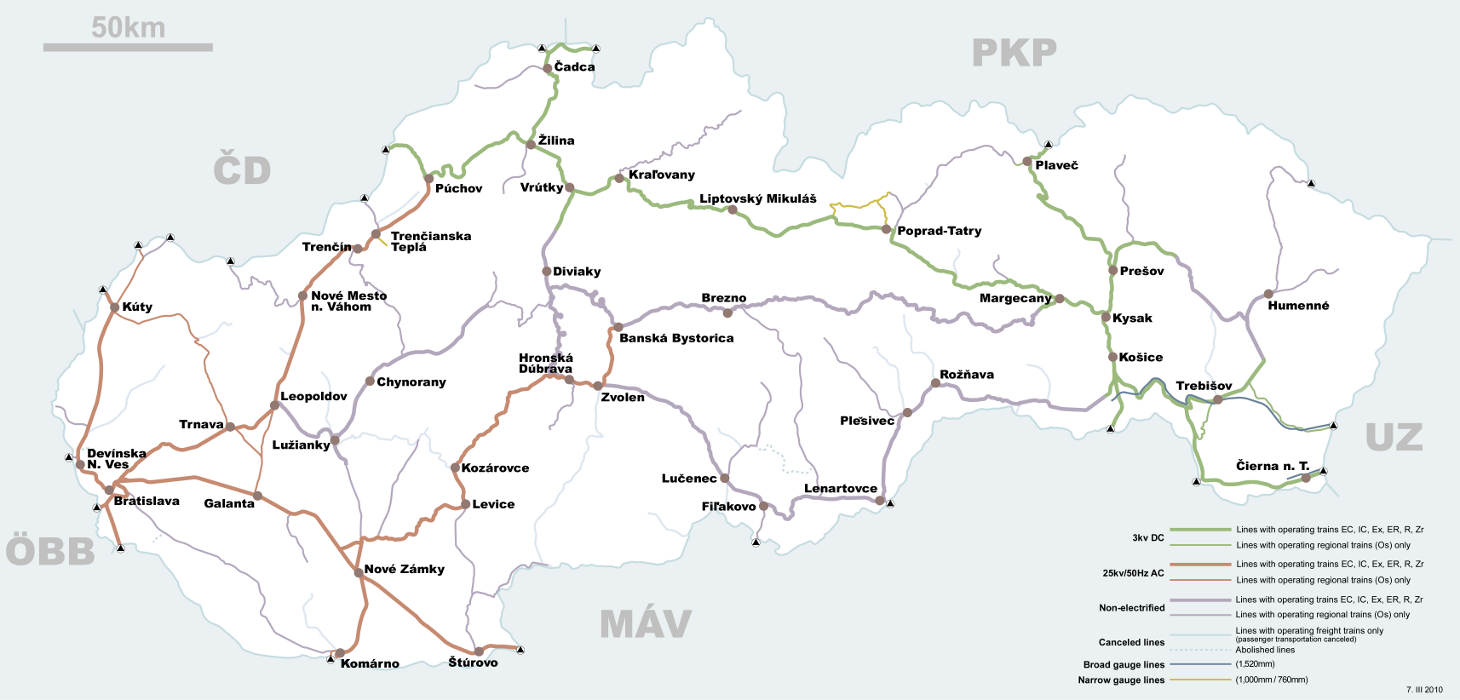

Rail transport in Slovakia began on September 21, 1840, with the opening of the first horse-powered line from Bratislava to Svätý Jur (at that time in the Kingdom of Hungary). The first steam-powered line, from Bratislava to Vienna, opened on August 20, 1848.

The modern Železnice Slovenskej republiky company was established in 1993 as a successor of the Československé státní dráhy in Slovakia. Until 1996 it had formal monopoly on railroad transportation in the country, which remained a de facto monopoly until the advent of private operators entering the network in the early 2010s. Private passenger service operators include RegioJet, which operates trains between Prague (Czech Republic) and Košice, Žilina and Košice, Žilina-Bratislava-Prague and on the Komárno - Dunajská Streda - Bratislava route. The Bratislava-Komárno route is now operated by Leo Express. The other private operator is Leo Express which operates trains on the Prague-Košice/Prešov route. There are plans to win more tenders in Slovakia.

Since 2002 a law divided the company: ŽSR was left with infrastructure maintenance and passenger and cargo transport was moved into company "Železničná spoločnosť, a. s." (ZSSK). In 2005 this new company was further split into "Železničná spoločnosť Slovensko, a. s." (ZSSK) providing Passenger transport services and "Železničná spoločnosť Cargo Slovakia, a. s." (ZSSK Cargo) providing cargo services. Freight transport is operated by ZSCS and around 30 private companies.

Slovakia is a member of the International Union of Railways (UIC). The UIC Country Code for Slovakia is 56.

== History ==
Railway has become an important prerequisite for economic and social development of the country. In 1837 the construction of the first European Railway Highway started. Its construction became a potential threat to market of agricultural goods and timber from western Slovakia. Therefore, a company was founded to build a horse railway that would link the five royal cities between Bratislava and Trnava. The service was providing until the first half of the 19th century. At beginning, the construction of the railway was in the hands of the state. Later, in year 1854, the state entrusted railway building to private entrepreneurs.

=== 1867–1873 ===
The intensity of construction changed after settlement in 1867. Ministry of Transport and Public Works was established. Its main objective was construction of transport communications independent of Austria. In Slovakia this meant extensive construction of railways.

In the period between 1867 and 1873 a number of major railways were built:

- Košice – Žilina – Bohumín
- Pešť – Fiľakovo – Lučenec – Zvolen – Vrútky
- Michaľany – Humenné – Medzilaborce – Lupkov – Przemysl
- Košice – Michaľany – Slovenské Nové Mesto – Čop
- Bratislava – Trenčín
- Prešov – Orlov – Tarnov
- Fiľakovo – Plešivec – Dobšiná, Jesenské – Tisovec

Hungary tried to use private capital for railway construction. The lack of funds threatened the construction of railways and Hungary started in 1868 to build railways on its own.

The railway construction was accompanied by a series of scandals and corruption affairs among aristocracy, politicians and businessmen. In spite of this fact, the basis of the railway network was set up in relatively short time.

=== 1873–1918 ===
Bankruptcy of the Vienna stock exchange was the beginning of an economic crisis affecting the economy of the monarchy throughout the first half of the 70th of the 19th century. Changing economic circumstances was reflected on the further construction of railways. During this period, the country was aware of the strategic importance of railway transportation for economy and policy.

The state responded to the situation with a number of actions: stopped the construction of expensive railways and created legal conditions for the construction of local railways.

=== 1918–1939 ===
After the formation of Czechoslovakia, the most important task was to maintain and run the rail network defined by the new boundaries. Two divisions, which were set up in the cities Košice and Bratislava, were responsible for the network managing. Slovakia inherited rail network that was insufficient for the new state requirements.

The only one efficient line was Košice-Bohumín. The state therefore decided to take over the operation of all private railways and extend the rail lines. The pressure of competition from the road freight transport stimulated further developments. The speed of freight trains was increased up to 70 km/h by applying continuous braking. Significant progress in passenger traffic was achieved by motorization of local railways.

=== 1939–1945 ===
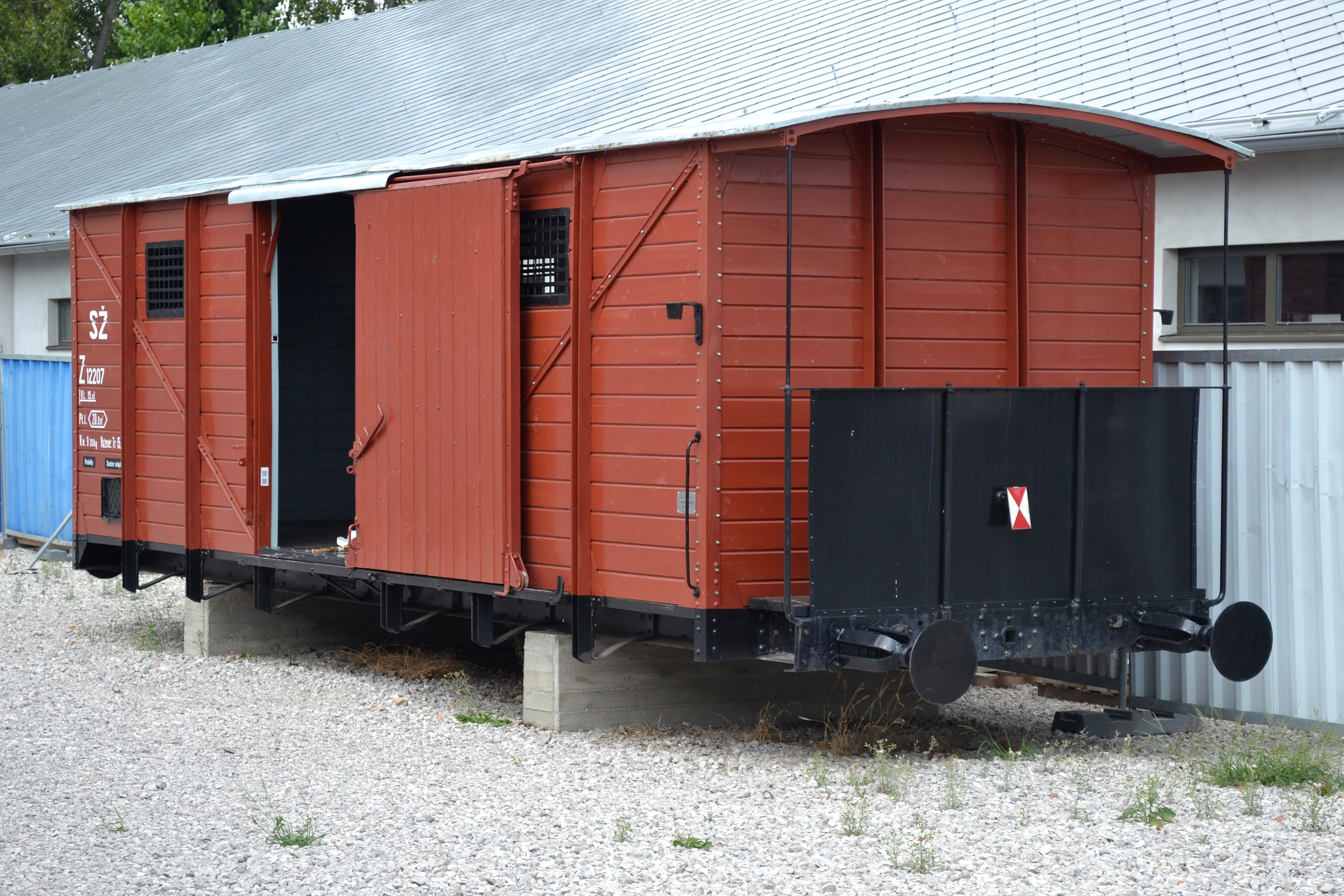
Restored train car used to transport Slovak Jews. SŽ stands for Slovenské Železnice (Slovak Railways).

On 3 March 1939 the Slovak State was established. However, it was dependent on Germany. The war caused high intensity of freight transport. The key role was played by export of raw materials, agricultural and food products. Passenger transport was characterized by extensive seasonal movements of agricultural and industrial workers from Poland, Slovakia, Ukraine and Russia travelling to Germany.

=== 1945–1992 ===
After World War II, with the reestablishment of Czechoslovakia, the main issue that needed to be resolved was the reconstruction of the rail network. After the 1948 regime change, a communist government came to power. All private railways were nationalized. The insufficient capacity of the Čierna nad Tisou – Košice – Žilina – Bohumín line was the main factor that sped up the expansion of the rail network in southern Slovakia. At the same time, the electrification of railways was carried out.

The constitution of 1960 defined Czechoslovakia as a socialist state. Rail transport was a major pillar of Joseph Stalin's "iron and steel" doctrine. There was strong emphasis on the transport of raw materials, building materials, fuels and food.

Industrialization had a significant impact on the growth of passenger transport — people traveled to work and school over large distances. The growth in intensity caused imbalances between demand and technical capabilities. The situation stabilized during the 1970s due to the development of individual car transport and the intensity of rail transport started to decline.

=== After 1993 ===
On January 1, 1993, the Slovak Republic became an independent country. At the same time, the company Železnice Slovenskej Republiky was established. The bad initial situation required steps to be taken to consolidate the operation of the railway network as quick as possible. The most important measure was to create conditions for the privatization and optimization of rail activity to meet business requirements. The strategic objective was to provide access to the European Union trade market and to capitalize on the geographic location of the territory of the Slovak Republic and its tourist potential.

A line, Lanžhot (Czech Republic) to Kúty (Slovakia) will be completed in late 2023.

Between 2021 and 2023 the line from Košice to Moldava and Bodvou is undergoing electrification. Between 2023 and 2026 the line from Košice to Bánovce nad Ondavou is undergoing electrification. Both with 3 kV DC, with provisions for future conversion to 25 kV 50 Hz.

== Intermodal Traffic from China ==
In 2017 a trial container service from Dalian in China to the SPaP port on the River Danube in Bratislava arrived in the Slovak capital on November 13, after a 17-day journey via Russia and Ukraine. The 41 containers carrying goods worth more than US$3m including electronics and machine parts were transhipped between gauges at the Manzhouli/Zabaykalsk crossing between China and Russia and at Dobrá on the Ukraine/Slovakia border, where the freight facility has two gantry cranes and a transhipment capacity of up to 200 000 containers per year.

== Companies ==
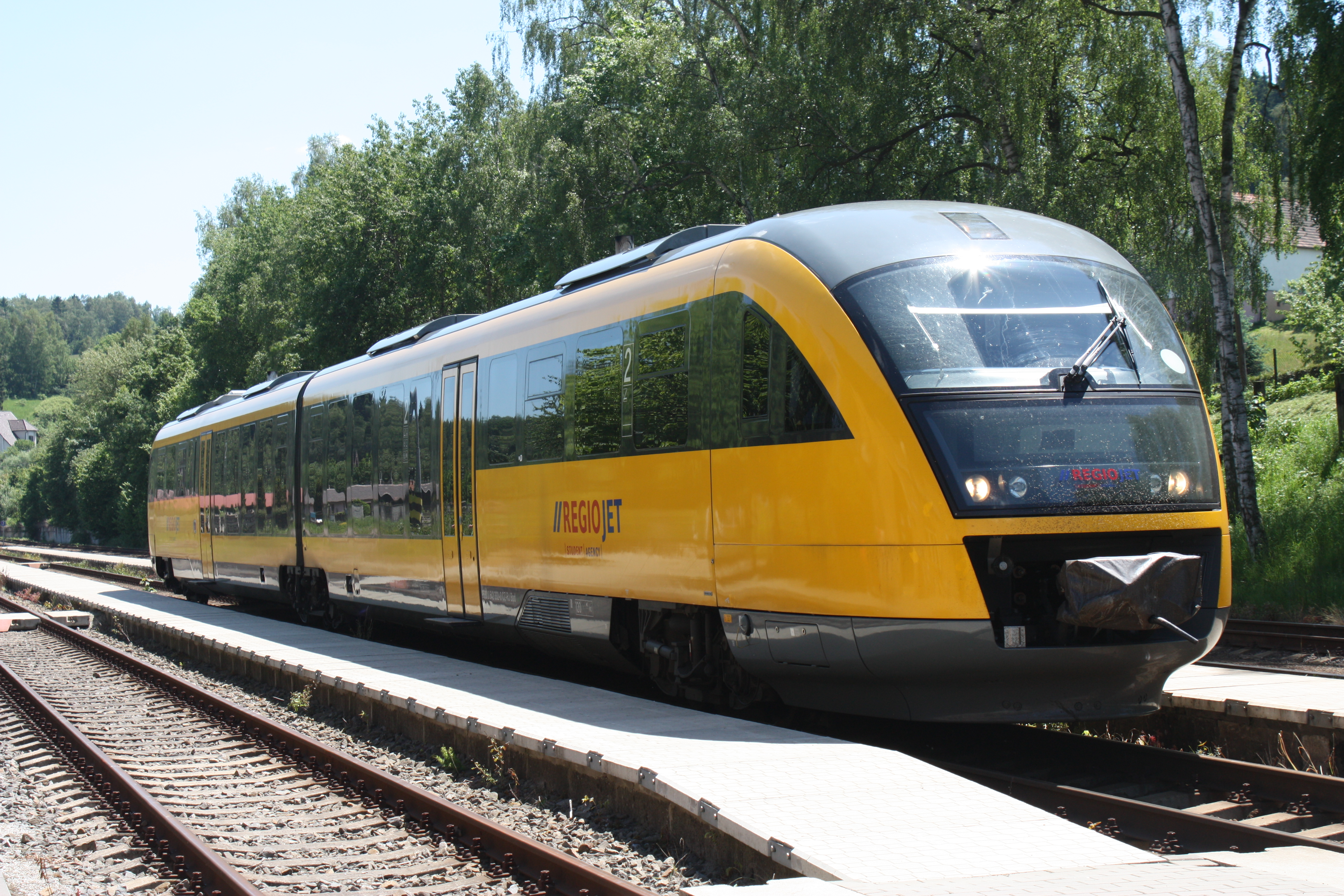
A train of RegioJet

- Železnice Slovenskej republiky (ŽSR) - state-owned railway infrastructure operator in Slovakia
- RegioJet - private passenger railway operator
- LEO Express - private passenger railway operator
- Arriva - private passenger railway operator
- Čierny Hron Railway (ČHŽ) - 760 mm (2 ft 5 15/16 in) narrow gauge heritage railway owned by villages on the ČHŽ lines
- The Historical Logging Switchback Railway in Vychylovka (HLÚŽ or OKLŽ) - a 760 mm (2 ft 5 15/16 in) narrow gauge heritage railway owned by the Museum of Kysuce
- Nitra Agricultural Museum Railway (NPŽ) - 760 mm (2 ft 5 15/16 in) narrow gauge railway
- Železničná spoločnosť Slovensko a. s. (ZSSK) - state-owned passenger train Operator
- Železničná spoločnosť Cargo Slovakia a. s.(ZSSK Cargo or ZSCS) - state-owned freight train Operator

== Statistics ==
Data taken from Year bulletin of ŽSR 2006 (in Slovak)

- Total length of lines: 3,658 km (2,273 mi)
  - Single track: 2,639 km (1,640 mi)
  - Double or more track: 1,019 km (633 mi)
- 1,520 mm (4 ft 11 27/32 in) broad gauge: 99 km (62 mi)
- 1,435 mm (4 ft 8 1/2 in) standard gauge: 3,509 km (2,180 mi)
- Narrow gauge: 50 km (31 mi)
  - 45 km (28 mi) of 1,000 mm (3 ft 3 3/8 in) gauge; 5 km (3.1 mi) of 750 mm (2 ft 5 1/2 in) gauge)
- Electrified: 1,577 km (980 mi)

As of December 31, 2010

- 75 tunnels measuring 43.228 kilometers
- 2321 railway bridges measuring 52.154 kilometers
- 8529 railroad switches

== Rail links to adjacent countries ==
- Same gauge 1,435 mm (4 ft 8 1/2 in)
  - Austria — one crossing with voltage change 25 kV AC/15 kV AC and one unelectrified with a plan to electrify and unite the voltage by 2025!
  - Czech Republic — same voltage 3 kV DC or 25 kV AC - 2 crossings electrified with AC in the south, two crossings with DC in the north, two unelectrified in the central part of the border
  - Hungary — same voltage 25 kV AC (at Rusovce-Rajka, Komárno-Komárom and Štúrovo-Szob crossings) or voltage change 3 kV DC/25 kV AC (at Kechnec-Hidasnémeti and Slovenské Nové Mesto-Sátoraljaújhely crossing)
  - Poland — same voltage 3 kV DC
- Break-of-gauge 1,435 mm (4 ft 8 1/2 in)/1,520 mm (4 ft 11 27/32 in)
  - Ukraine — voltage 3 kV DC

== See also ==
- History of rail transport in Slovakia
- List of railway lines in Slovakia
- Metro Bratislava
- Slovak rail border crossings
- Slovenská strela
- Track gauge in Slovakia
- Transport in Slovakia
- Uzhhorod–Košice broad-gauge track
