= Slovenská strela =

Czech passenger train

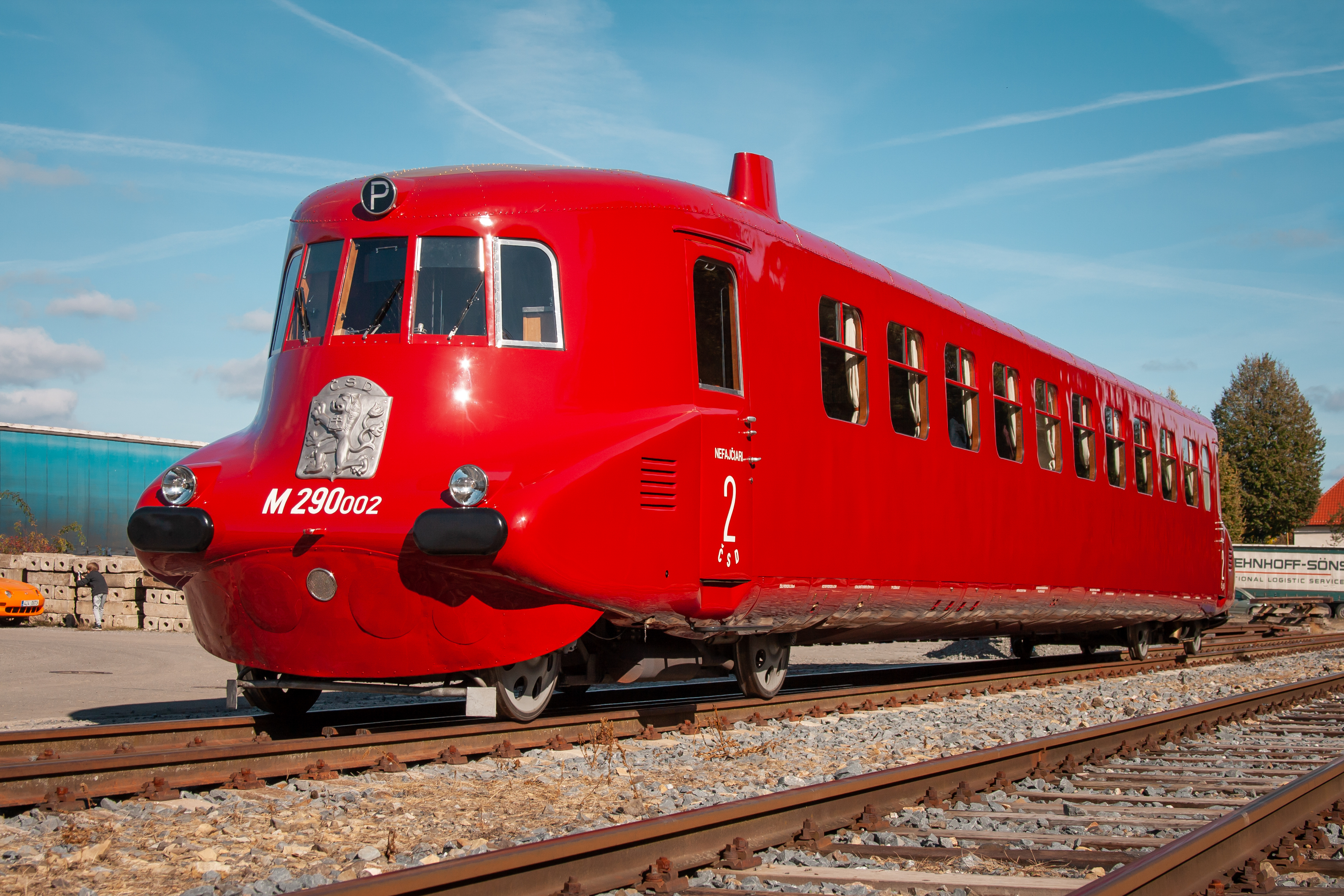
M 290.002 in 2021 after extensive repairs

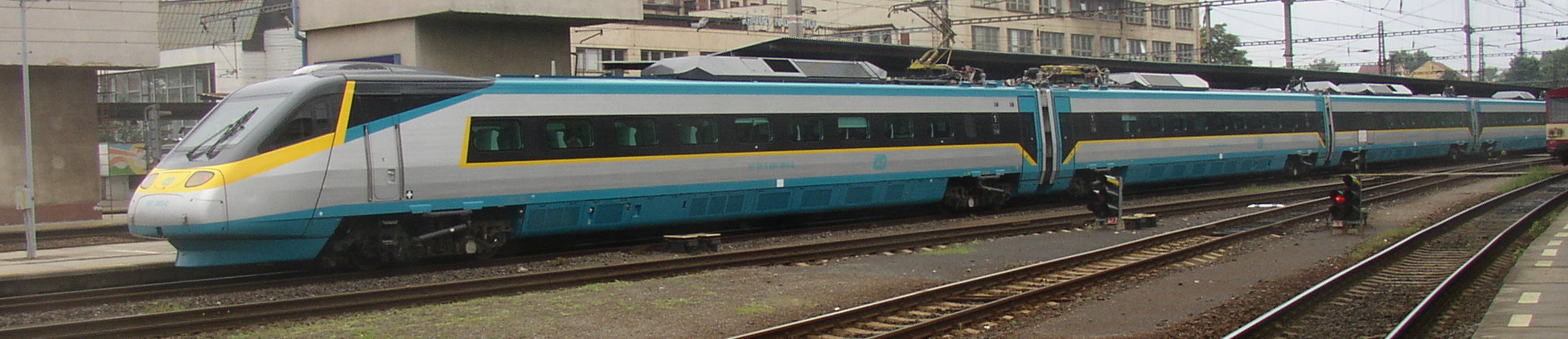
A Czech 680 Pendolino in Kralupy nad Vltavou on Test Ride.

Slovenská strela (Slovak for "Slovak Arrow") is the name of an express train, first operated by ČSD in Czechoslovakia on the line between Bratislava and Prague, beginning in 1936 and still operating, but as a higher speed train service since 2012, at about 200 km/h (124 mph). Track will soon be upgraded to allow the highest speed that the rolling stock can do, per the 2017 plan.

== History ==
Introduced in 1936, Slovenská strela served as a ČSD flagship between the metropolises of Slovakia and Bohemia. It originally completed the route in 4 hours and 51 minutes. It originally ran with unique motor units also named Slovenská strela, later with various motor, steam and electric locomotives.

The train has been in service ever since, except for the wartime years 1939–1945. However, in 1965–1967, the train was renamed to Ostrava-Bratislava express.

From December 2006 to 12 December 2009, as well as in 2011, the high-speed Pendolino ETR 470, manufactured in Italy and owned by Czech Railways as ČD Class 680 was introduced to this express.

In the 2010-timetable and from 2012 onwards, the train was operating on the route Bratislava - Břeclav as EC 277/278 with through coaches from Bratislava to Prague and Ostseebad Binz, and from Prague detaching from EC 177 to Vienna.

In the 2013 timetable, a through train between Bratislava and Stralsund via Prague and Berlin was named Slovenská strela.

== See also ==
- Rail transport in Slovakia
- Rail transport in the Czech Republic
- ČSD Class M 290.0
- High-speed rail in the Czech Republic
