= ČSD Class M 290.0 =

Locomotive

ČSD class M 290.0
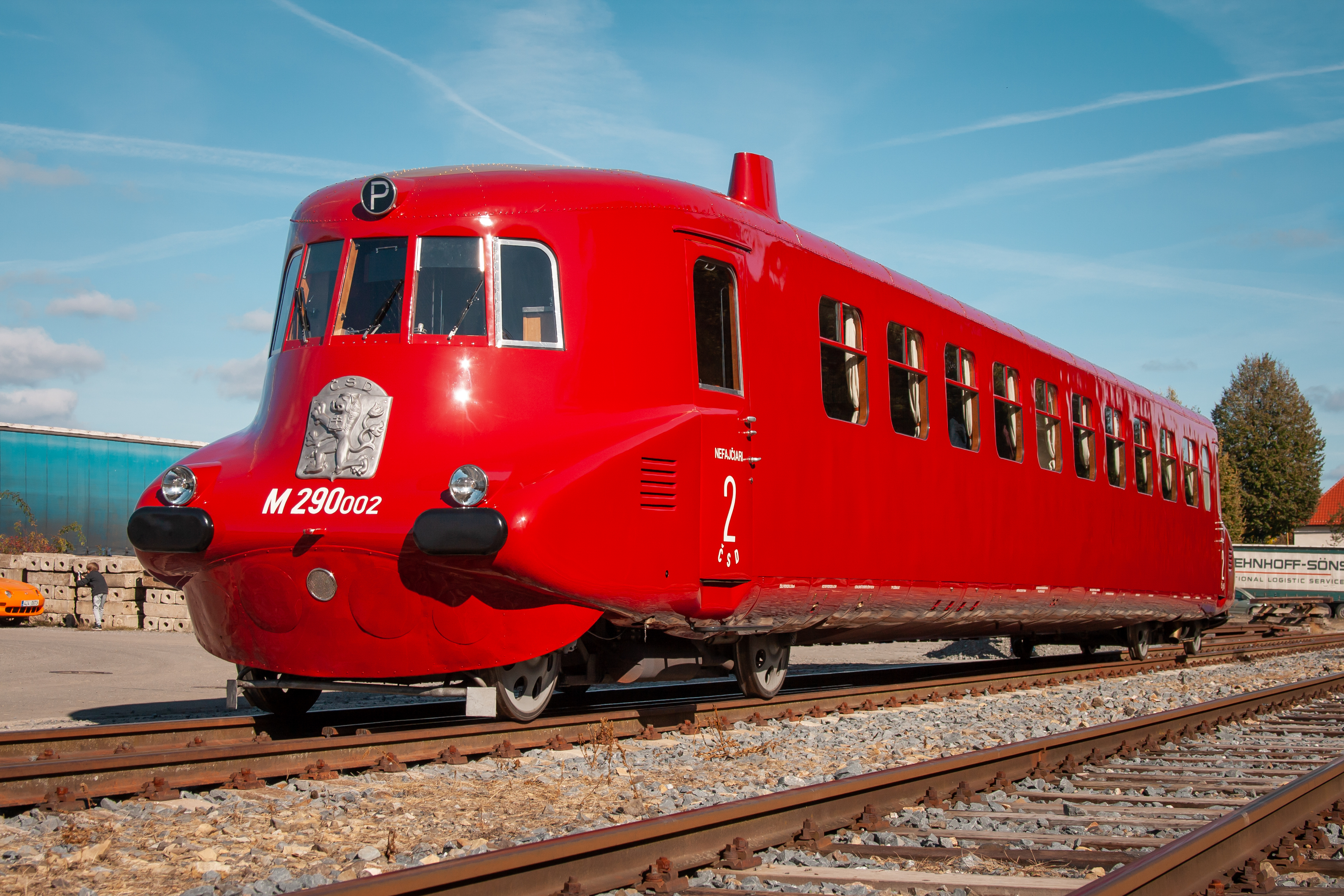
- M 290.002 at the Valšské Klobouky railway station on October 16, 2021
Type and origin
- Builder: Tatra Kopřivnice
- Build date: 1936
- Total produced: 2
Specifications
- Configuration
  - UIC: (1A)′ (A1)′
- Gauge: 1,435 mm (4 ft 8 1/2 in)
Career
- Operators: ČSD
- Official name: Tatra 68
- Nicknames: Slovenská strela

Railcar class M 290.0 (manufactured as Tatra 68), named after an express train which it served as Slovenská strela was manufactured by Tatra Kopřivnice in 1936 for Czechoslovak State Railways.

Only two units were manufactured and were used on newly introduced express train Slovenská strela starting in 1936.They covered the distance in 4 hours and 28 minutes with a maximum speed of 130 kilometres per hour (81 mph). Both were taken out of service when World War II started in 1939. Afterwards, they were only occasionally deployed on local routes.

The M 290.001 was taken out of service in 1953, the M290.002 in 1960. The M 290.002 is now on display in the company museum of Tatra in Kopřivnice. The M 290.001 did not survive. As of August 2018, the car no. 290,002 is being restored at a cost of 35 million crowns (CZK). Upon completion it will once again be capable of full operation.

== Gallery ==
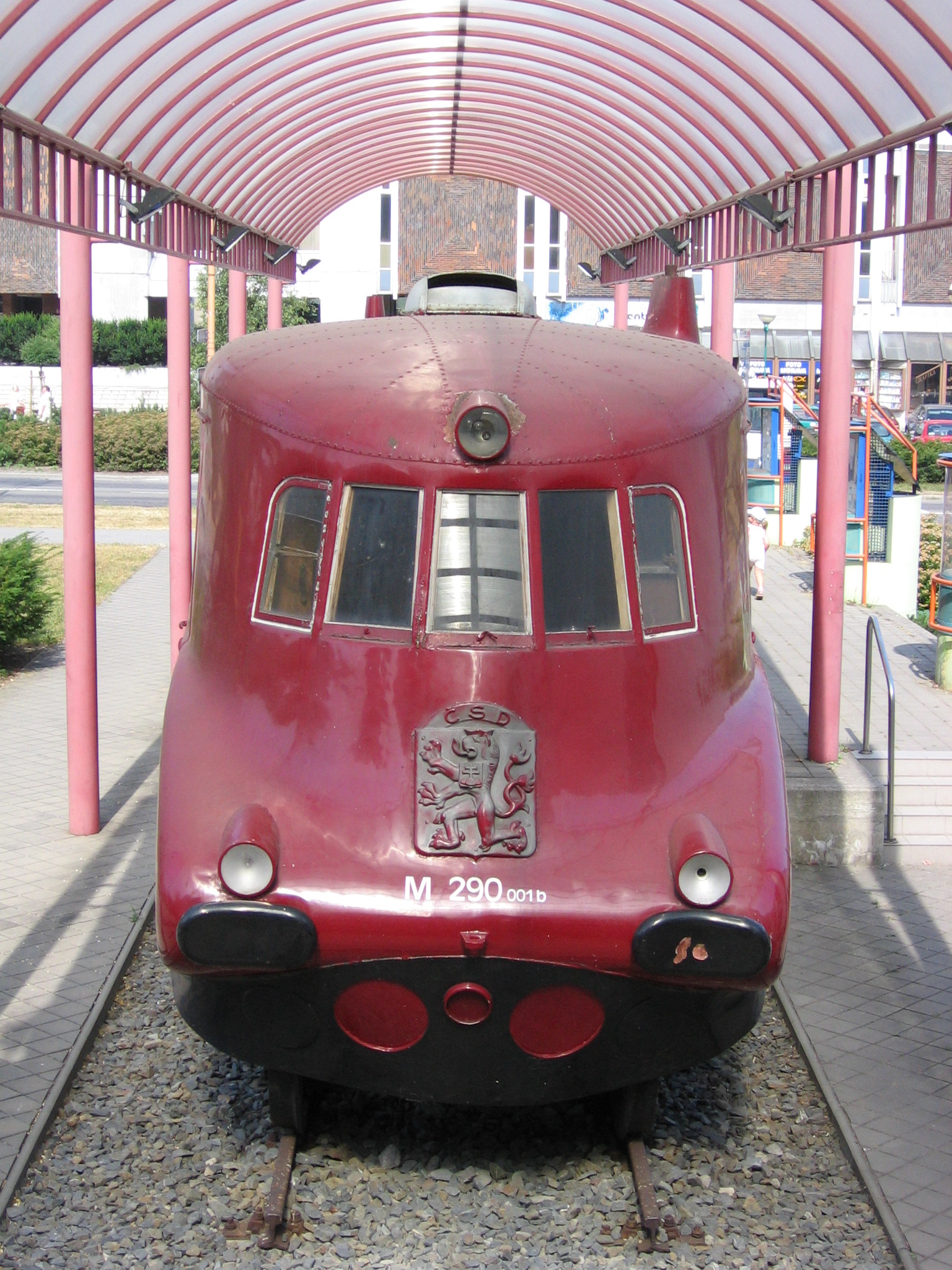
Front view of M 290.002

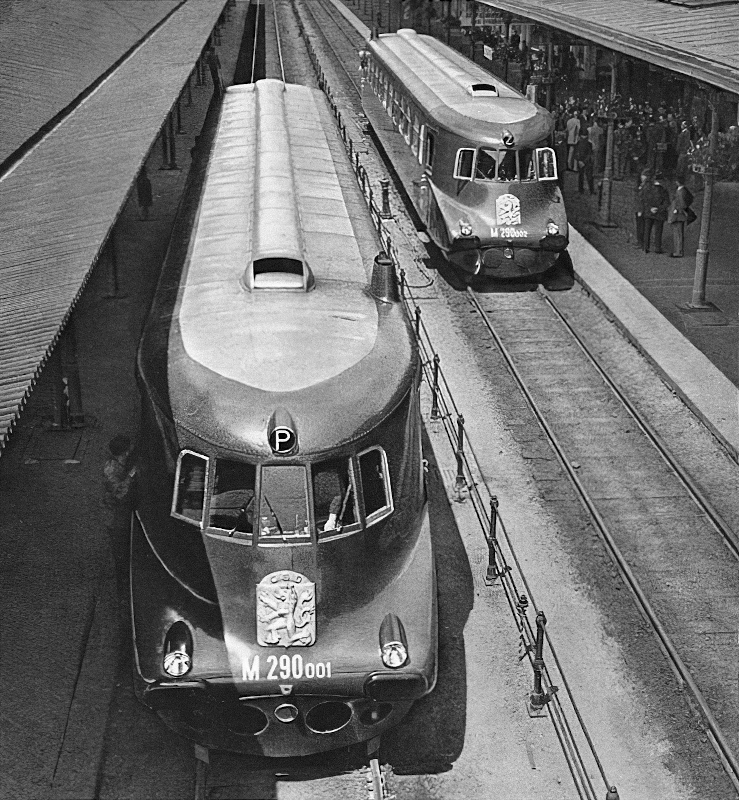
Railcars M 290.001 and M 290.002 in train station Přerov during a demonstration ride

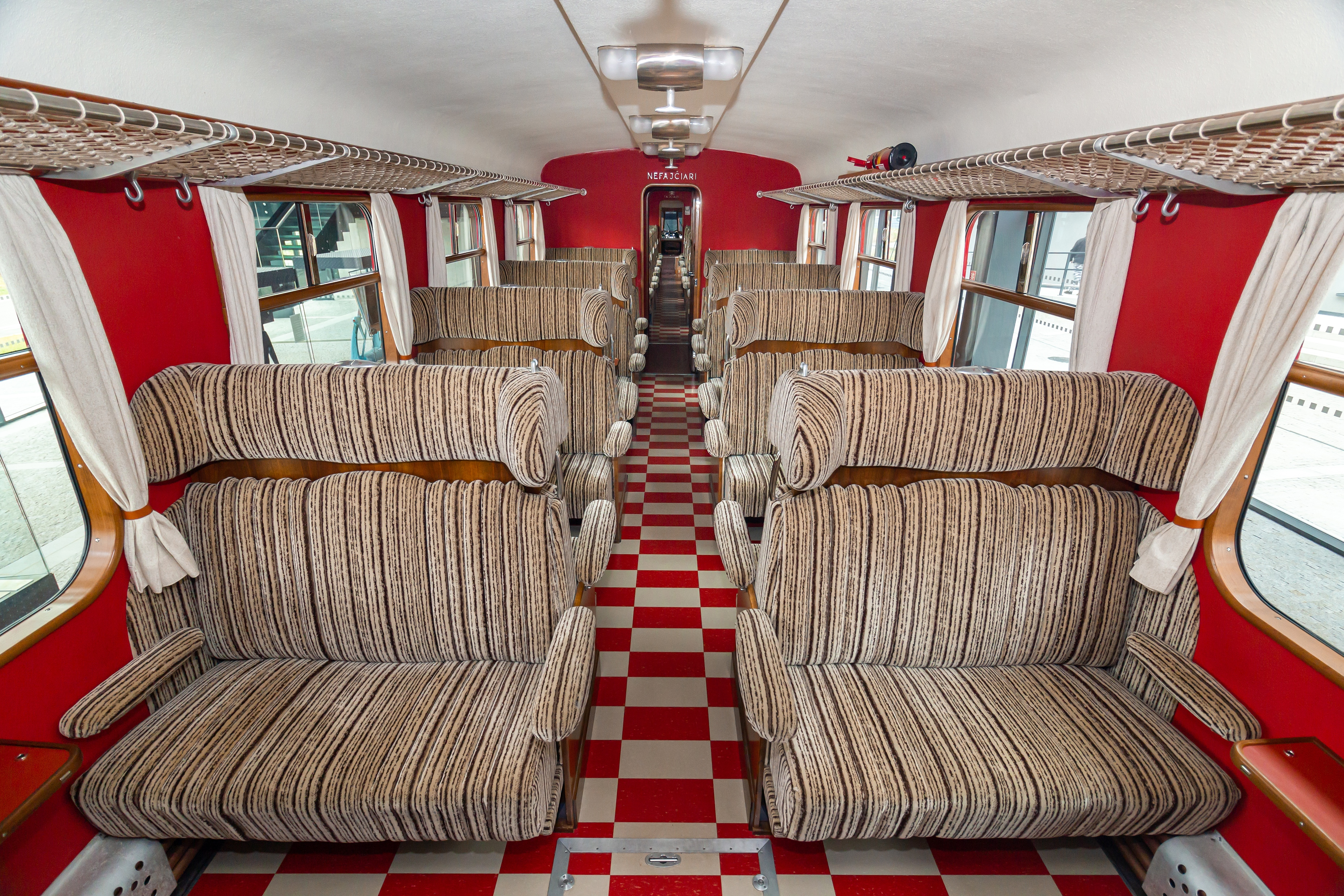
Interior of M 290.002

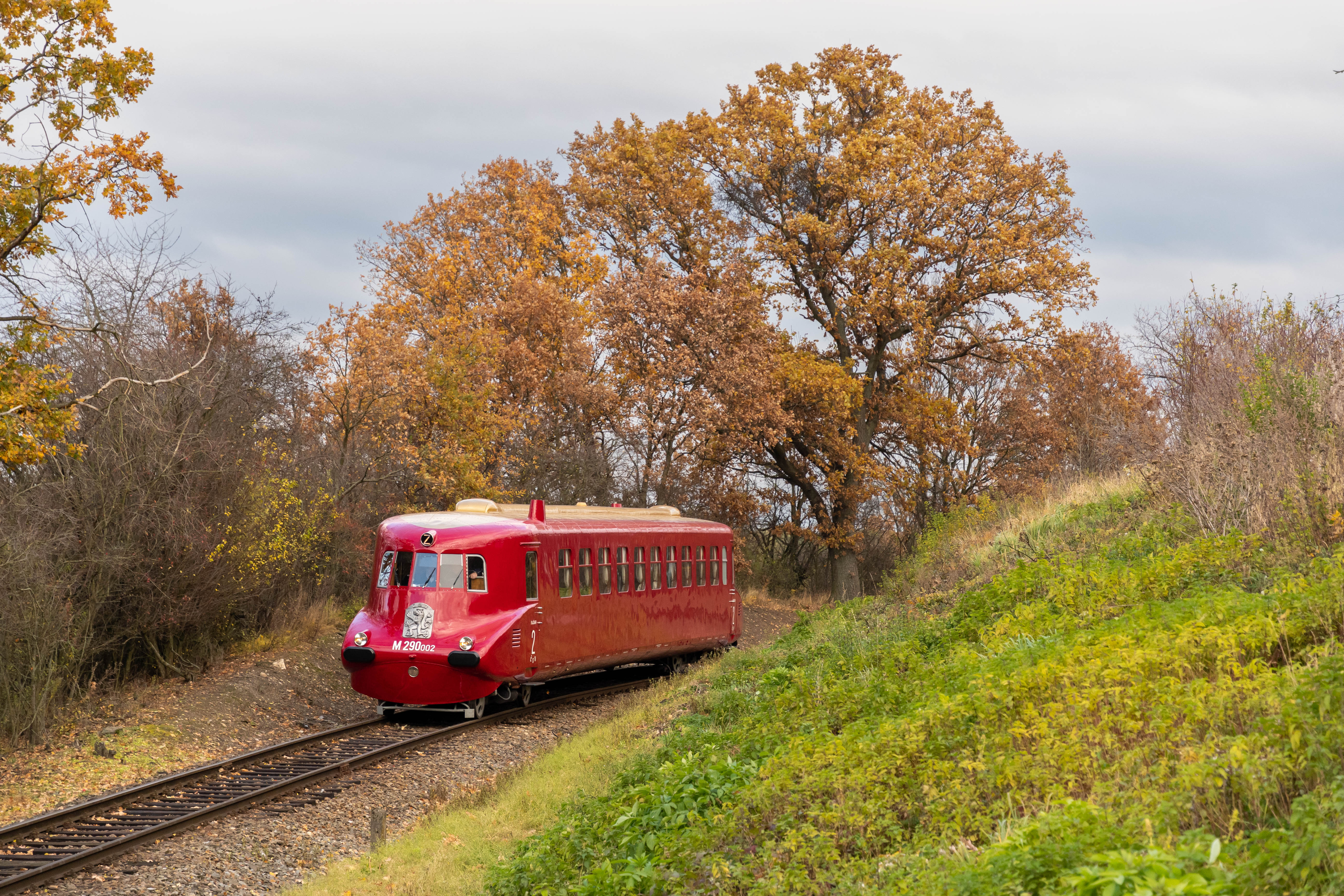
Railcar M 290.002 near train station Žleby during a special ride

== See also ==
- Slovenská strela
