= Železničná spoločnosť Cargo Slovakia =

Freight railway company in Slovakia

Železničná spoločnosť Cargo Slovakia, a. s.
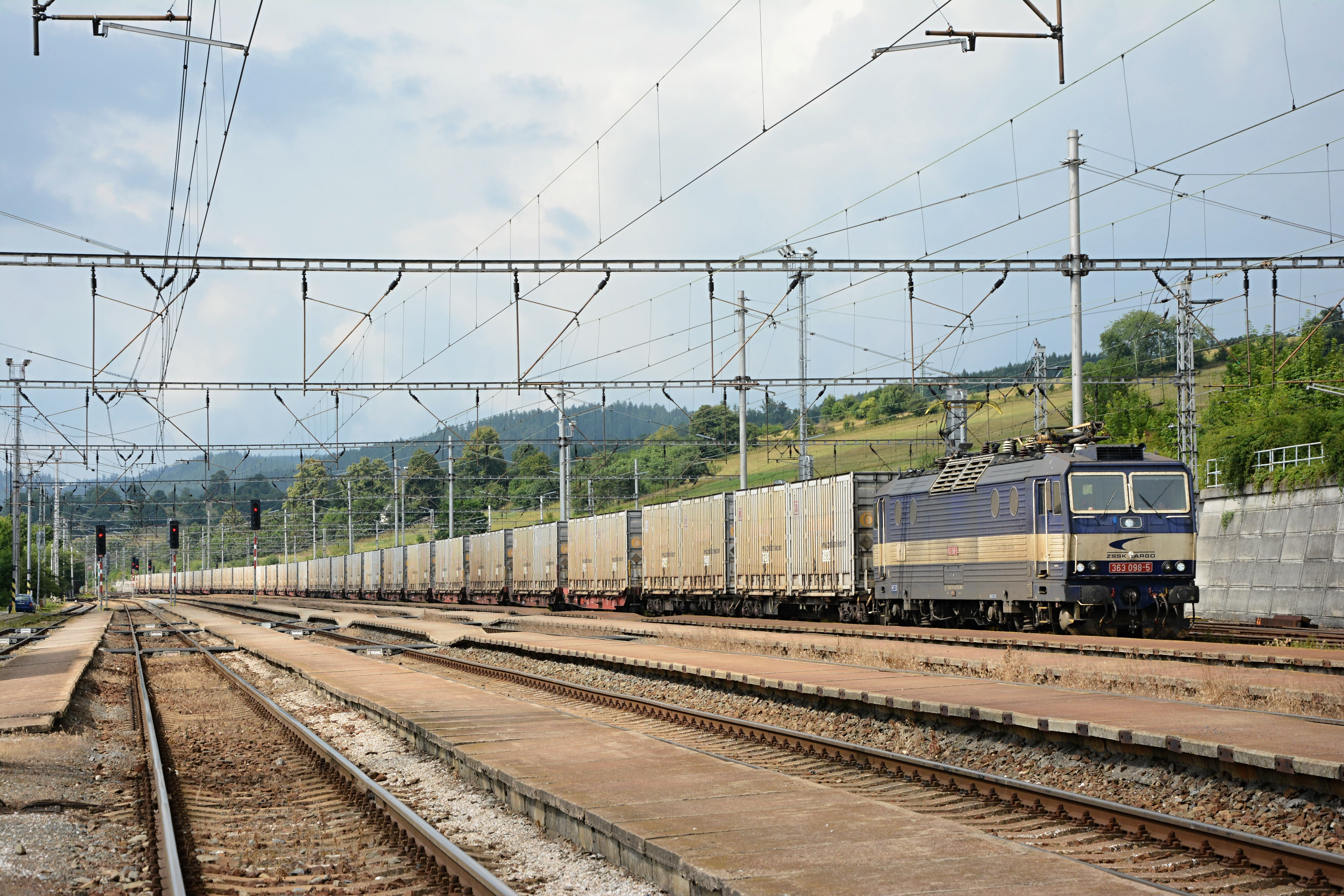
- ZSSK CARGO electric locomotive class 363 hauling a freight train in Horní Lideč, Czech Republic
- Type: Public
- Industry: Rail freight transport
- Predecessor: Železničná spoločnosť
- Founded: 1 January 2005; 21 years ago
- Founder: Slovak Republic
- Headquarters: Tomášikova 28B, Bratislava, Slovakia
- Owner: Slovak Republic (100%)
- Website: zscargo.sk

Železničná spoločnosť Cargo Slovakia, a. s. (ZSSK CARGO, VKM: ZSSKC) is the Slovak state-owned freight train operator based in Bratislava. It was established on 1 January 2005 by separating Železničná spoločnosť into two different companies – one intended to operate passenger trains (ZSSK) and the other one freight trains. Its establisher and the only shareholder is the Republic of Slovakia, which acts via the Ministry of Transport and Construction.

ZSSK CARGO's market share in Slovakia is about 60%, and in comparison to the other freight train operators, ZSSK CARGO has the best coverage of the Slovak territory.

== Activity ==
ZSSK CARGO's main business activity is providing rail freight transport services. The company also repairs and maintains rail traction vehicles and freight carriages and performs rail vehicle safety inspections, examinations, tests and measurements. Other services include renting of traction vehicles and freight carriages, road transport or ensuring of contract conclusion related to UIC or EUR trademark usage to repair or produce pallets.

== Product portfolio ==
- freight transport: transport of single carriages, group of carriages and unit trains, certified logistics trains, intermodal transport, transport of automobiles and waste
- siding services
- transshipment services
- auxiliary services: transport of special consignments, safety advisor services, procurement services related to transport (e.g. operations of customs procedures, sealing of carriages, posting of consignment instead of the consignor etc.)
- maintenance and repairs of railway vehicles: maintenance and repairs of traction vehicles and freight carriages, changes in construction and design, inspections, examinations, testing and measurements of railway vehicles, mobile services (performing repairs directly during operation) etc.

== Certificates ==
The company is a holder of certificates in compliance with the standards:

- STN EN ISO 9001:2016 on the products:
  - Rail freight transport and transportations.
  - Rolling stock maintenance and repairs, storage and distribution of goods.
  - Ensuring professional qualification and education of employees.
- STN ISO 45001:2019 on the product:
  - Managerial system of work safety and health protection at work in ZSSK CARGO.

== Transport ==
ZSSK CARGO transports about 23-25 million tons of goods per year. Before the COVID-19 pandemic the amount reached the point of 35 million tons per year. The largest proportion of transported goods holds iron ore (about 35%), the other most transported goods include metals, coal, building materials, petroleum products, wood and chemicals.

== See also ==
- Transport in Slovakia
- Rail transport in Slovakia
- Železnice Slovenskej republiky
- Železničná spoločnosť Slovensko
