= ČD Class 680 =

Czech electric trains

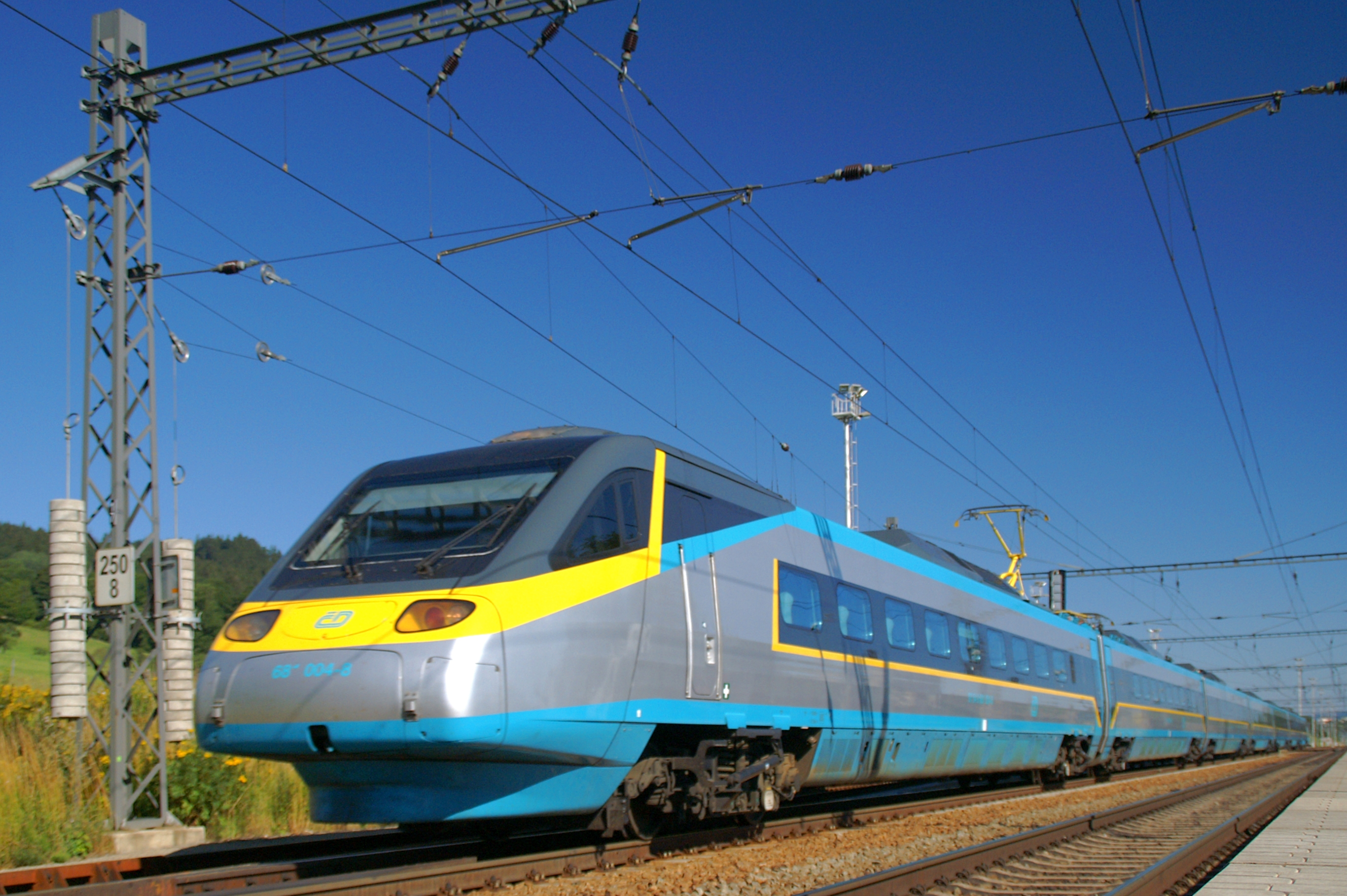

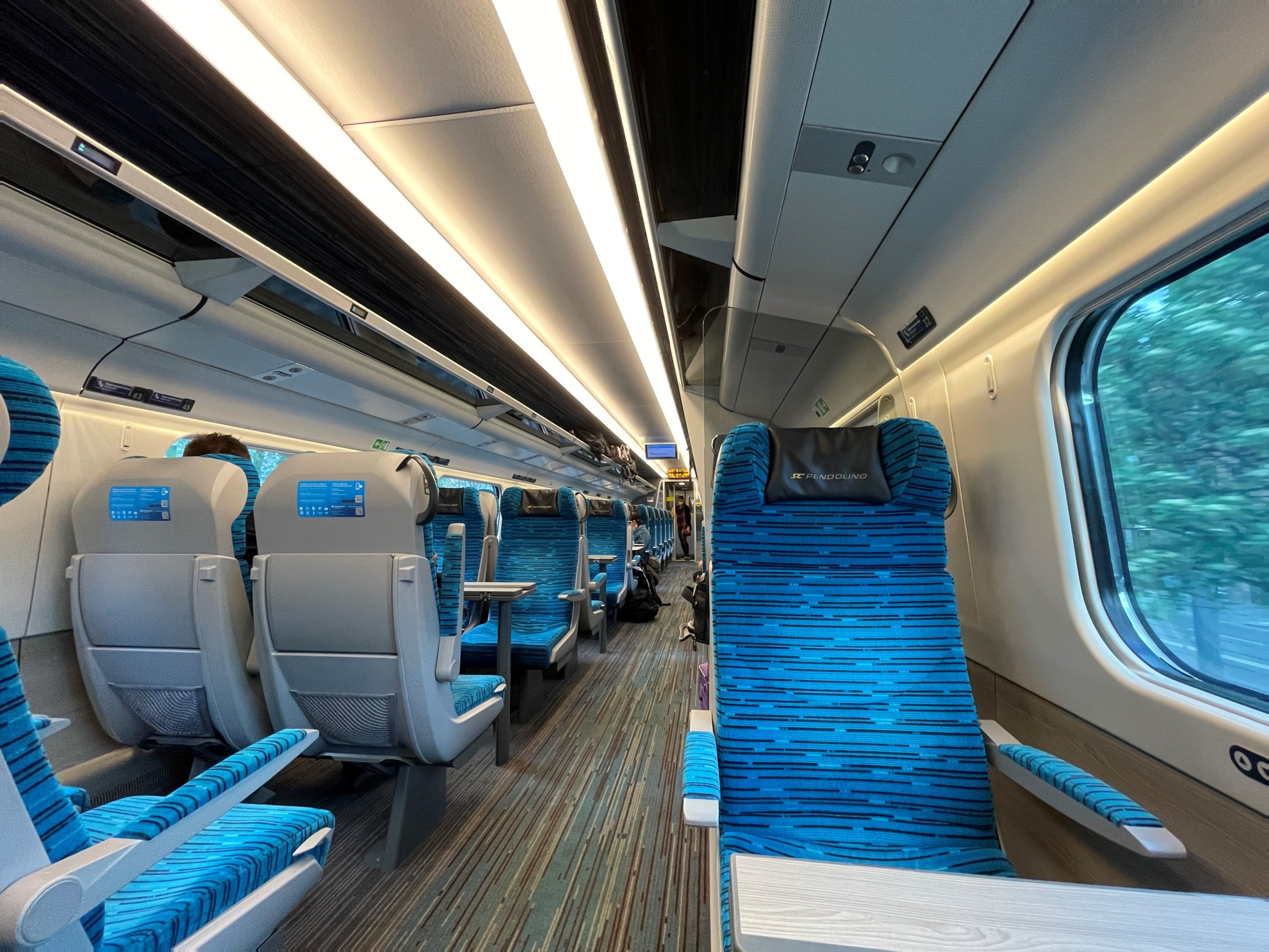
- Refurbished Second Class carriage
- Manufacturer: Alstom (formerly Fiat Ferroviaria)
- Family name: Pendolino
- Constructed: 2004
- Entered service: 2006
- Number built: Seven 7-car sets
- Formation: see text
- Operators: České dráhy

Specifications
- Train length: 185.3 m (607 ft 11 1/4 in)
- Doors: 2 Pairs per-side
- Maximum speed: Service: 200 km/h (125 mph); Design: 230 km/h (143 mph); Record: 237 km/h (147 mph)
- Weight: 384.0 t (377.9 long tons; 423.3 short tons)
- Traction system: Phase-fired thyristor control
- Traction motors: 8 × 490 kW (660 hp)
- Power output: 3,920 kW (5,260 hp)
- Electric system(s): 25 kV 50 Hz AC, 15 kV 16.7 Hz AC and 3 kV DC, all from overhead catenary
- Current collection: Pantograph
- Track gauge: 1,435 mm (4 ft 8 1/2 in) standard gauge

ČD Class 680 are high-speed EMUs operating in the Czech Republic, using tilting Pendolino technology intended for the SuperCity train service. Built by Alstom (originally Fiat Ferroviaria), they were largely based on the nine-car ETR 470. While testing from Břeclav to Brno on November 18, 2004, the Pendolino reached a speed of 237 km/h (147 mph) and created a new Czech railway speed record. The units are able to operate on 25 kV 50 Hz AC, 15 kV 16.7 Hz AC and 3,000 V DC.

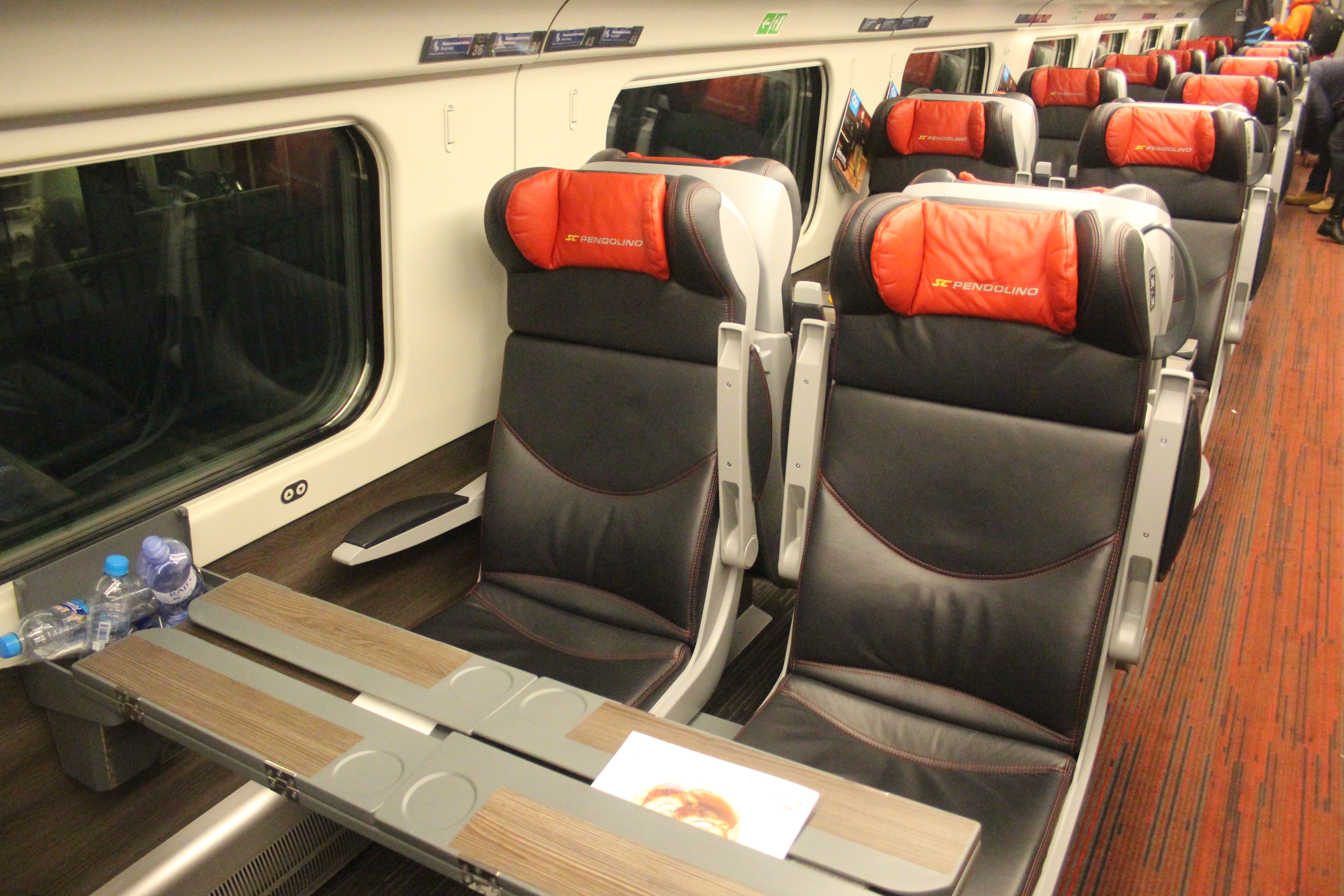
Refurbished interior in First Class

== History ==
The initial Czech order for tilting trains was placed with Fiat Ferroviaria during 2000. As part of the Alstom take over of Fiat Ferroviaria the order was changed to Pendolino trains. The first set was delivered in 2004 as Pendolino ČD 680.

During the testing period, the train had problems with the Czech signaling system. The problems were reported to have been solved and the trains entered regular service in December 2005 between Prague and Ostrava. As of late January 2006, all five of the in-service trains suffered from software and operating problems, ranging from failing air conditioning and heating to malfunctions of the tilt controls. The supposedly ERTMS-compliant ATLAS control system is unable to properly connect several discrete systems, each based on different software platforms. Similar problems have also been reported with the Finnish VR Class Sm3. All problems were fixed.

== Formation ==
The seven car units are composed as:

Class Nº	Type	Class
681	Driving Motor	2nd
081	Trailer	1st
683	Motor	Buffet 2nd
084	Trailer	2nd
684	Motor	2nd
082	Trailer	2nd
682	Driving Motor	2nd

Cars are individually numbered, with the driving motors carrying their numbers on the nose.

== Operations ==
Pendolino is used primarily for the SuperCity train service, which is the fastest train service of ČD.

In December 2006 Czech Pendolinos were given permission to operate in Slovakia and Austria.

In 2009 and 2011, one pair of ČD 680s operated as SuperCity Slovenská strela between Prague and Bratislava. However, it was cancelled due to a low demand, since the train was not actually faster, but more expensive.

As of 2020 ČD Pendolinos operated nine trips a day in each direction on the SuperCity train service under the name SuperCity Pendolino which is running the Prague-Pardubice-Olomouc-Ostrava route, with some continuing to Bohumín and one continuing to the Slovak city of Košice under the name SuperCity Pendolino Košičan. Twice a day the service is as extended as an InterCity train from Prague to Františkovy Lázně via Plzeň.

== Accidents ==
- On December 1, 2007 a Pendolino derailed in Prague. No one was injured but the train was severely damaged.
- On July 22, 2015 train SC 512 en route from Bohumín to Františkovy Lázně collided with a truck carrying sheet metal at a railway crossing in Studénka. Three passengers died and 17 people were injured. The unit 680 003 was badly damaged, the body of the driving car 682 had to be made new. The damage was over 200 million CZK, the unit returned to service in September 2018.
- On June 27, 2022 a Pendolino en route from Bohumín to Prague head-on collided with ČD Class 742 locomotive near Bohumín train station. According to police, Pendolino driver was drunk and drove through Stop signal. Pendolino driver died and 5 people were injured. It was initially intended that the damaged unit 680 006 would not be repaired and would be used for spare parts. Later it was decided that the two most damaged cars would be scrapped and the remaining ones would be repaired and fitted with ETCS and used as spare cars during repairs of other units.
- On March 1, 2023 a Pendolino en route from Prague to Košice derailed in Žilina. The train derailed because of railroad switch failure. No one was injured.

== In popular culture ==
- A ČD Class 680 trainset was featured in the 2006 James Bond film Casino Royale. While in reality, the Pendolino does not actually operate the route, in the movie it was shown traveling from Switzerland to Montenegro.
- In the 2008 movie Wanted, the train was featured with real Czech Railways logo and equipment.

== See also ==
- List of ČD Classes
- List of high speed trains
