= Horní Lideč =

- Municipality
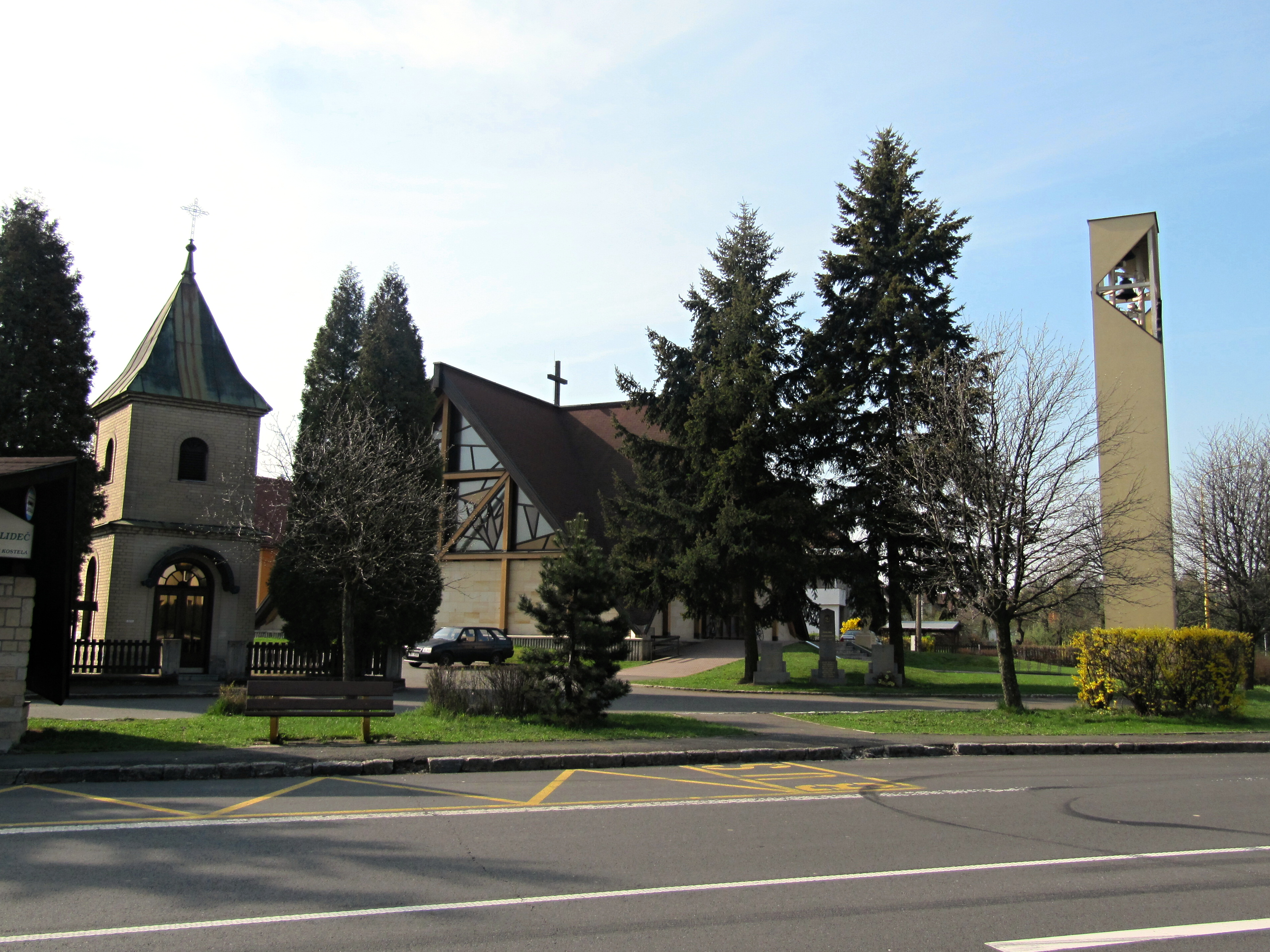
- Centre of Horní Lideč

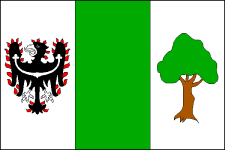
- Flag Coat of arms

- Location in the Czech Republic
- Coordinates: 49°10′52″N 18°3′40″E
- Country: Czech Republic
- Region: Zlín
- District: Vsetín
- First mentioned: 1518

Area
  - Total: 7.22 km^{2} (2.79 sq mi)
- Elevation: 465 m (1,526 ft)

Population (2026-01-01)
  - Total: 1,317
  - Density: 182/km^{2} (472/sq mi)
- Time zone: UTC+1 (CET)
  - Summer (DST): UTC+2 (CEST)
- Postal code: 756 12
- Website: www.hornilidec.cz

Horní Lideč (German: Ober Litsch) is a municipality and village in Vsetín District in the Zlín Region of the Czech Republic. It has about 1,300 inhabitants.

== Demographics ==
Historical population
Year	Pop.	±%
1869	532	—
1880	659	+23.9%
1890	476	−27.8%
1900	515	+8.2%
1910	519	+0.8%
1921	538	+3.7%
1930	559	+3.9%
1950	780	+39.5%
1961	911	+16.8%
1970	985	+8.1%
1980	1,161	+17.9%
1991	1,279	+10.2%
2001	1,397	+9.2%
2011	1,422	+1.8%
2021	1,291	−9.2%
Source: Censuses

== Twin towns – sister cities ==
Horní Lideč is twinned with:

- Dohňany, Slovakia
