= Metro Bratislava =

Proposed transit system in Bratislava

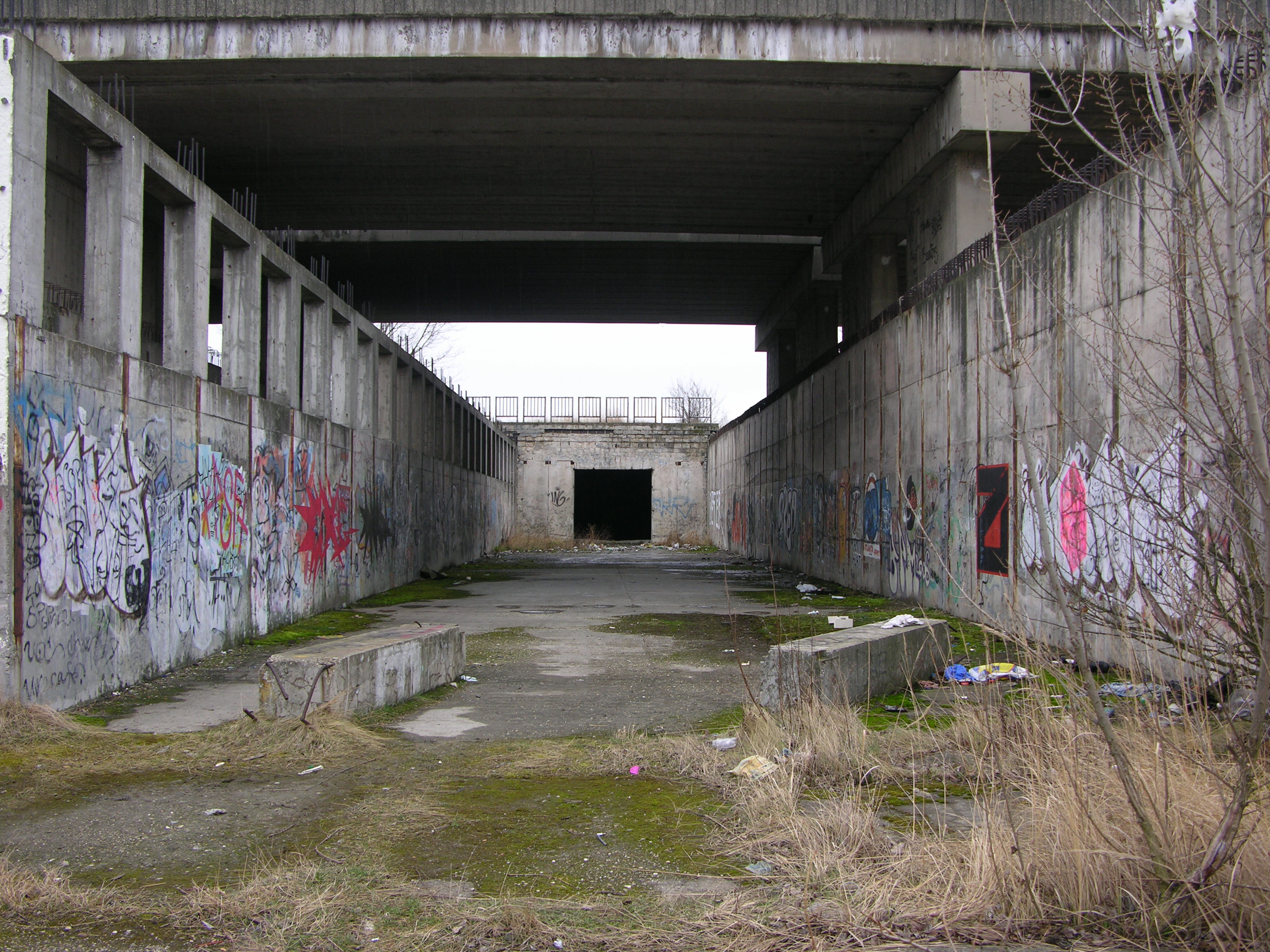

The Bratislava Metro (Slovak: Bratislavské metro) was intended to be built in Bratislava, Slovakia (then Czechoslovakia). In 1989, shortly after construction works began, the project came to a halt and has not been pursued since.

According to the metro plans, two lines were proposed. The "blue line" (Line A) was going to reach from Devínska Nová Ves in the North West of Bratislava through the Volkswagen Bratislava Plant and the city center to the station Rača in the North East. The "red line" (Line B) was supposed to start in Petržalka in the South, proceed through the city center where both lines would meet and eventually lead to the airport Letisko Milana Rastislava Štefánika in the East of Bratislava.

Construction works, which began in 1989, ended with the Velvet Revolution in former Czechoslovakia. Afterwards, financial issues prevented the continuation of the metro plans. Until 2003, several attempts at resuming those plans were made, none of which were successful. The history of the project and its unrealised development are documented in the documentary 43 Years of Bratislava Metro, directed by Lucia Kašová.

== Trams Instead Metro Line ==
Instead Metro line, the city is now focusing on expanding its already existing tram network. On about the same path as intended for the metro in Petržalka, a tram line is now under construction. The first phase, from Šafárikovo square to the station Jungmannova across the rebuilt Starý most was built between 2013 and 2016, and opened on 8 July 2016. In the second phase, this line was extended to the Južné mesto (translateable as Southern city) terminal and was opened in July 2025. Construction of this part began in November 2021.
