= Czechoslovak State Railways =

Czech State owned railway

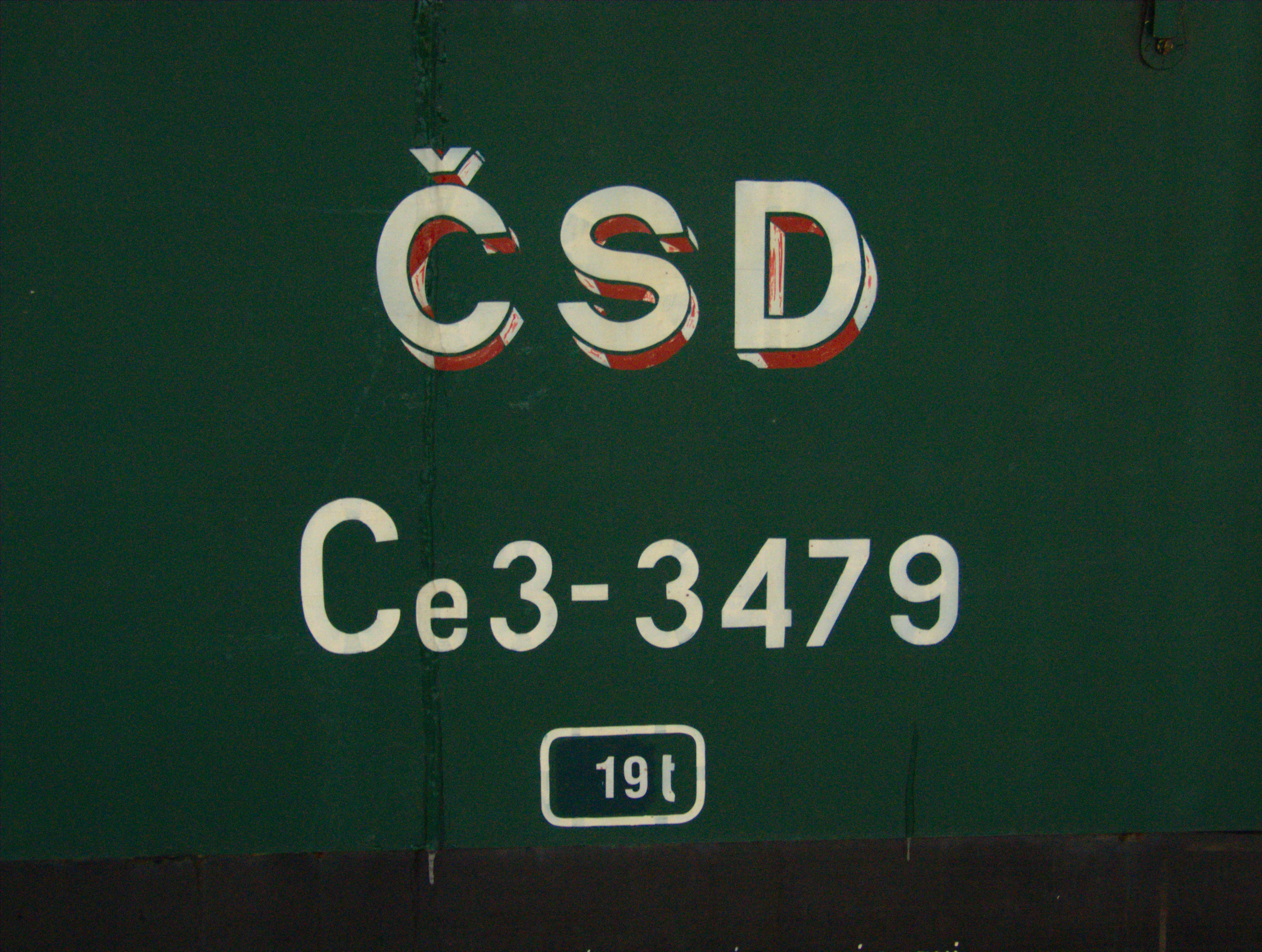
- Native name: Československé státní dráhy Československé štátne dráhy
- Industry: Rail transport
- Predecessor: Imperial Royal Austrian State Railways
- Founded: 1918
- Defunct: 1992
- Successors: České dráhy Railways of Slovak Republic
- Headquarters: Prague, Czechoslovakia

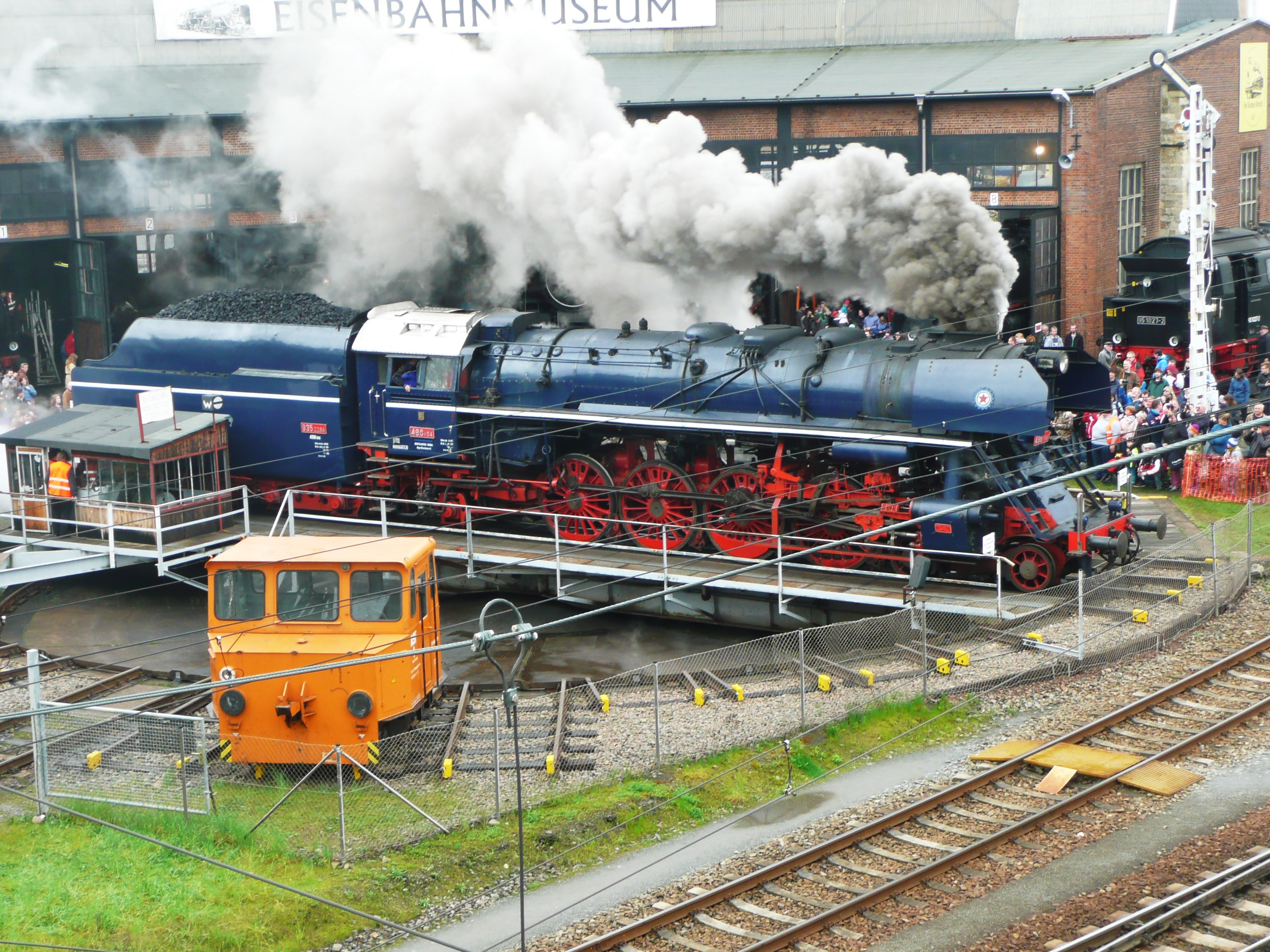
ČSD 498.104 "Albatros" - the last steam express passenger locomotive class built for the Czechoslovak State Railways

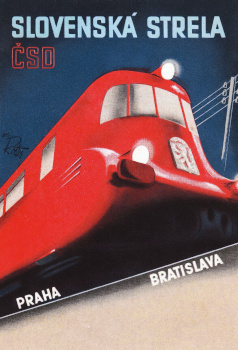
1930s poster featuring a ČSD Class M 290.0 railcar to advertise ČSD's Slovenská strela (Slovak Arrow) express passenger service

Czechoslovak State Railways (Československé státní dráhy in Czech or Československé štátne dráhy (Note: Since about 1990, the Česko-slovenské štátne dráhy (Czecho-Slovak State Railways) variant has actually become more common, after the Velvet Revolution in 1989 and since the beginning of the so-called “Hyphen War” – but until then, the first variant, Československé štátne dráhy (Czechoslovak State Railways), was used mostly) in Slovak, often abbreviated to ČSD) was the state-owned railway company of Czechoslovakia.

The company was founded in 1918 after the end of the First World War and dissolution of Austria-Hungary. It took over the rolling stock and infrastructure of the Imperial Royal Austrian State Railways.

In 1930 Czechoslovakia had 13,600 km (8,500 mi) of railways: the fifth-largest network in Europe. Of these 81% were state (ČSD)-owned, and the trend was to nationalize the remaining private railways. Most of the infrastructure was concentrated in the industrial regions of the Czech lands. 87% of the railroads were single-track. 135,000 people were employed on the railways: about 1% of the population.

When Nazi Germany dissolved Czechoslovakia in 1939, the Protectorate of Bohemia and Moravia formed the "Bohemian-Moravian Railway" company (in Czech Českomoravské dráhy-ČMD, in German Böhmisch-Mährische Bahn-BMB) under the control of Deutsche Reichsbahn (DR). In the Slovak State, the "Slovak Railways" company (in Slovak Slovenské železnice-SŽ) was formed.

In 1945, ČSD was re-established.

After the dissolution of Czechoslovakia at the end of 1992, the company was divided into the state-owned České dráhy (Czech Railways) and Železnice Slovenskej republiky (Railways of the Slovak Republic). The fixed infrastructure was transferred to the successor countries according to location; the remainder was divided by 2:1 ratio.

One of the many trains found in the state railway system, is the ČSD Class T478.3.

== Electrification ==
- Electrification of the railways started gradually during the 1920s. In Prague the trains used a direct current system at 1.5 kV.
- To power the line from Prague to Chop (Чоп, Čop, Ukraine State), a direct current system using 3 kV was built after 1945.
- To the north of this line, trains use direct current with voltage 3 kV, to the south they use alternating current with voltage 25 kV at 50 Hz. These two systems continue today.
