= Štrbské Pleso railway station =

Railway station in Štrbské Pleso, Slovakia

Štrbské Pleso
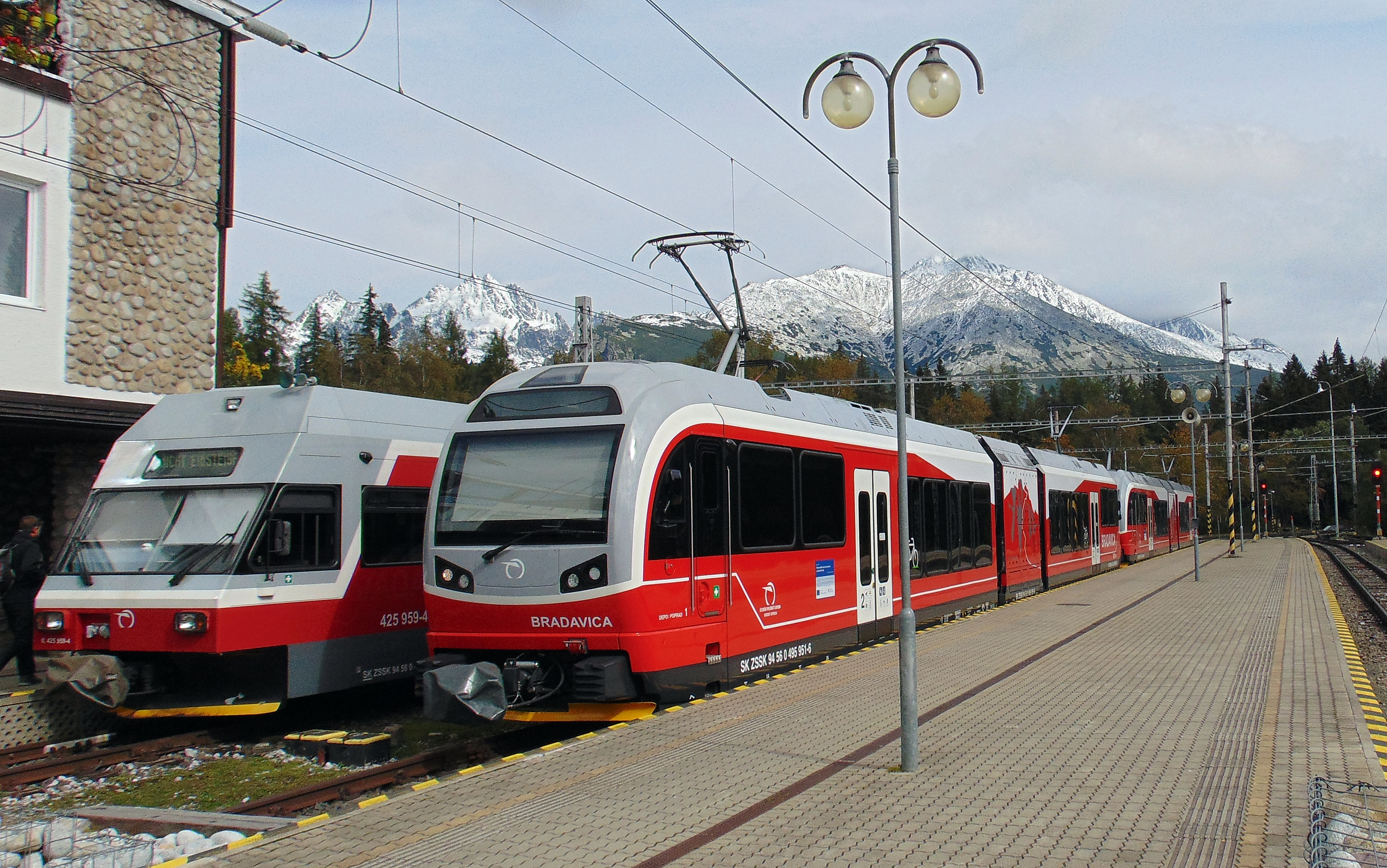

General information
- Location: Štrbské Pleso 2/19; 06201 Vysoké Tatry-Štrbské Pleso; Štrba; Poprad; Prešov Region; Slovakia
- Coordinates: 49°07′06″N 20°03′47″E
- Elevation: 1,350 m (4,430 ft)
- Owner: Železnice Slovenskej republiky (ŽSR)
- Operator: Železnice Slovenskej republiky
- Lines: 183 Poprad-Tatry–Štrbské Pleso; 182 Štrbské Pleso–Štrba
- Distance: 12.8 km (8.0 mi) from Poprad-Tatry
- Connections: Local buses

History
- Opened: 1970
Location
- Location within Slovakia

Štrbské Pleso railway station (Slovak: Železničná stanica Štrbské Pleso) is a junction station in the High Tatras. It serves the settlement of Štrbské Pleso, which is part of the village of Štrba, in the Prešov Region, northeastern Slovakia.

Opened in 1970, the station is the northwestern terminus of the main line operated by the metre gauge Tatra Electric Railway (TEŽ), and the mountain terminus of the Štrbské Pleso – Štrba rack railway, another metre gauge line. The station is also the highest point of both lines, and of the TEŽ as a whole, at 1,350 metres (4,430 ft) above sea level.

The station is currently owned by Železnice Slovenskej republiky (ŽSR); train services are operated by Železničná spoločnosť Slovensko (ZSSK).

== Location ==
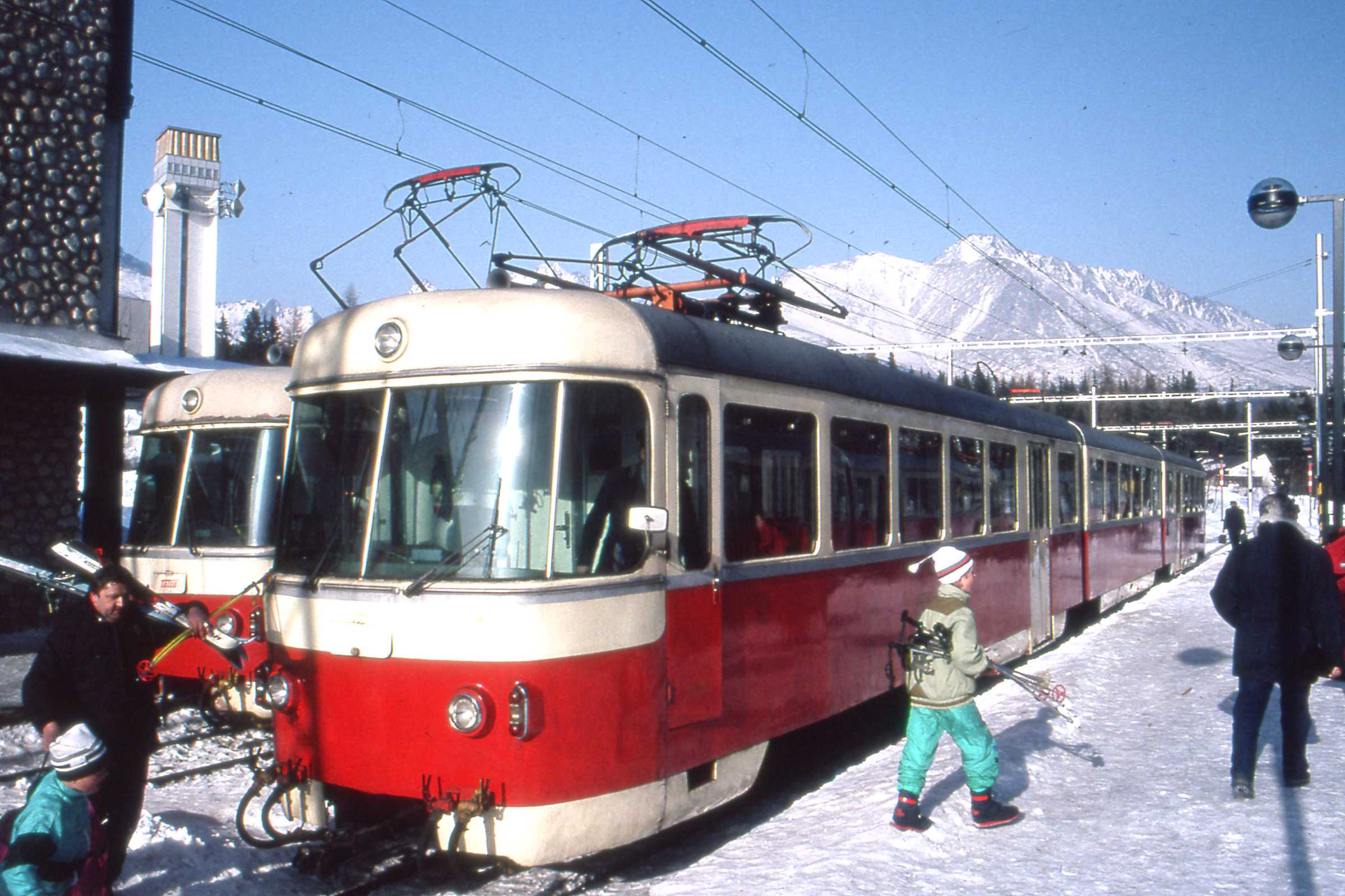
TEŽ class 420.95s (since withdrawn) at the station, 1993.

Štrbské Pleso railway station is right in the centre of the Štrbské Pleso village, across the road from the Hotel Toliar.

The Štrbské Pleso village is a ski, tourist, and health resort. It is adjacent to the town of Vysoké Tatry, a conglomerate of separate and different settlements (originally separate villages), the only common feature of which is that they are the main tourist resorts in the Slovak High Tatras.

These resorts are connected with Štrbské Pleso by a common railway network, the TEŽ.

== History ==
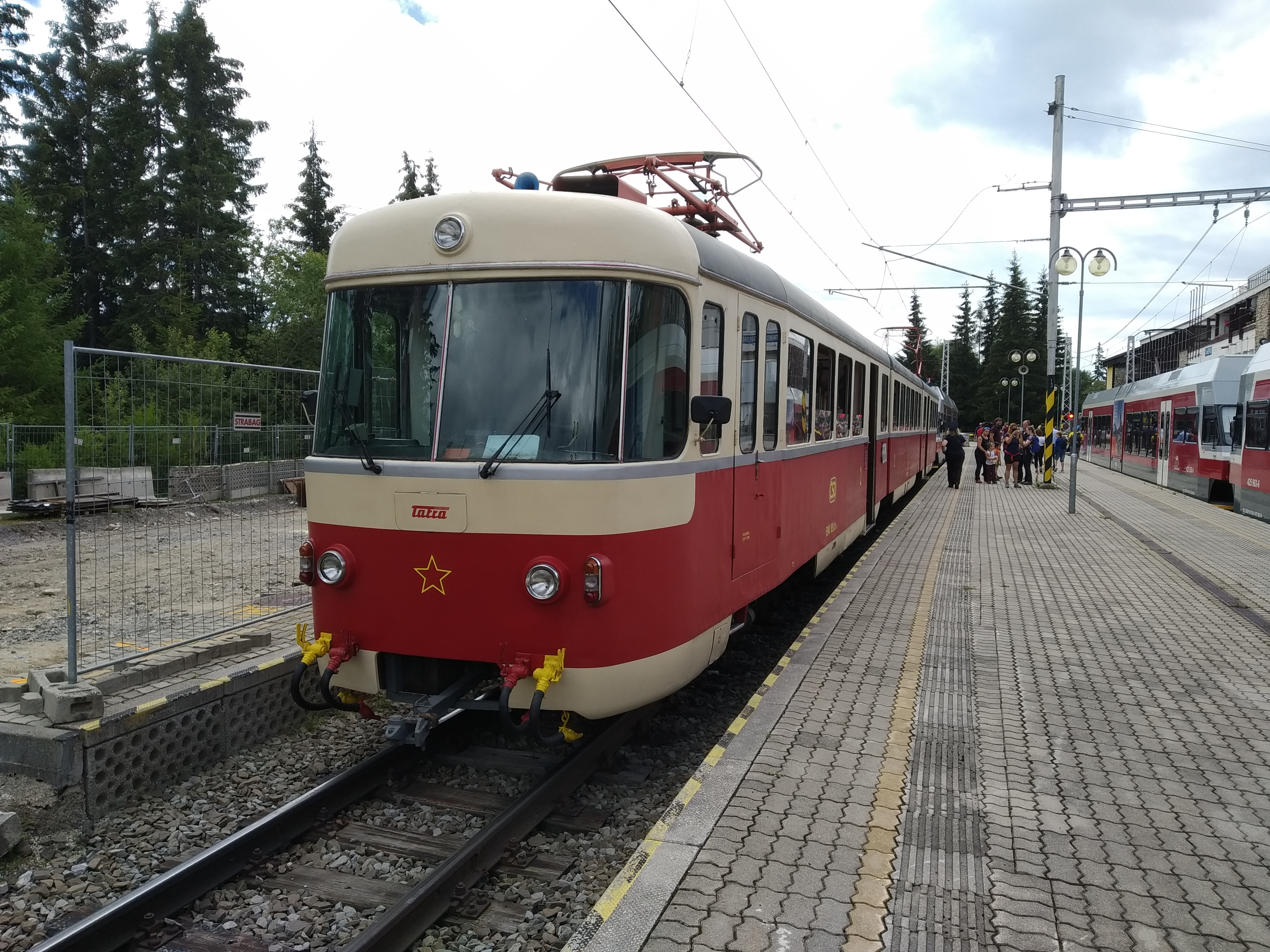
ŽSR Class 420.95 at Štrbské Pleso railway station, 2020

The current station was opened in 1970, for the FIS Nordic World Ski Championships 1970. It replaced an earlier station down by the lake, which had been opened on 13 August 1912.

== Facilities ==
The station building houses information and ticketing facilities, and a restaurant.

== Train services ==
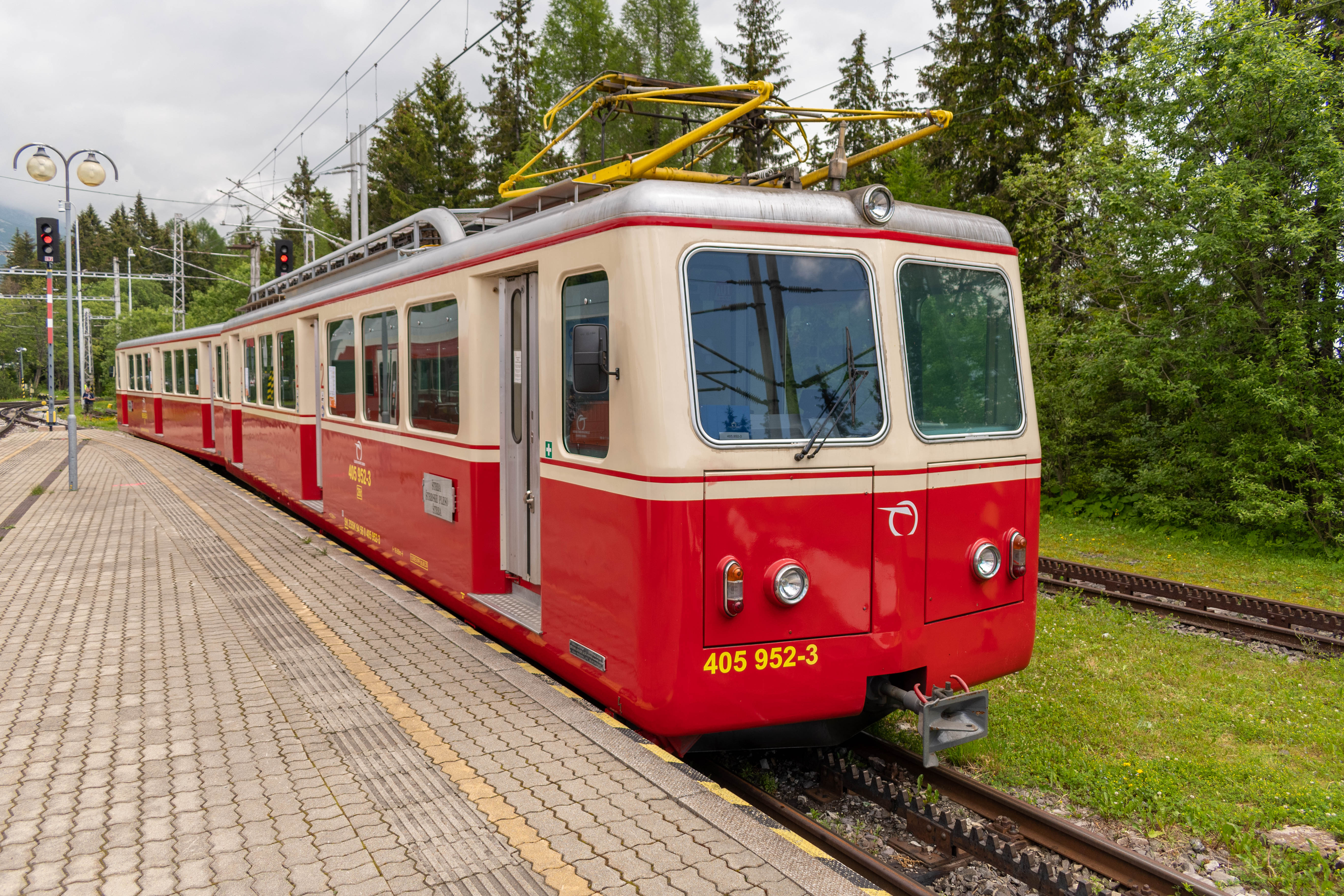
Rack railway class 405.95, 2020.

Štrbské Pleso railway station is the junction of the following High Tatras railway lines:

- 182 Štrba–Štrbské Pleso
- 183 Poprad-Tatry–Štrbské Pleso railway (the TEŽ's main line)

== Interchange ==
The station offers interchange with local buses.

== Services ==
Preceding station	ŽSSK	Following station
Terminus	Stopping trains Tatra Electric Railway	Popradské Pleso toward Poprad-Tatry
Tatranský Lieskovec toward Štrba	Stopping trains Štrbské Pleso – Štrba rack railway	Terminus

== See also ==
- History of rail transport in Slovakia
- Rail transport in Slovakia
