= ČSD Class EMU 29.0 =

Trains in Slovakia

ČSD Class EMU 29.0 ZSSK Class 405.95
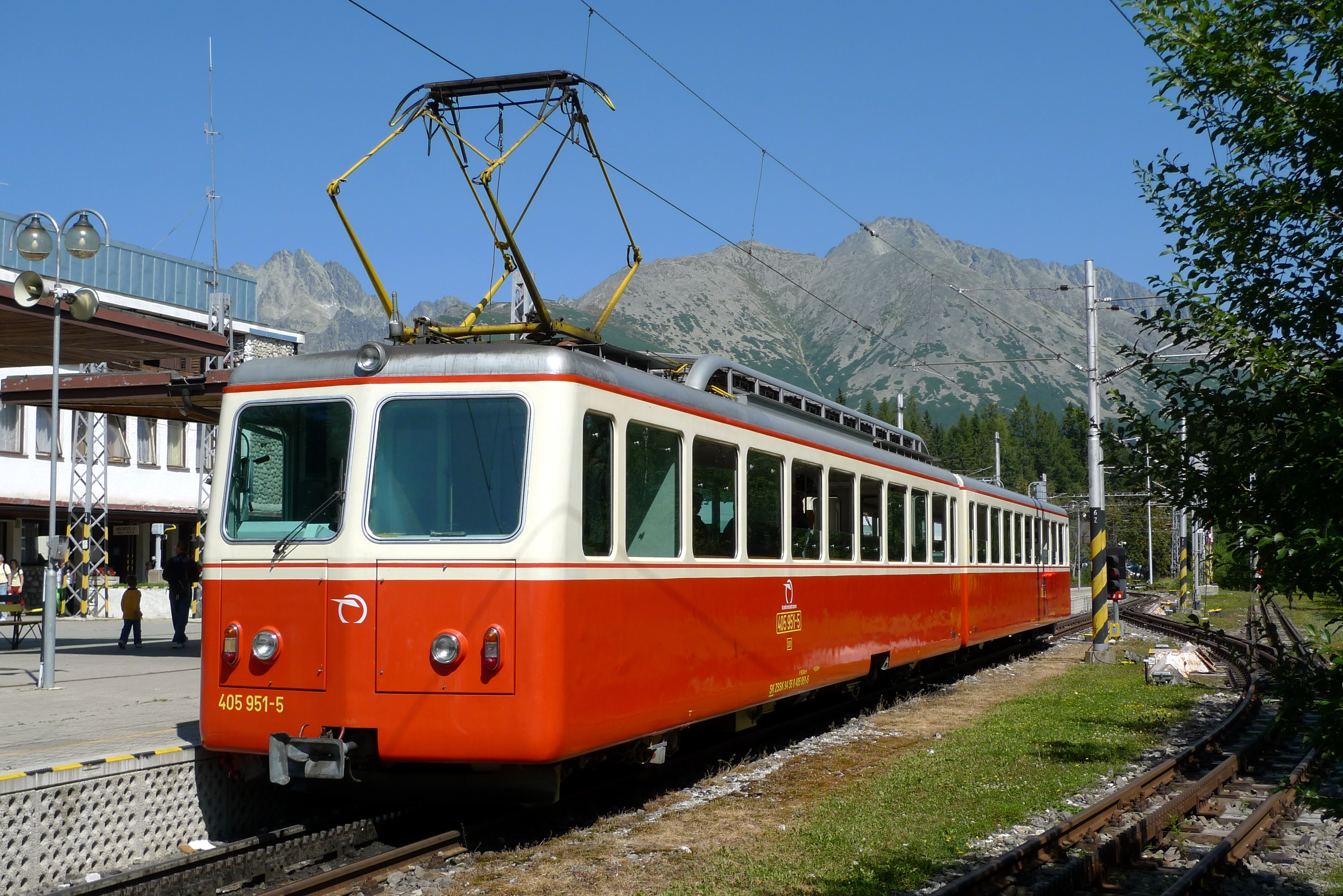
- A 405.95 class train at Štrbské Pleso.
- Manufacturers: SLM, Winterthur; BBC, Baden
- Constructed: 1969
- Entered service: 1970
- Number built: 3
- Number in service: 3
- Formation: Power car + control car.
- Fleet numbers: ČSD EMU 29.001–003; ZSSK 405.951–953
- Capacity: 124 seated 126 standing
- Operator: Železničná spoločnosť Slovensko (ZSSK)
- Depot: Štrba
- Line served: Štrbské Pleso – Štrba rack railway

Specifications
- Train length: 33,200 mm (108 ft 11 1/8 in)
- Maximum speed: Uphill: 20 km/h (12 mph); Downhill: 15 km/h (9 mph)
- Weight: 39 tonnes (38 long tons; 43 short tons)
- Traction system: 2 motors
- Power output: 340 kW (460 hp)
- Electric system: 1500 V DC overhead
- Current collection: Pantograph
- UIC classification: (A1)(A1)+ 2'2'
- Braking system: Electrodynamic
- Track gauge: 1,000 mm (3 ft 3 3/8 in) metre gauge

The former ČSD Class EMU 29.0, now known as the ZSSK Class 405.95, is a three member class of metre gauge, rack rail, electric multiple unit trains in service on the Štrbské Pleso – Štrba rack railway, in the Prešov Region of northeastern Slovakia.

== The introduction of the class ==
The rack railway is a 4.8 kilometres (3.0 mi) long line. It connects Štrba railway station, on the standard gauge Košice–Bohumín Railway, with Štrbské Pleso railway station, in the High Tatras ski, tourist, and health resort of Štrbské Pleso. The rack railway was opened in 1896, closed in 1932, and reopened in 1970 in time for that year's FIS Nordic World Ski Championships, which were held in the area.

To complete the revival of the rack railway, its then operator, the Czechoslovak State Railways (ČSD), had to acquire suitable rolling stock. As the former Czechoslovakia was not producing suitable vehicles, it was decided to purchase three two-car electric multiple unit (EMU) trains from the Swiss company Swiss Locomotive and Machine Works (SLM), Winterthur.

All members of the class were ordered in 1969, and entered service in 1970.

== Technical details ==
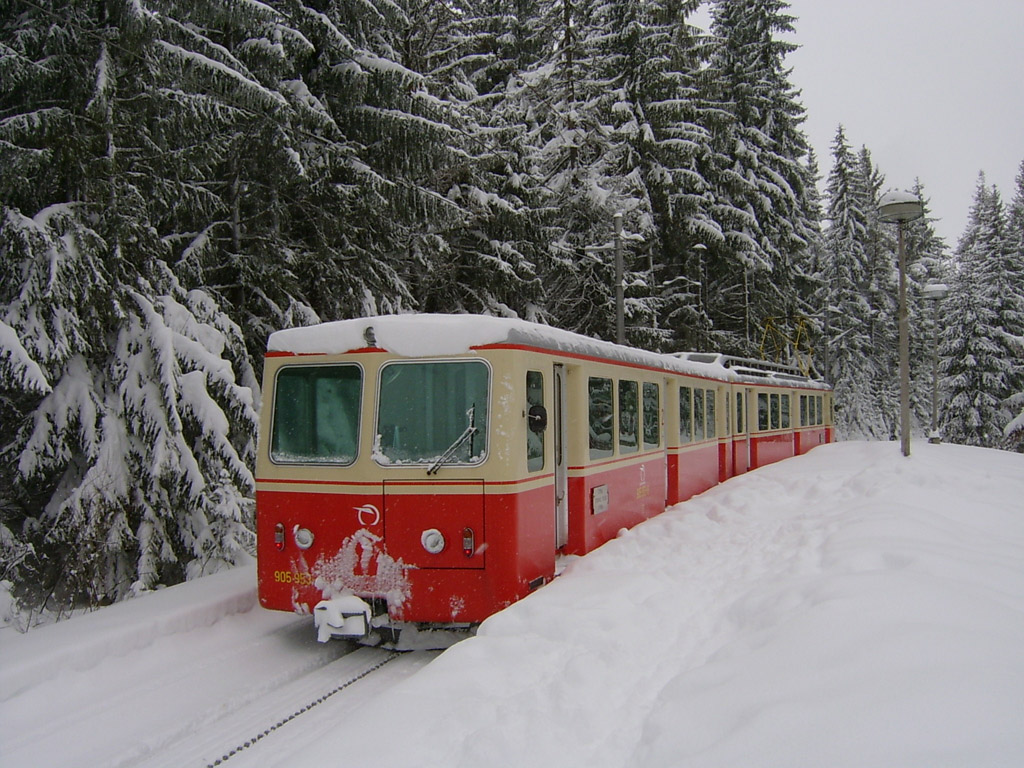
Winter operations, 2005.

The three EMUs are made up of a power car with electrical equipment by Brown, Boveri & Cie (BBC), Baden, Switzerland, and an unpowered, but otherwise largely identical, control car, which, if in service, is at the uphill end of the pair of cars. In peak times, a solo mode is possible using just the power car.

The design and construction of the class is broadly similar to other EMUs previously built for the Vitznau-Rigi-Bahn and the Arth-Rigi Bahn in Switzerland.

Each power car is fitted with two traction motors of 335 kW (450 hp) total output, delivered via shafts and gear drives, using a permanently operating cogwheel with a diameter of 573 mm (20 in). The units are also equipped with several brake systems - electrodynamic brake, ratchet parking brake and hydraulic and manual band brake.

All cars have a driver's compartment, and each pair of cars is connected by a passenger bridge, so that it is possible to switch between cars. Unit capacity is 124 seated and 126 standing places. For quick boarding and alighting, each car was fitted with three doors on one side only; a pair of cars therefore has six doors.

The two tone livery is cream at window level and red on the lower sides. Roofs are coloured silver. The original factory paint job was of such high quality that even after 40 years of operation the units had never been repainted.

== Service history ==
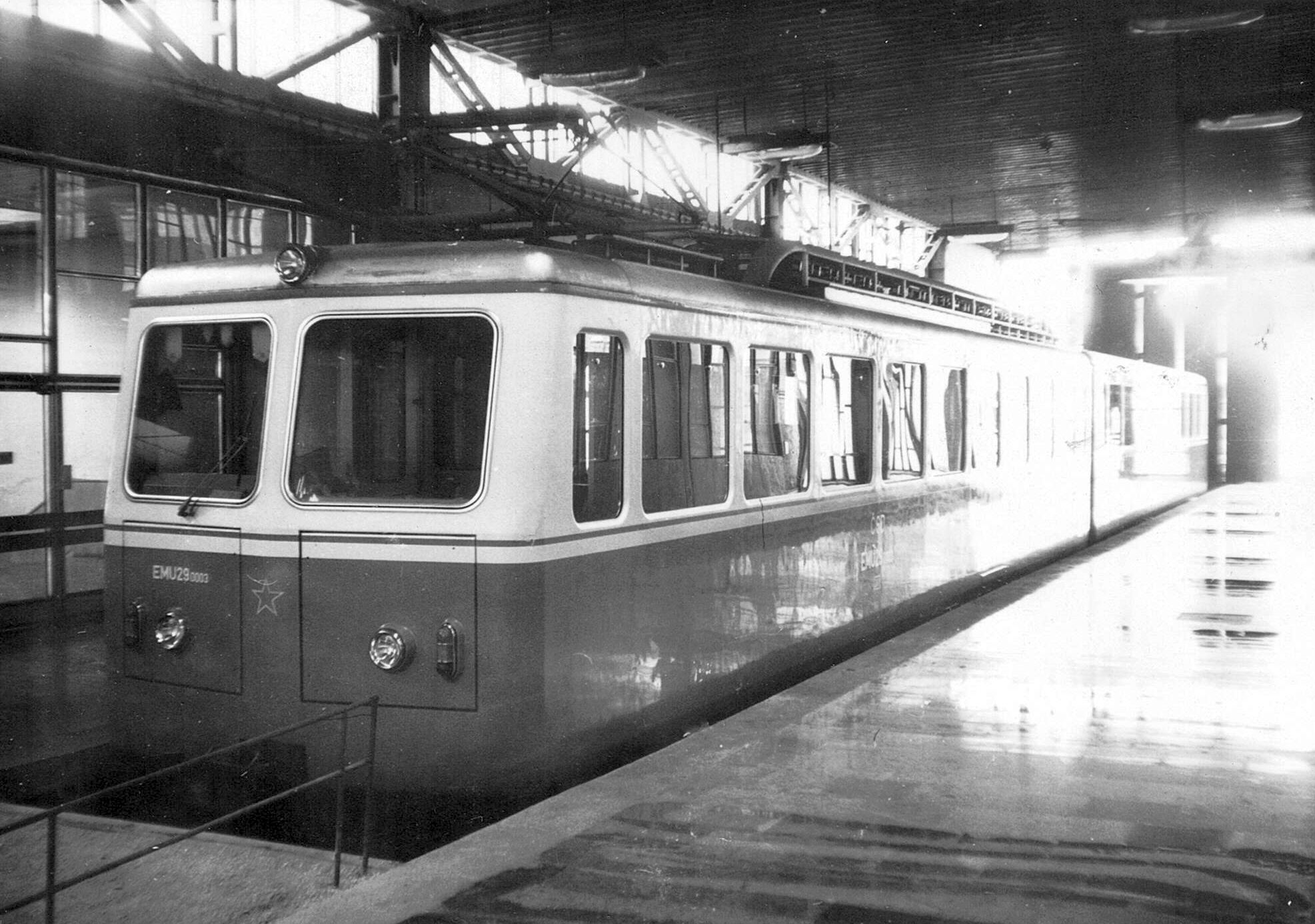
One of the units at Štrba, 1983.

Until the breakup of the former Czechoslovakia in 1993, the three class members, and the rack railway itself, were owned and operated by the ČSD. The power cars were originally designated as ČSD Class EMU 29.0, and the control cars as Class R 29.0.

Since entering service, the class has been an integral part of passenger transport in the High Tatras. Renowned for their reliability, its members have been very successful in operation, and remain in service today. However, they cannot be operated on the adhesive only Tatra Electric Railway (TEŽ). For that reason, they are stabled and maintained at Štrba; major repairs are carried out at Poprad.

In 1988, the class was redesignated as Class 405.95. From 1993, the rack railway and the class were owned and operated by Železnice Slovenskej republiky (ŽSR). Since 2002, the operator has been Železničná spoločnosť Slovensko (ZSSK).

Regular operation of the class ended in July 2020 when a complete reconstruction of the rack railway began. The railway reopened in early 2022 with new 495.95 units.

== See also ==
- ČSD Class EMU 89.0
- ZSSK Class 425.95
