= Štrbské Pleso–Štrba rack railway =

Railway in Slovakia

Coordinates: 49°5′2″N 20°3′56″E

Overview
- Owner: Železnice Slovenskej republiky (ŽSR)
- Locale: Slovakia

Service
- Operator(s): Železničná spoločnosť Slovensko (ZSSK)

Technical
- Track gauge: 1,000 mm (3 ft 3 3/8 in) metre gauge
- Electrification: 1,500 V DC

Scheme of the Štrbské Pleso–Štrba rack railway

The Štrbské Pleso–Štrba rack railway is a 1,000 mm (3 ft 3 3/8 in) gauge narrow-gauge railway in the High Tatras. It was built in 1896 and reconstructed in 1970. At the valley terminus (Štrba railway station), it connects to the standard-gauge main line between Bratislava and Košice, and at the mountain terminus (Štrbské Pleso railway station), it connects to the Tatra Electric Railway.

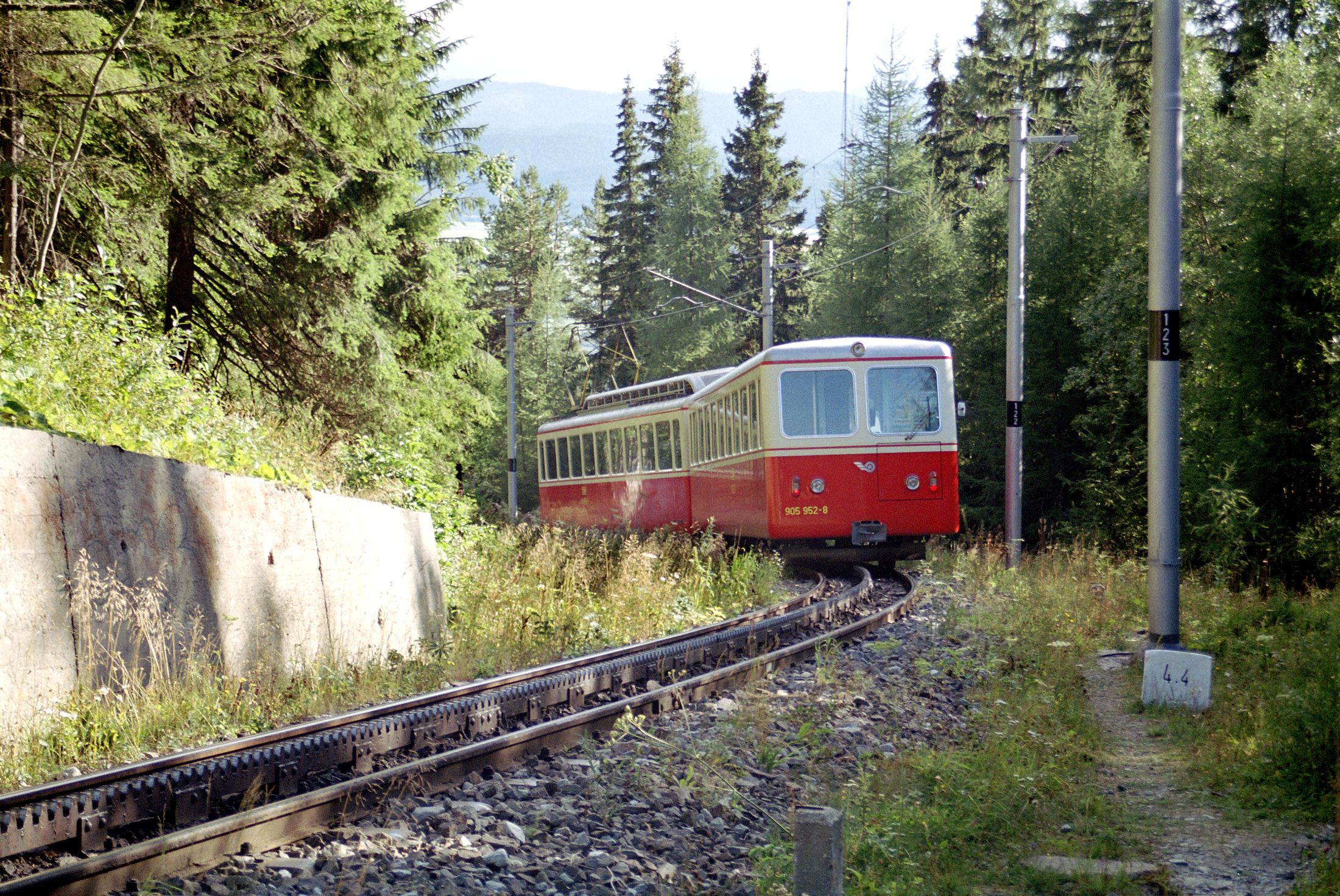
Multiple unit 405.95 driving down to Štrba, near the Štrbské Pleso station

== Old rack railway ==
=== History ===
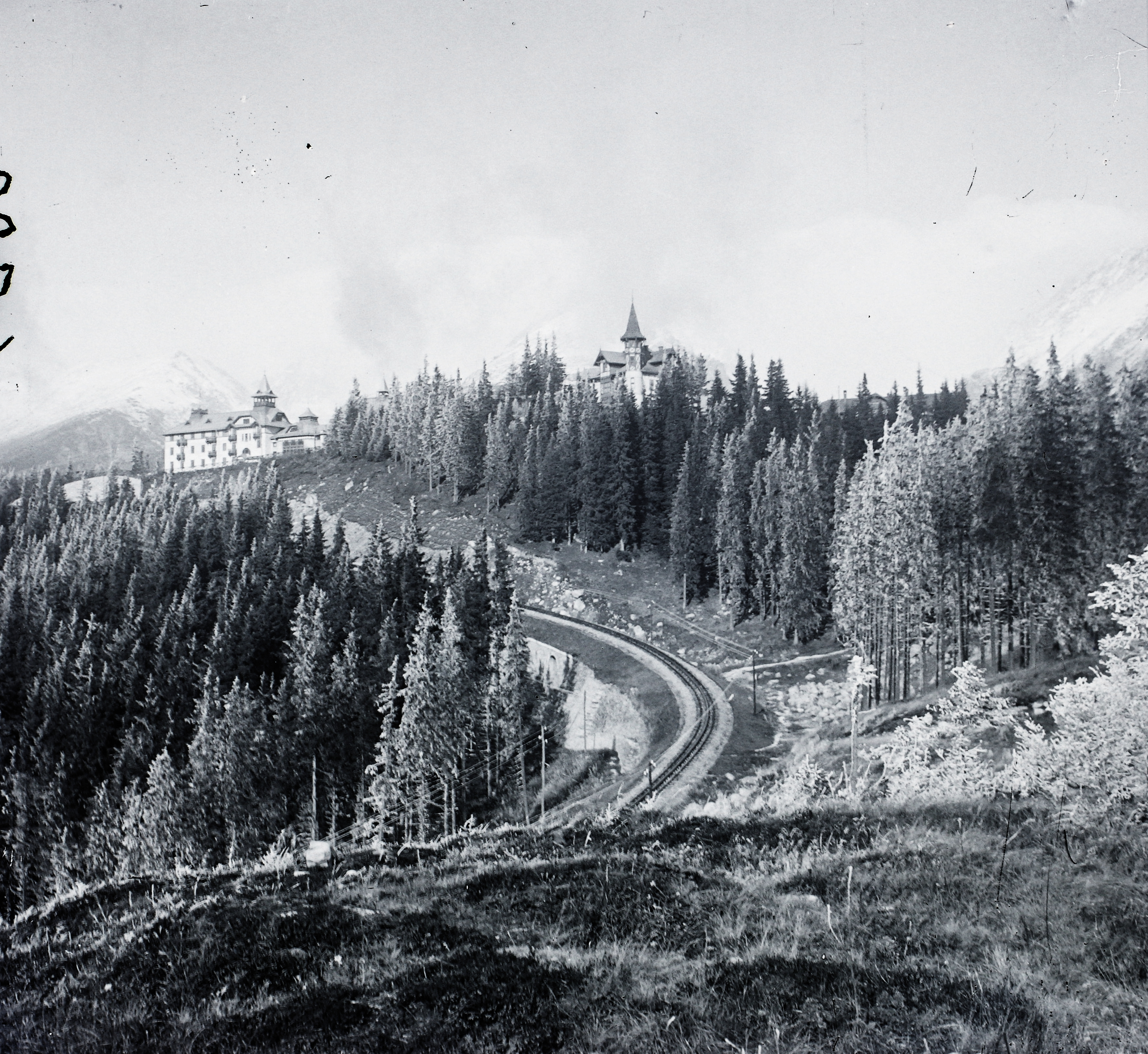
Rack railway near Štrbské pleso, 1906

With the completion of the Košice–Bohumín Railway in 1871, the High Tatras received their first railway connection. Tourism to Štrbské pleso arising from this led to the opening of hotels, footpaths and mountain huts.

Under the management of Emil Várnai, the Košice–Bohumín Railway developed plans for a metre-gauge rack railway connecting Štrbské pleso to the station at Štrba. On 30 July 1895, the railway received a concession from the Hungarian Trade Ministry. Building began quickly and the railway opened on 30 July 1896. The Košice–Bohumín Railway founded the Csorbatói Fogaskerekű Vasút (Slovak: Ozubnicová železnica Štrbského plesa, English: Štrbské Pleso Rack Railway) to operate the railway. The line was only operated during the summer season between June and September and in winter for the ski season. For more than six months of the year, there was no traffic.

From the 1920s there was strong competition from motor transport and the railway was no longer profitable. In 1924 the railway (together with the Košice–Bohumín Railway) was taken over by the Czechoslovak State Railways. The Tatranská elektrická vicinálna dráha (TEVD) was founded in 1927 to operate the Tatra Electric Railway but refused to take over the old and inefficient rack railway.

During the Great Depression traffic on the rack railway was ended on 14 September 1932. On 11 December 1936, the concession to operate the railway ended and in the 1940s the line was dismantled.

=== Technical data ===
- Gauge: 1,000 mm (3 ft 3 3/8 in) metre gauge
- Rack railway system: Riggenbach
- Length: 4.757 km (2.956 mi)
- Maximum gradient: 12.7%
- Traction: steam
- Year of opening: 1896
- Height difference: 444 m (1,457 ft)

=== Rolling stock ===
In 1896 two steam locomotives were delivered from the Floridsdorf Locomotive Factory, Austria, with manufacturer's numbers 1012 and 1013. Four identical locomotives, which are still in service, were later built for the Achenseebahn.

The locomotives were originally numbered 1 and 2 but were renumbered by ČSD as U 29.001 and U 29.002. There were also four passenger carriages and four goods wagons which were built by Ganz in Budapest.

== New rack railway ==
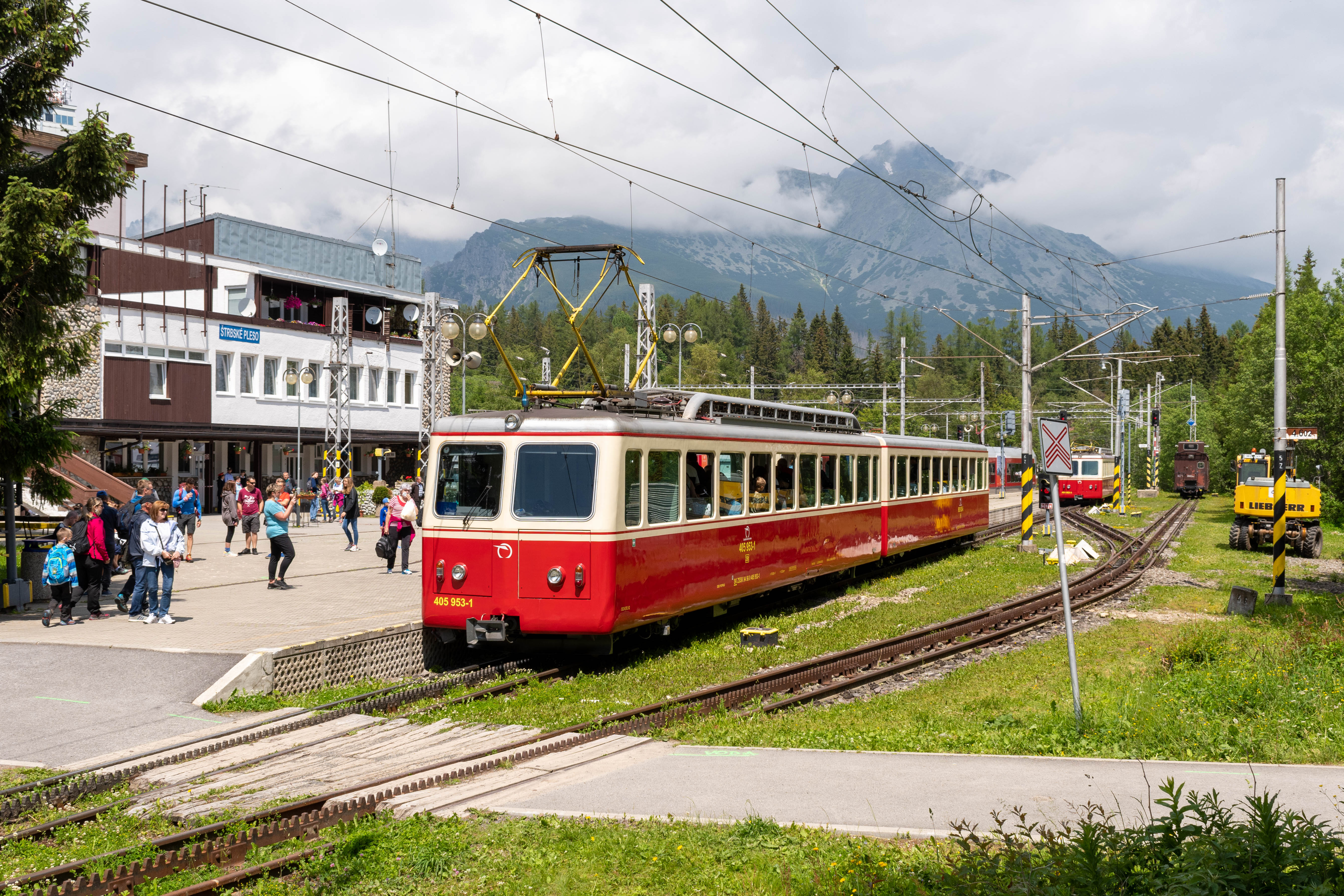
Multiple unit 405.95 at the Štrbské Pleso station

=== History ===
In 1968, in connection with the FIS Nordic World Ski Championships 1970 in Štrbské Pleso, plans were made for a new rack railway. Two-thirds of the old route was used but the rest of the route was entirely new. In Štrbské Pleso a new joint railway station with the Tatra Electric Railway was laid out, with a track connection for transferring vehicles. At Štrba railway station a new departure hall for the rack railway was built. The new railway was electrified at 1500 V DC, the same system as that used for the Tatra Electric Railway. The new railway was opened on 12 February 1970.

On 6 July 2020, the line was closed for renovation, with buses providing alternative connection. The works were expected to finish by 6 February 2021.

=== Technical data ===
- Gauge: 1,000 mm (3 ft 3 3/8 in) metre gauge
- Rack railway system: von Roll
- Length: 4.75 km (2.95 mi)
- Maximum gradient: 15%
- Traction: electric
- Year of opening: 1970

=== Rolling stock ===
Three new trains were delivered from Swiss Locomotive and Machine Works for the rebuilt line. The trains consisted of a driving trailer of ČSD class R 29.0 (now ZSSK class 905.95) and a rack railcar of ČSD class EM 29.0 (now ZSSK class 405.95). These were operated in regular traffic until 2020.

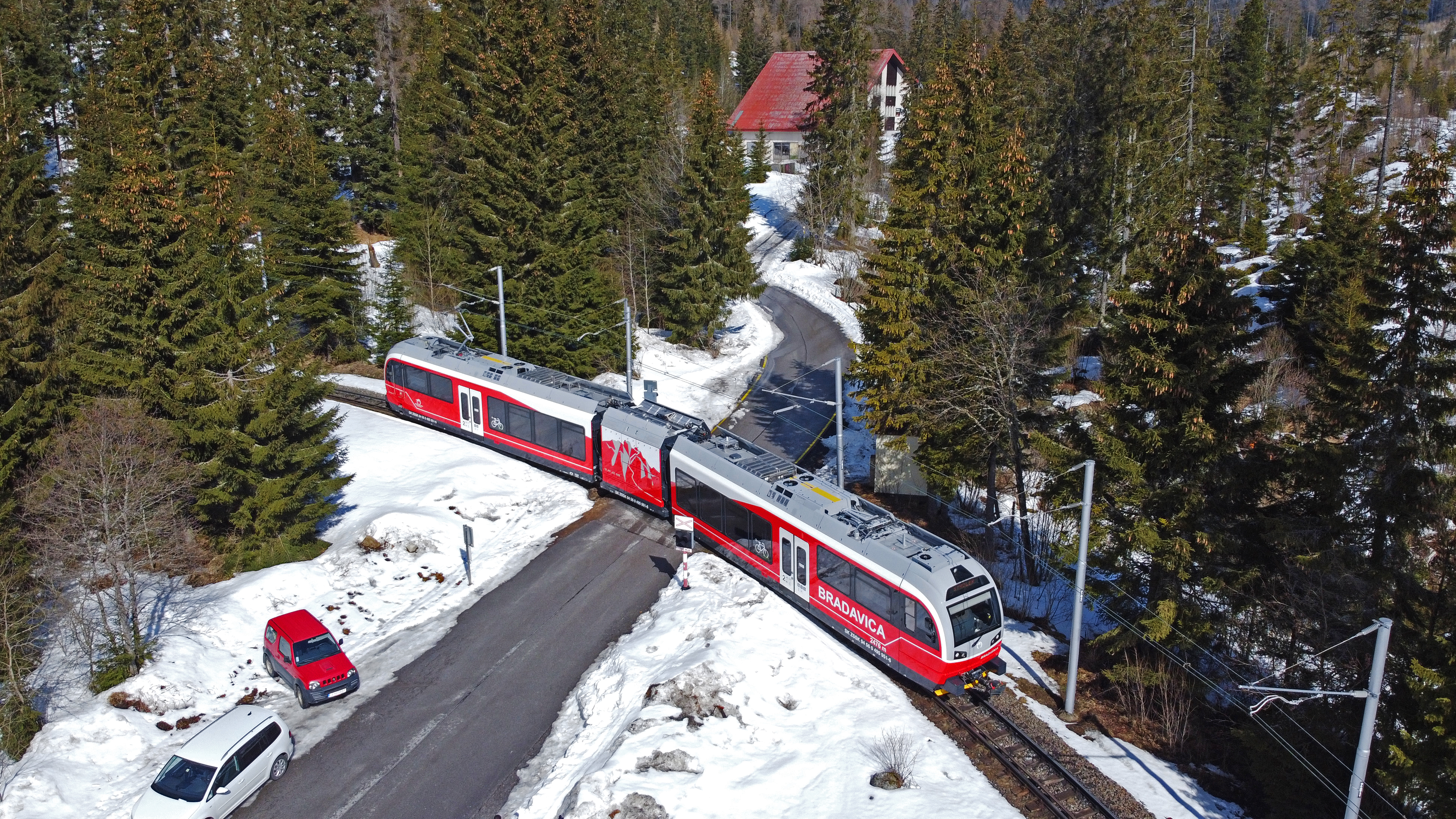
Multiple unit 495.95 on a test run on an adhesive track Starý Smokovec – Štrbské Pleso

On 14 January 2021 Stadler delivered the first of five GTW 2/6 three-car electric multiple units for the line. The new units, classed as 495.95, are capable of running in adhesive as well as rack mode, allowing them to run on the Tatra Electric Railway track as well. The order also includes a universal locomotive class 485.95 and a snow plough, these were delivered on 22 January. The fifth and final EMU was delivered in mid-July 2021. On 2 August 2021 the units were approved for passenger operation.
