= Štrba railway station =

Railway station in Slovakia

Štrba
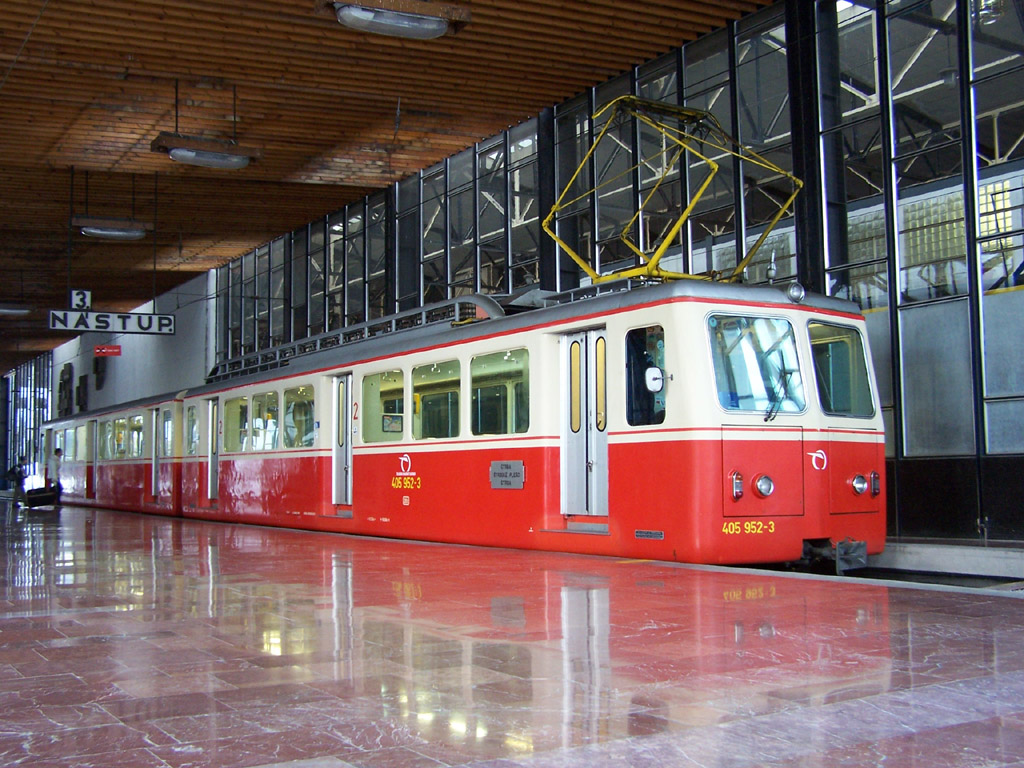
- A class 405.95 rack railway train at the station

General information
- Location: Železničná; 05938 Tatranská Štrba; Štrba; Poprad; Prešov Region; Slovakia
- Coordinates: 49°05′02″N 20°03′56″E
- Elevation: 895 m (2,936 ft)
- Owner: Železnice Slovenskej republiky (ŽSR)
- Operator: Železnice Slovenskej republiky
- Lines: Košice–Bohumín; 182 Štrbské Pleso–Štrba
- Distance: 218.32 km (135.66 mi) from Slovakia–Ukraine border
- Connections: Local buses

History
- Opened: 8 December 1871; 154 years ago
Location
- Location within Slovakia

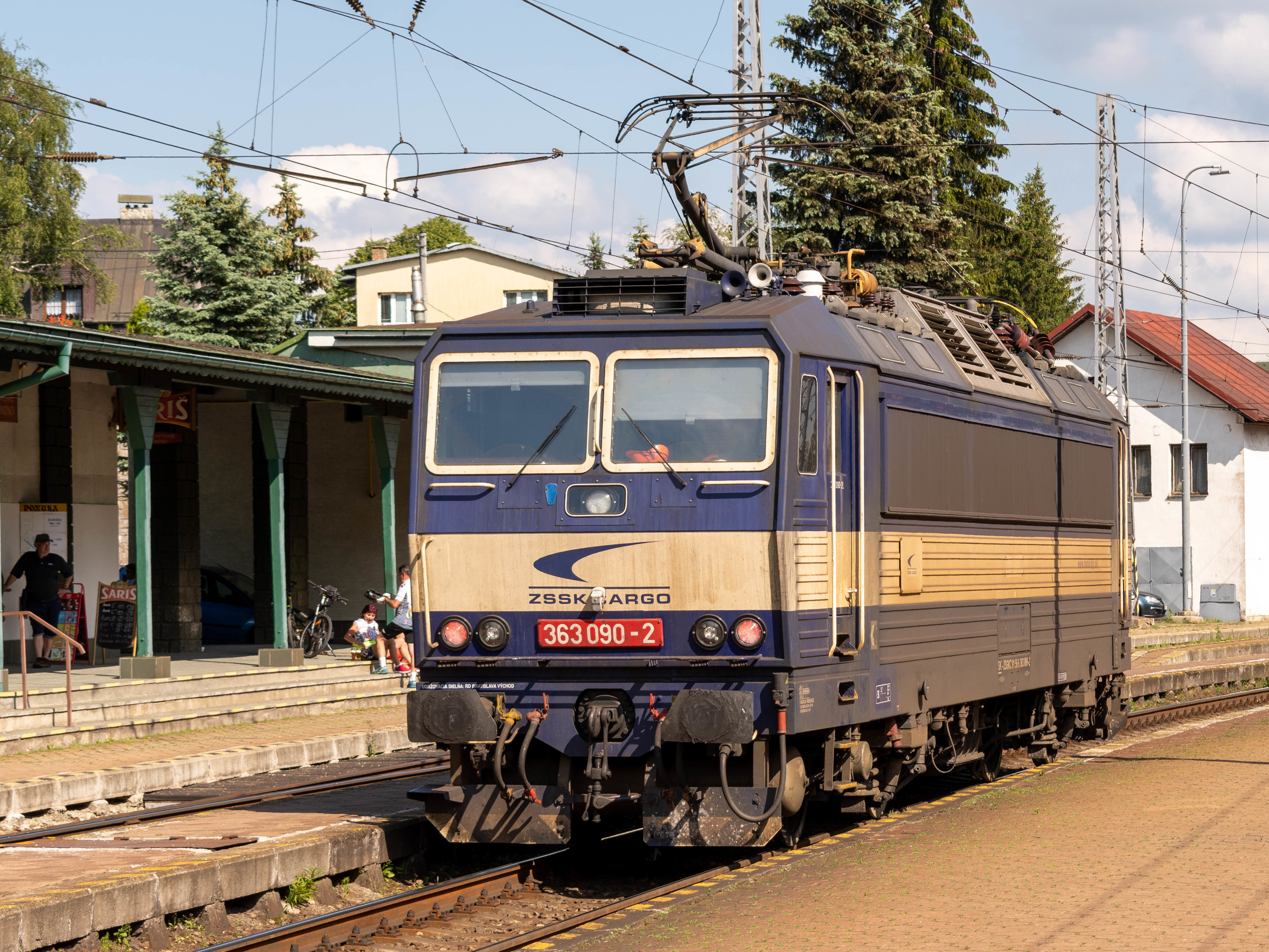
Locomotive of SK Class 363 at the station

Štrba railway station (Hungarian: Csorba vasútállomás; Slovak: Železničná stanica Štrba) is a break-of-gauge junction station serving the village of Štrba, in the Prešov Region, northeastern Slovakia.

The station forms part of the standard gauge Košice–Bohumín Railway (KBD), and is the highest point on that line. It is also the junction between the KBD and the Štrbské Pleso – Štrba rack railway, a metre gauge line of which it is the valley terminus. As such, the station is a gateway to the High Tatras mountain range, a popular tourist destination.

The station is currently owned by Železnice Slovenskej republiky (ŽSR); train services are operated by Železničná spoločnosť Slovensko (ZSSK).

== Location ==
Štrba railway station is located in the borough of Tatranská Štrba, about 4 kilometres (2.5 mi) from the centre of the village.

== History ==
The station was opened in 8 December 1871, upon the commissioning of the KBD's Žilina–Poprad section. It became a junction when the rack railway opened in 1896.

Although the rack railway was closed in 1932 and lifted soon afterwards, it was reconstructed at the end of the 1960s, and reopened in 1970 in time for that year's FIS Nordic World Ski Championships.

== Facilities ==
The three storey station building houses information and ticketing facilities, and a restaurant.

The standard gauge station yard has tracks equipped with low level platforms for passenger services, and tracks for freight workings and the stabling of rolling stock.

The current rack railway terminus is in an upper section of the station dating from the reconstruction of the rack railway in 1970.

== Train services ==
Štrba railway station is the junction of the following Slovakian railway lines:

- 180 Košice–Žilina (part of the Košice–Bohumín Railway)
- 182 Štrba–Štrbské Pleso

Line 180 forms part of Slovakia's main east–west rail corridor, and is also part of Pan-European Corridor Va, which runs from Venice in Italy to Kyiv in Ukraine, via Bratislava, Žilina, Košice and Uzhhorod.

== Interchange ==
The station offers interchange with local buses.

== Services ==
Preceding station	ŽSSK	Following station
Liptovský Mikuláš toward Žilina	Regional fast trains	Poprad-Tatry toward Košice
Važec toward Žilina	Stopping trains	Štrba zastávka toward Košice
Tatranský Lieskovec toward Štrbské Pleso	Stopping trains Štrbské Pleso – Štrba rack railway	Terminus

== See also ==
- History of rail transport in Slovakia
- Rail transport in Slovakia
