= Štrba =

- Municipality
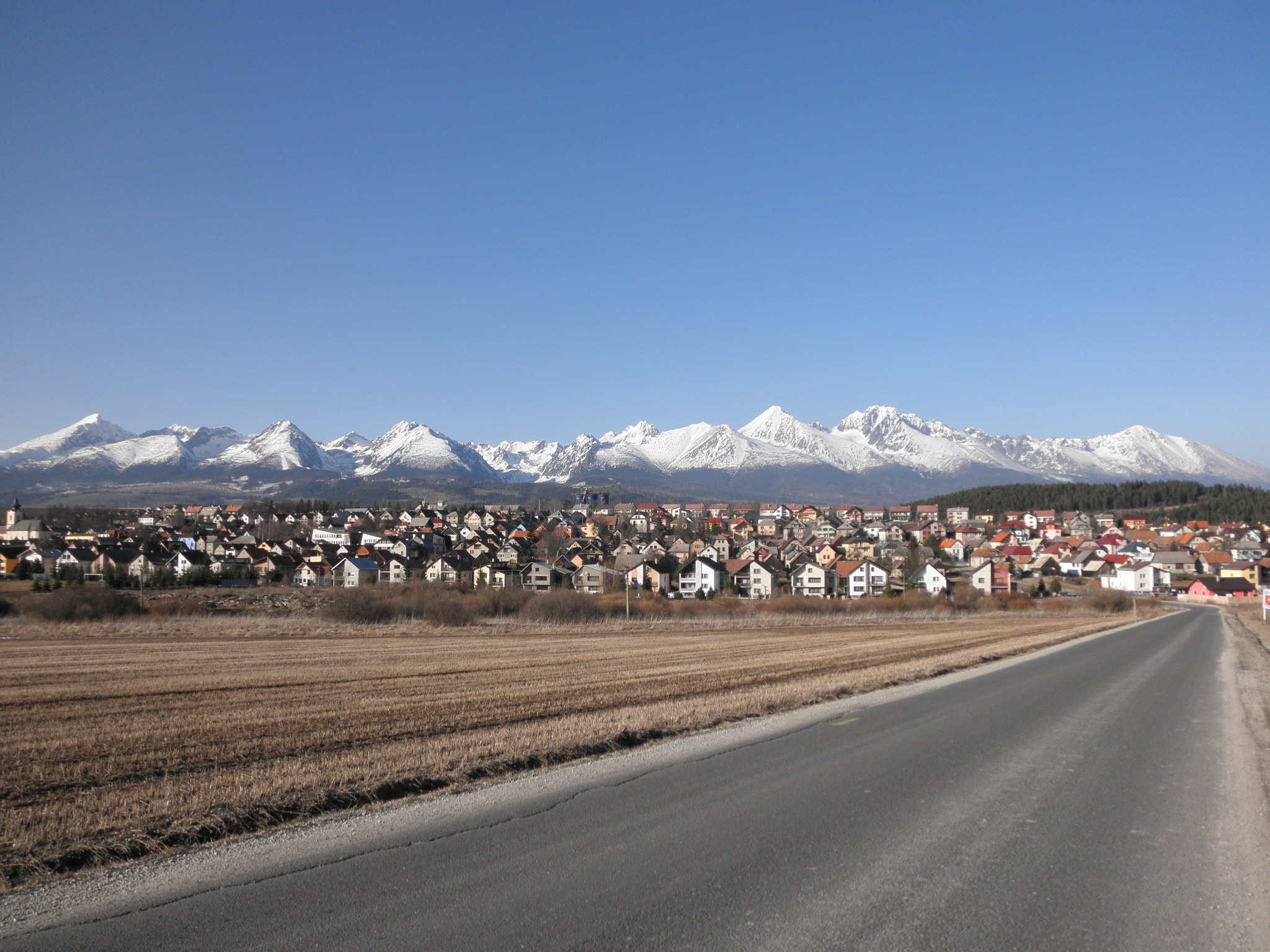

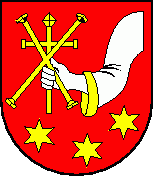
- Flag Coat of arms

- Location of Štrba in the Prešov Region Location of Štrba in Slovakia
- Coordinates: 49.07°N 20.07°E
- Country: Slovakia
- Region: Prešov Region
- District: Poprad District
- First mentioned: 1280

Area
  - Total: 42.96 km^{2} (16.59 sq mi)
- Elevation: 1,020 m (3,350 ft)

Population (2025)
  - Total: 3,306
- Time zone: UTC+1 (CET)
  - Summer (DST): UTC+2 (CEST)
- Postal code: 593 8
- Area code: +421 52
- Vehicle registration plate (until 2022): PP

Štrba (Hungarian: Csorba, German: Tschirm) is a village in the Poprad District, Prešov Region, northern Slovakia. It is situated in the Sub-Tatra Basin, which separates the High Tatras and Low Tatras at the European continental divide between the Baltic and the Black Sea. It is approximately 16 km (9.9 mi) west of the city of Poprad.

== Etymology ==
Slovak Štrba, Štrbina—a narrow place (a gap, a cleft, etc.). The name is probably related to an old trade route between Liptov and Spiš. The Hungarian (1321 Csorba/Chorba) and the German name (1431 Tschirban) come from the Slovak.

== History ==
Historical records first mention Štrba in 1280 as a medieval village of the Kingdom of Hungary. The village owns the lands around the mountain glacial lake, and now resort, of Štrbské pleso, to which it gave its name. Locals had started to profit from the construction of High Tatras facilities at the end of 19th century.

== Geography ==
The municipality lies at an altitude of 1,020 metres (3,350 ft) and covers an area of 42.96 km^{2} (16.59 sq mi) (2025). Its detached borough of Tatranská Štrba hosts the Štrba railway station, the valley terminus of the Štrbské Pleso–Štrba rack railway, and a stop on one of Slovakia's major railways. The mountain resort settlement of Štrbské Pleso also belongs to the village.

== Population ==
Population statistic (10 years)
Year	1995	2005	2015	2025
Count	3825	3619	3504	3306
Difference		−5.38%	−3.17%	−5.65%

Population statistic
Year	2024	2025
Count	3337	3306
Difference		−0.92%

It has a population of 3306 people (31 December 2025).

=== Ethnicity ===
Census 2021 (1+ %)
Ethnicity	Number	Fraction
Slovak	3256	95.34%
Not found out	99	2.89%
Romani	95	2.78%
Czech	45	1.31%
Total	3415	

In year 2021 was 3415 people by ethnicity 3256 as Slovak, 99 as Not found out, 95 as Romani, 45 as Czech, 16 as Other, 12 as Hungarian, 11 as Rusyn, 10 as Russian, 8 as German, 3 as Polish, 3 as Moravian, 2 as Turkish, 2 as Canadian, 1 as Jewish, 1 as Ukrainian, 1 as Italian and 1 as Bulgarian.

Note on population: The difference values of population numbers in the table "Population statistic" and in the sections "Ethnicity" & "Religion" is caused by the use of various statistical methods.

=== Religion ===
Census 2021 (1+ %)
Religion	Number	Fraction
Roman Catholic Church	1351	39.56%
Evangelical Church	1188	34.79%
None	625	18.3%
Not found out	89	2.61%
Greek Catholic Church	65	1.9%
Total	3415	

In year 2021 was 3415 people by religion 1351 from Roman Catholic Church, 1188 from Evangelical Church, 625 from None, 89 from Not found out, 65 from Greek Catholic Church, 15 from Apostolic Church, 15 from Ad hoc movements, 9 from Calvinist Church, 9 from Other and not ascertained christian church, 9 from Christian Congregations in Slovakia, 7 from United Methodist Church, 6 from Eastern Orthodox Church, 6 from Seventh-day Adventist Church, 5 from Other, 4 from Paganism and natural spirituality, 4 from Buddhism, 2 from Jehovah's Witnesses, 2 from Islam, 1 from Czechoslovak Hussite Church, 1 from Church of the Brethren, 1 from Baptists Church and 1 from Bahá'i Community.
