= Štrbské Pleso =

Ski, tourist, and health resort in the High Tatras, Slovakia

Coordinates: 49°07′N 20°04′E

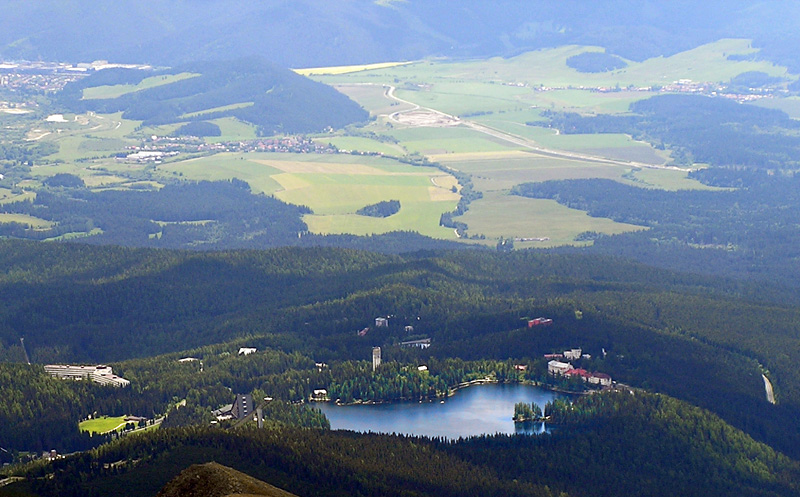
The commercial and residential buildings near the glacial lake make up the community of Štrbské Pleso.

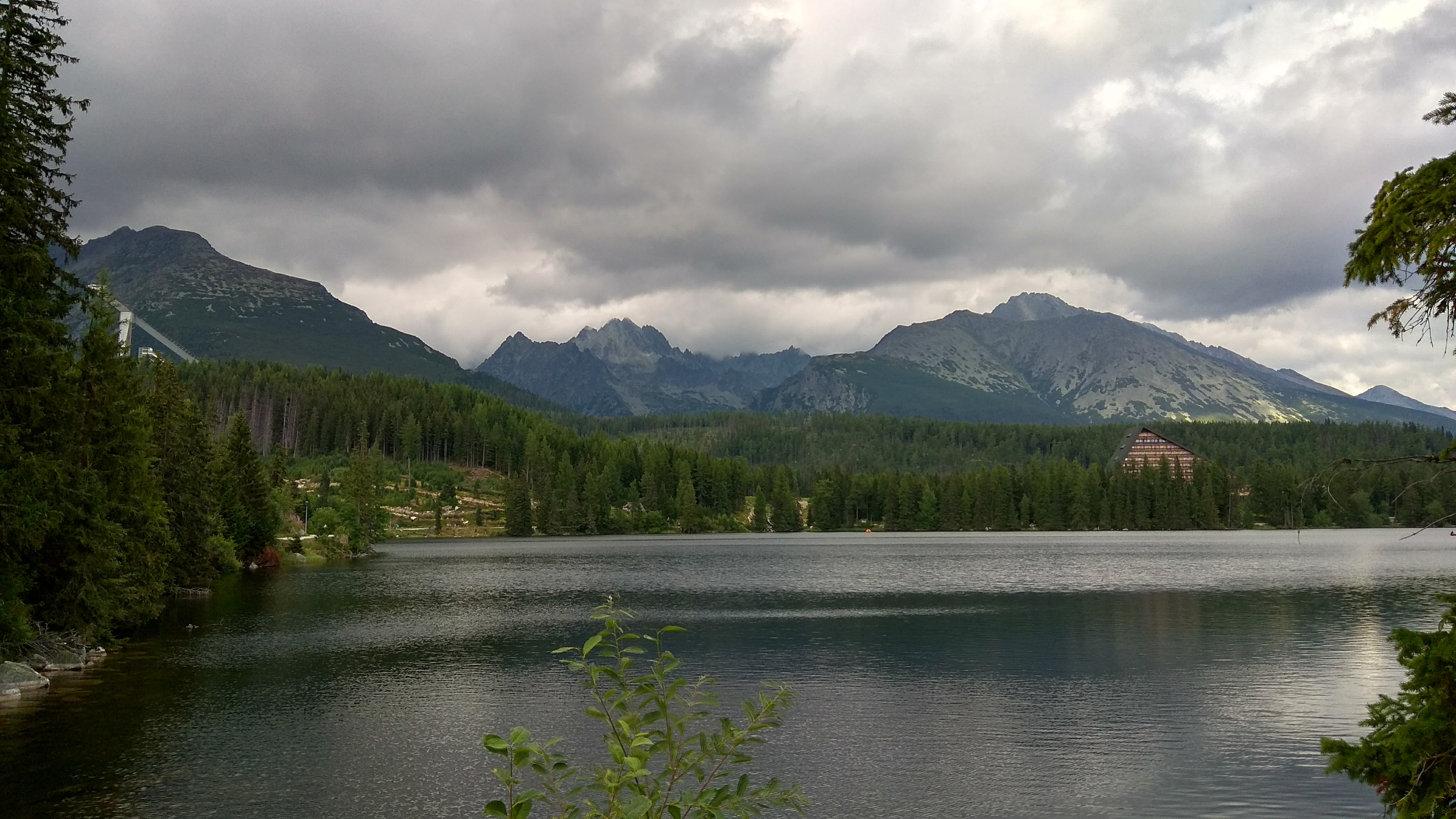
View of the lake

Štrbské Pleso (German: Tschirmer See; Hungarian: Csorbató or Csorba-tó; Polish: Szczyrbskie Jezioro) is a ski, tourist, and health resort in the High Tatras, Slovakia located on the lake by the same name. With extensive parking facilities and a stop on the Tatra trolley and rack railway, it is a starting point for a host of popular hikes including to Kriváň and Rysy.

== Municipality ==
Coat of arms of Štrbské Pleso

Štrbské Pleso is part of the municipal lands of the village of Štrba. It was incorporated in the municipality of Vysoké Tatry from 1947 until 2007. The ownership reverted to Štrba on 1 January 2008 when the Supreme Court's decision of 14 August 2007 took effect. Štrbské Pleso comprises the commercial and residential buildings in the vicinity of the glacial lake of Štrbské pleso (spelled with a lower-case p in Slovak) and the nearby small, man-made pond of Nové Štrbské pleso built in 1900. It has about 200 inhabitants.

== History ==
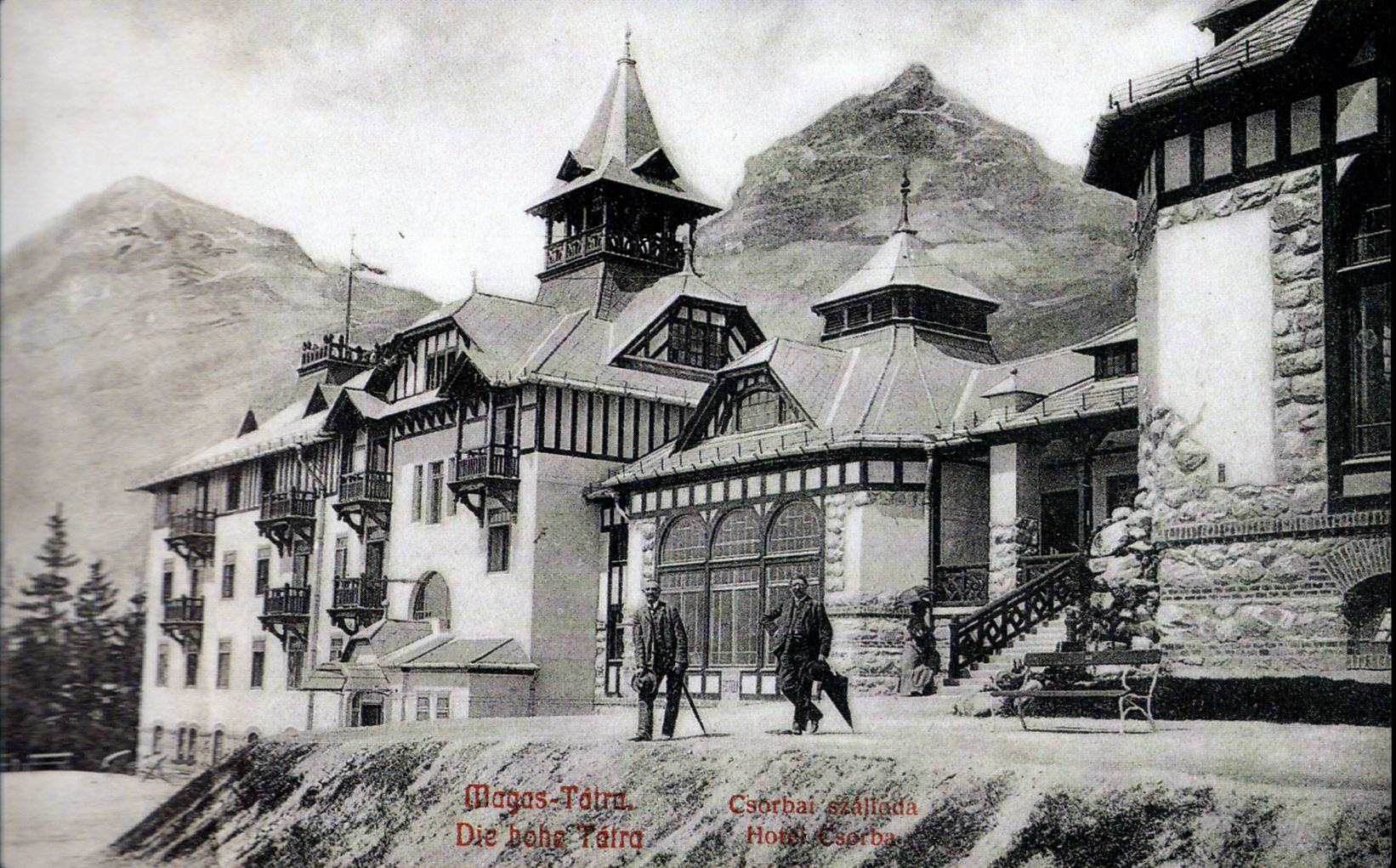
Grand Hotel Csorba

The future resort began to emerge in 1872 when Jozef Szentiványi ("of St. John". 1817–1906, from a noble family with roots in the nearby village of Liptovský Ján, originally: Sv. Ján, "St. John") built a hunting lodge on the banks of Štrbské pleso. Access to the High Tatras was made easier the year before when the railroad reached Poprad in their foothills. Szentiványi rented the lot from the village of Štrba whose municipal lands included the lake and which gave its name to it. He opened it to tourists a year later and allowed the Carpathian Union, a hiking society, to build its own Chalet Joseph nearby in 1875. The accommodation facilities that Szentiványi kept adding made it a popular destination. The rack railway connecting it to the main railroad was built in 1896. The first ski school was organized in 1899. The Tatra trolley linked it with other resorts on the Slovak side of the Tatras in 1912. The resort was acquired by the government in 1901.

The adjacent area of Nové Štrbské Pleso began to develop in 1897 when the land was purchased by the architect Karol Móry of Banská Bystrica. He dammed the Mlynica Brook in 1900 to flood a minor marsh, create the small "New Lake of Štrba", and enhance the charm of his property.

A treaty of alliance between the governments of Romania, Yugoslavia and Czechoslovakia was signed in Štrbské Pleso on 27 June 1930, that created a regular consultative structure for the Little Entente and registered in League of Nations Treaty Series on 3 October 1930.

Štrbské Pleso was considerably modernized in the 1970s, including the construction of several hotels, ski jumps etc. Another big reconstruction of almost all the hotels and sport areas took place in years 2007–2014 before the 2015 Winter Universiade

== Climate ==
Climate data for Štrbské Pleso: 1319m (1991−2020)
| Month | Jan | Feb | Mar | Apr | May | Jun | Jul | Aug | Sep | Oct | Nov | Dec | Year |
|---|---|---|---|---|---|---|---|---|---|---|---|---|---|
| Record high °C (°F) | 13.5 (56.3) | 12.2 (54.0) | 15.6 (60.1) | 23.2 (73.8) | 25.2 (77.4) | 28.4 (83.1) | 29.6 (85.3) | 29.9 (85.8) | 27.5 (81.5) | 23.4 (74.1) | 19.3 (66.7) | 13.3 (55.9) | 29.9 (85.8) |
| Mean daily maximum °C (°F) | −0.8 (30.6) | 0.0 (32.0) | 3.0 (37.4) | 8.9 (48.0) | 13.4 (56.1) | 17.1 (62.8) | 18.9 (66.0) | 19.2 (66.6) | 14.0 (57.2) | 9.2 (48.6) | 4.2 (39.6) | 0.2 (32.4) | 8.9 (48.0) |
| Daily mean °C (°F) | −4.9 (23.2) | −4.6 (23.7) | −2.0 (28.4) | 3.7 (38.7) | 8.6 (47.5) | 12.2 (54.0) | 13.8 (56.8) | 13.8 (56.8) | 9.0 (48.2) | 4.6 (40.3) | 0.3 (32.5) | −3.7 (25.3) | 4.2 (39.6) |
| Mean daily minimum °C (°F) | −8.3 (17.1) | −8.3 (17.1) | −5.5 (22.1) | −0.4 (31.3) | 4.4 (39.9) | 7.7 (45.9) | 9.5 (49.1) | 9.4 (48.9) | 5.1 (41.2) | 1.1 (34.0) | −2.4 (27.7) | −7.0 (19.4) | 0.4 (32.7) |
| Record low °C (°F) | −23.9 (−11.0) | −25.8 (−14.4) | −22.0 (−7.6) | −17.6 (0.3) | −8.0 (17.6) | −1.4 (29.5) | 0.0 (32.0) | −1.6 (29.1) | −5.3 (22.5) | −16.5 (2.3) | −18.0 (−0.4) | −22.5 (−8.5) | −25.8 (−14.4) |
| Average precipitation mm (inches) | 81.0 (3.19) | 68.1 (2.68) | 78.7 (3.10) | 73.4 (2.89) | 111.1 (4.37) | 120.8 (4.76) | 146.1 (5.75) | 110.2 (4.34) | 85.7 (3.37) | 82.6 (3.25) | 76.4 (3.01) | 72.8 (2.87) | 1,107 (43.58) |
| Average precipitation days (≥ 1.0 mm) | 12.0 | 11.4 | 12.4 | 11.3 | 14.1 | 13.1 | 14.5 | 10.8 | 10.1 | 10.6 | 11.1 | 12.5 | 143.9 |
| Average snowy days | 20.7 | 20.0 | 18.8 | 10.8 | 3.8 | 0.4 | 0.0 | 0.0 | 1.4 | 6.7 | 12.7 | 19.9 | 115.1 |
| Average relative humidity (%) | 80.9 | 79.8 | 76.3 | 72.3 | 74.0 | 76.5 | 74.7 | 75.7 | 80.4 | 82.2 | 83.7 | 83.2 | 78.3 |
Source: NOAA

== Transport ==
Train lines: 182, 183

== Tourism ==
With extensive parking facilities and a stop on the Tatra trolley and rack railway, it is a starting point for a host of popular hikes including to Kriváň and Rysy.

== Sports ==
=== Alpine skiing ===
ParkSnow Štrbské Pleso offers 7.5 kilometers of pistes, 3 chairlifts and 3 skilifts.

=== Ski jumping ===
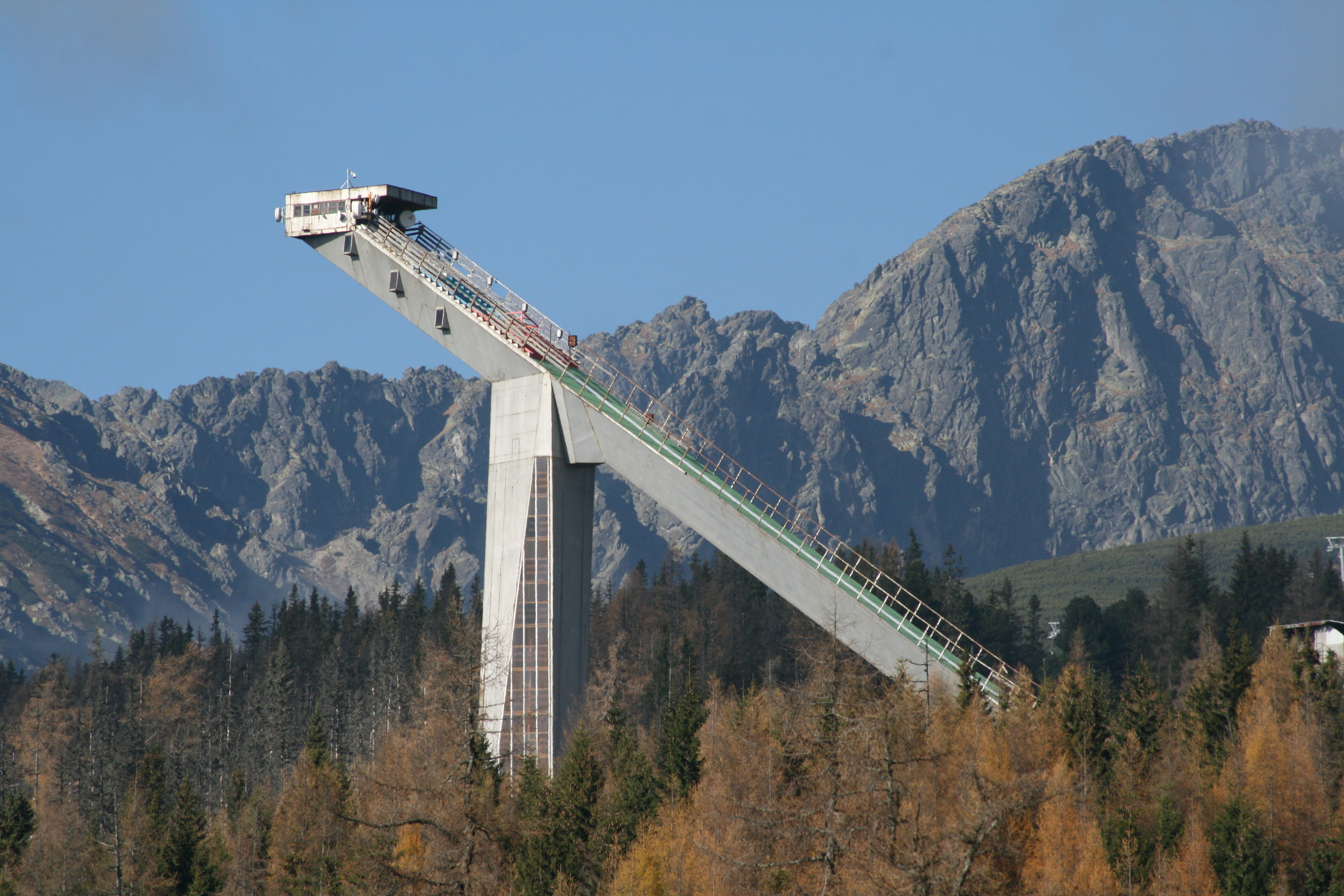
The ski jumping hill MS 1970

Štrbské Pleso had a FIS Ski Jumping World Cup competition every year from 1980 to 1987 and also in 1991. The Junior World Championships were held in 1990, 2000 and 2009. The complex, named MS 1970 has a 90-metre hill and 120 metre hill. 120 metre hill is not in use for its purpose however. Landing hill was last used for competition in freestyle skiing in 2003.

=== Multi-sports events ===
Štrbské Pleso hosted the cross country skiing, Nordic combined and ski jumping events of the 1987 and 2015 Winter Universiade.

== Transport ==
Štrbské Pleso can be reached from Štrba on the Štrbské Pleso–Štrba rack railway, from Poprad on the Tatra Electric Railway or by road. Štrba is a short 16-km drive west from Poprad. There is an international airport in Poprad.
