= Tereza Medveďová =

Slovak cyclist (born 1996)

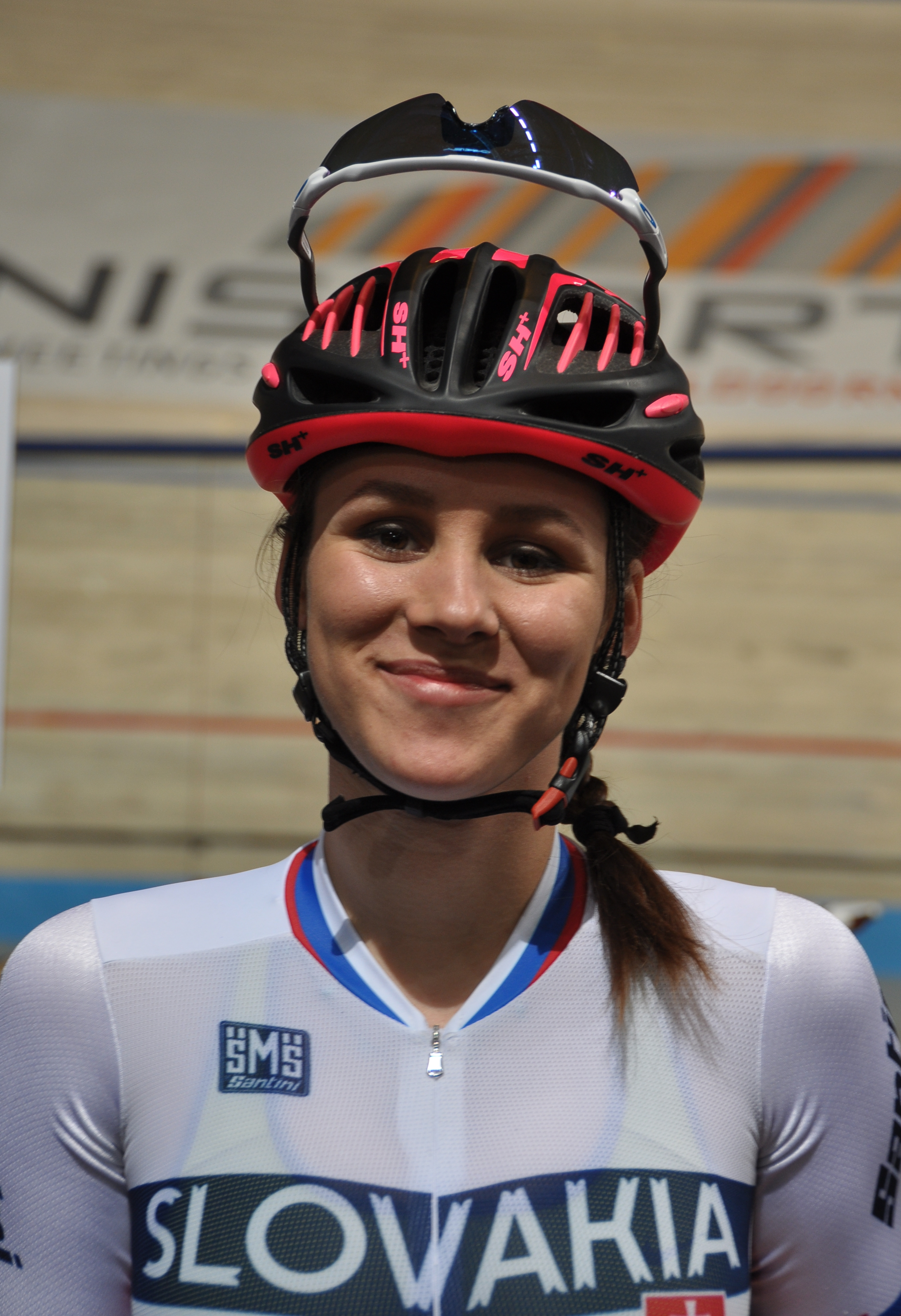
- Medveďová in 2018

Personal information
- Full name: Tereza Medveďová
- Born: 27 March 1996 (age 30) Brezno, Slovakia

Cycling career
- Sport: Cycling
- Disciplines: Road; Track
- Role: Rider

Professional teams
- 2015–2019: BePink–La Classica
- 2020–2021: WCC Team

Tereza Medveďová (born 27 March 1996) is a Slovak professional racing cyclist, who most recently rode for UCI Women's Continental Team WCC Team.

== Early life ==
Medveďová was born on 27 March 1996, in the city of Brezno in Slovakia.

== Career ==
Medveďová achieved her first elite successes in cyclocross. She became Slovak champion in this discipline in 2010, 2011, 2013, and 2014. In road cycling, she won both Slovak junior titles in the road race and individual time trial in 2011. She athlete was hailed as the country's "greatest cycling discovery" and dubbed "Sagan in a skirt.".

At the 2013 UCI Road World Championships, Medveďová finished sixth in the junior women's road race. In 2013 and 2014, she won the national junior titles in the individual time trial, and in 2015 she became the elite time trial champion and runner-up in the road race.

In 2018, Medveďová was nominated as a reserve rider for the omnium at the Track Cycling World Championships in Apeldoorn, but did not compete, and she became the Czech national road race champion. In 2020 she won both national road cycling titles, and in 2018, 2019 and 2020 the titles in the 500-meter time trial and individual pursuit on the track. In 2021 she became Slovak road cycling champion again.

== Major results ==
=== Cyclo-cross ===
2009
1st Horná Mičiná Cyclo-cross #1
1st Borová Cyclo-cross
1st Banská Bystrica Cyclo-cross
1st Hlinsko Cyclo-cross
2nd Plzeň Cyclo-cross
2nd Zelenec Cyclo-cross
2nd Holé Vrchy Cyclo-cross
2nd Trnava Cyclo-cross
2nd Vrícko Cyclo-cross
2010
1st National Cyclo-cross Championships
1st Overall Slovenský Pohár Cyclo-cross

1st Borová
1st Zelenec
1st Trnava
2nd Horná Mičiná
2nd Raková
2nd Petržalka
2nd Kremnica

1st Louny Cyclo-cross
1st Uničov Cyclo-cross
1st Plzeň Cyclo-cross
1st Kolín Cyclo-cross
2nd Stříbro Cyclo-cross
2011
1st National Cyclo-cross Championships
1st Overall Slovenský Pohár Cyclo-cross

1st Horná Mičiná
1st Bratislava
1st Miezgovce
1st Spišská Nová Ves #1
1st Spišská Nová Ves #2
1st Krupina
1st Trenčín
1st Trnava
2nd Borová
2nd Raková

1st Loštice Cyclo-cross
2nd Stříbro Cyclo-cross
2nd Mnichovo Hradiště Cyclo-cross
3rd Louny Cyclo-cross
2012
1st Overall Slovenský Pohár Cyclo-cross

1st Prosné #1
1st Prosné #2
1st Horná Mičiná #1
1st Borová
1st Bánovce nad Bebravou
1st Trenčín
1st Trnava #1
2nd Dubnica nad Váhom

2nd National Cyclo-cross Championships
3rd Kolín Cyclo-cross
2013
1st National Cyclo-cross Championships
1st Overall Slovenský Pohár Cyclo-cross

1st Prosné #1
1st Svit
1st Levoča
1st Bratislava #1
1st Horná Mičiná #1
1st Stará Ľubovňa
1st Trnava #1
1st Krupina
2nd Prosné #2

2014
1st National Cyclo-cross Championships
1st Overall Slovenský Pohár Cyclo-cross

1st Raková
1st Ružomberok
2nd Levoča
2nd Spišská Sobota

2015
1st Levoča Cyclo-cross
1st Spišská Sobota
1st Ružomberok Cyclo-cross
2016
1st Bánovce nad Bebravou Cyclo-cross
1st Terchová Cyclo-cross
1st Levoča Cyclo-cross
1st Horná Mičiná #1
2017
2nd National Cyclo-cross Championships
3rd Overall Slovenský Pohár

=== Road ===
2011
National Novices Road Championships

1st Road race
1st Time trial

2013
1st Time trial, National Junior Road Championships
6th Road race, UCI Junior Road World Championships
2014
National Junior Road Championships

1st Time trial
1st Road race

2015
National Road Championships

1st Time trial
2nd Road race

2016
National Road Championships

3rd Road race
4th Time trial

6th Overall Tour de Bretagne Féminin
2017
National Road Championships

3rd Time trial
3rd Road race

2018
National Road Championships

1st Road race
4th Time trial

9th Road race, UCI Road World Championships
2019
2nd Road race, National Road Championships
2020
National Road Championships

1st Road race
1st Time trial

2021
National Road Championships

1st Road race
6th Time trial

2022
3rd Road race, National Road Championships

=== Track ===
2018
National Track Championships

1st 500m time trial
1st Individual pursuit
2nd Scratch
3rd Omnium

2019
National Track Championships

1st 500m time trial
1st Individual pursuit
2nd Scratch
2nd Points race
2nd Omnium

2020
National Track Championships

1st 500m time trial
1st Individual pursuit
3rd Elimination race
