= Bratislava Transport Museum =

Transport museum in Slovakia

Coordinates: 48°09′23″N 17°06′22″E

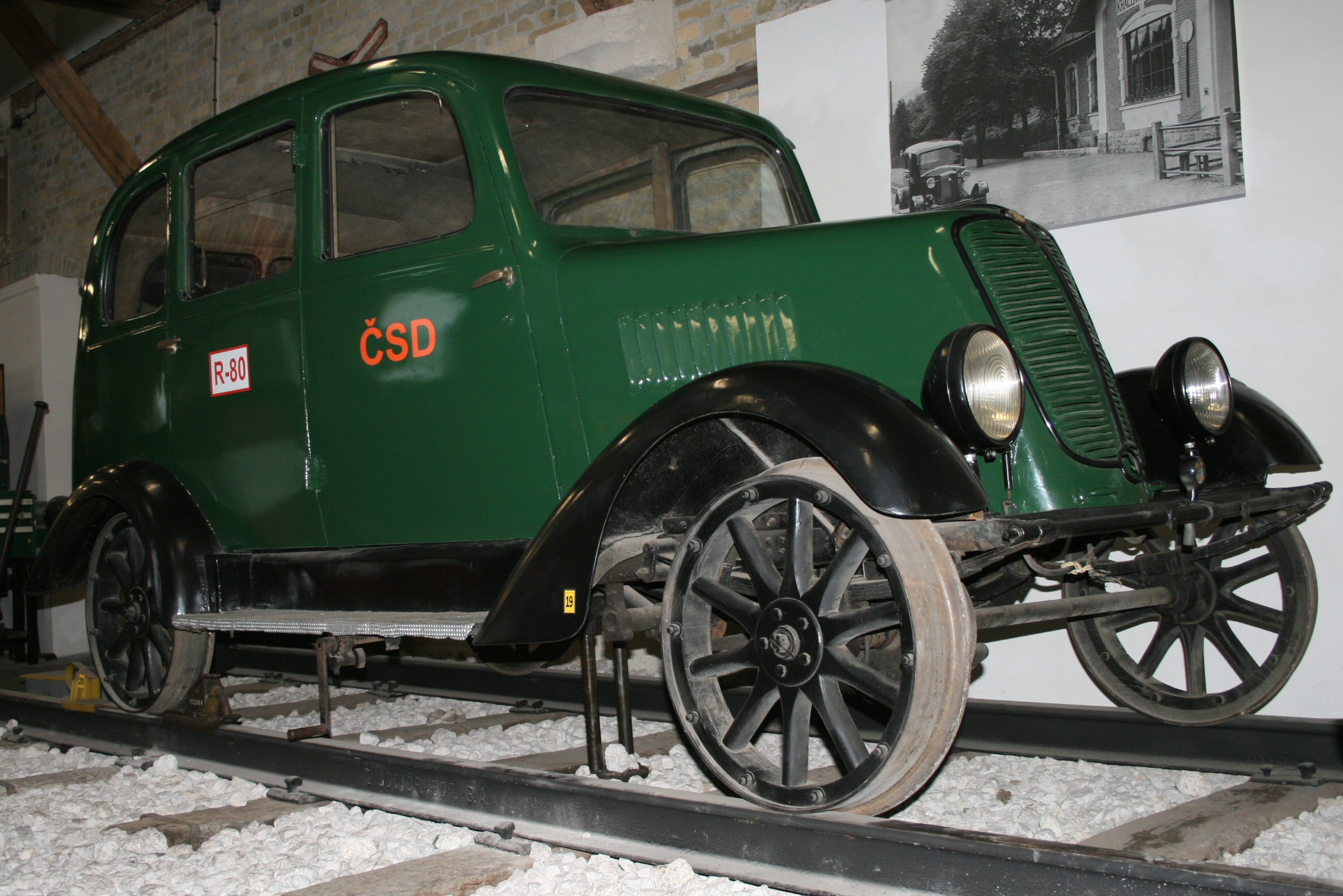
A Tatra 15 vehicle at the museum

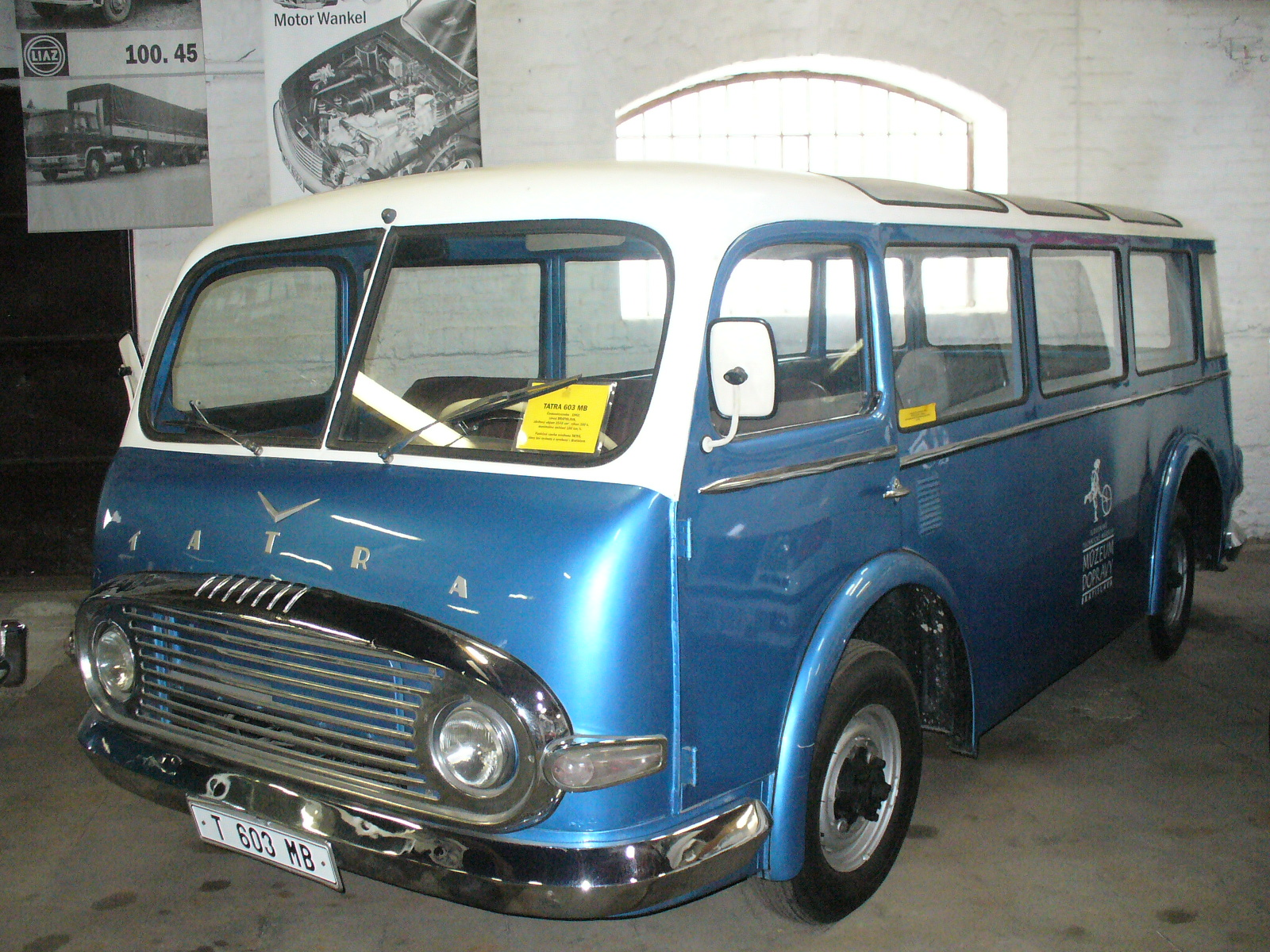
A Tatra 603 vehicle at the museum

Bratislava Transport Museum (Múzeum dopravy Bratislava) is a transport museum in Bratislava, Slovakia. It is a branch of the Slovak Technical Museum in Košice, is situated on the site of the first steam-railway station in Bratislava on Šancová Street, near the current main railway station in central Bratislava. It opened on June 24, 1999.

== Collections and exhibits ==
The two exhibition halls of the museum include just under 100 motorcars, 25 historical motorcycles and numerous technical accessories.

Vehicles in the collection date from the inter-war period up to the 1970s. These include prototypes, military and government vehicles. Most of the vehicles in the collection were manufactured in what is now Slovakia.

On the museum's railway tracks various steam and electrical locomotives are exhibited.

Vienna Tramway

In October 2024 a one-year exhibition on the socalled "Vienna Tramway", existing in 1914, started. The exhibition is planned to be open to the public until November 2025. The standard gauge train line was an innovative electric railway link between Vienna and Bratislava in times when most locomotives were driven by steam engines. The railway connection was highly popular, with around 3 million travellers in the first year of itś establishment.

== See also ==
- Museum of Aviation, Košice - The other major transport museum branch of the Slovak Technical Museum.
- List of museums in Slovakia
- List of transport museums in Slovakia
