= Museum of Aviation =

Museum of Aviation may refer to:

- Camden Museum of Aviation, Australia
- Museum of Aviation (Belgrade), Serbia
- Museum of Aviation (Košice), Slovakia
- Museum of Aviation (Warner Robins), Georgia, United States

== See also ==
- List of aviation museums
