= Ján Palárik =

Slovak Catholic priest, writer, playwright and publicist (1822–1870)

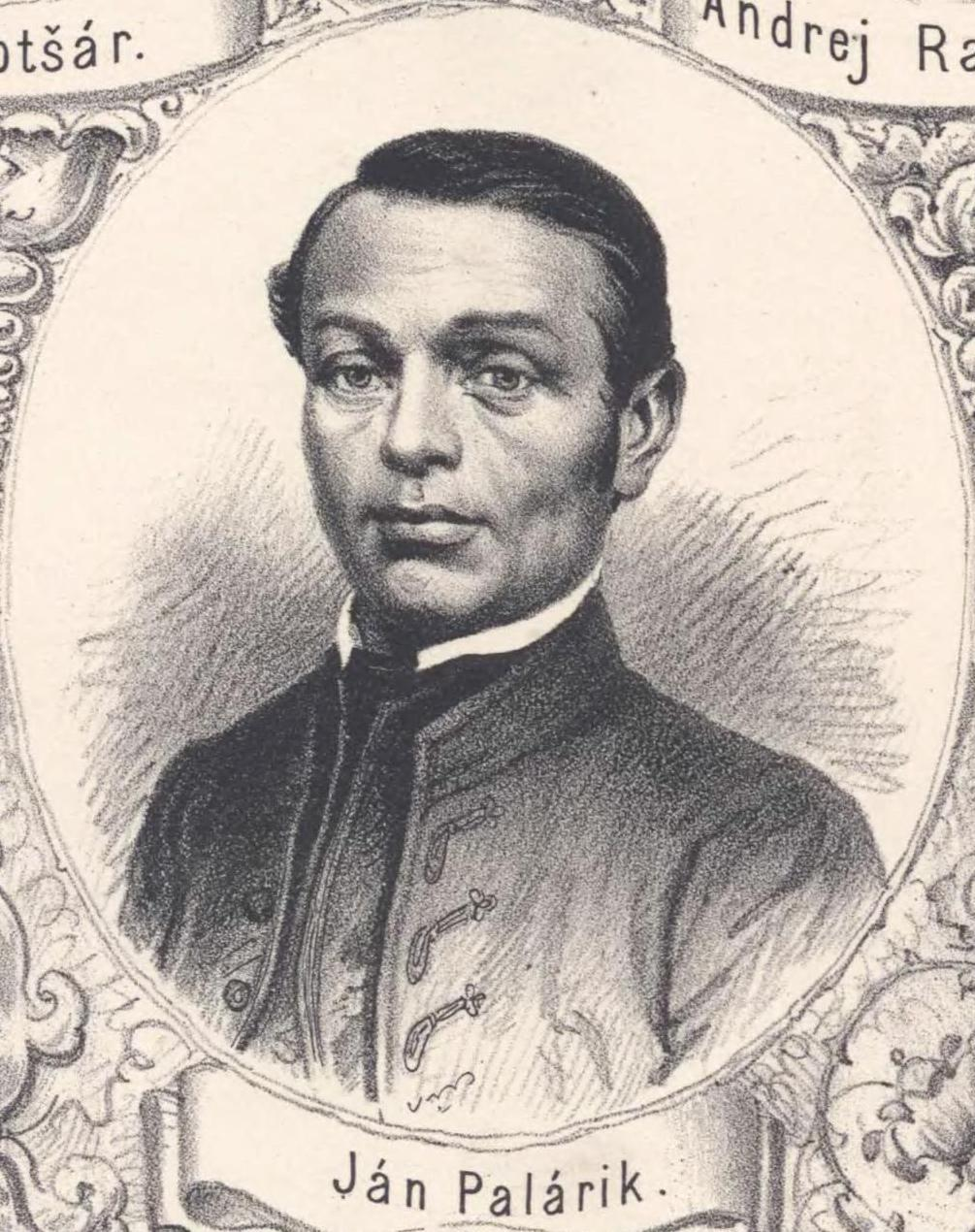
- Born: 27 April 1822; Raková, Austrian Empire
- Died: 7 December 1870 (aged 48); Majcichov, Austria-Hungary
- Occupations: Writer, Catholic priest, journalist
- Known for: Slovak nationalism writings

Ján Palárik (27 April 1822 – 7 December 1870) was a Slovak playwright, Catholic priest, and opinion journalist. He wrote in favor of Slovak nationalism and liberal government policies. Along with Ján Chalupka and Jonáš Záborský, he is one of the most important representatives of Slovak drama of the 19th century.

He spent most of his adult life as a parish priest while also working as a journalist and editor of Catholic and Slovak-language periodicals. In 1863 he became a co-founding member of Matica slovenská, the Slovak national cultural institution, and he remained active in Slovak cultural and civic organizing until his death.

== Early life and education ==
Ján Palárik was born on 27 April 1822 in Raková in what was then the Austrian Empire, the son of a local teacher and organist, Šimon Palárik, who gave him his first schooling in classical languages and music. He continued his studies at the gymnasium in Žilina and, against his father's wishes, at the gymnasium in Kecskemét in Hungary, where he also became fluent in Hungarian.

In 1839 he attended seminary school in Esztergom, and later received a scientific education in Bratislava and Tyrnau during which he studied Slavic literature. In Trnava he became part of a circle of nationally conscious, progressive seminarians that included the linguist Martin Hattala, Jozef Viktorin, and Count Rudolf Ňáry. He was fluent in Latin, Greek, Hungarian, German, Russian, Polish, and French.

== Church service ==
In 1847 he was ordained as a priest of the Esztergom Diocese after which he then experienced the Hungarian Revolution of 1848

Later in 1850 he published the journal "Cyril a Method" where he criticized the organization and views of the Catholic church. This angered the Hungarian church journal "Religio", leading to Palárik being put on trial for heresy, and after refusing to renounce his views on Slovak nationalism he was arrested and stripped of his religious title.

== Playwright career ==
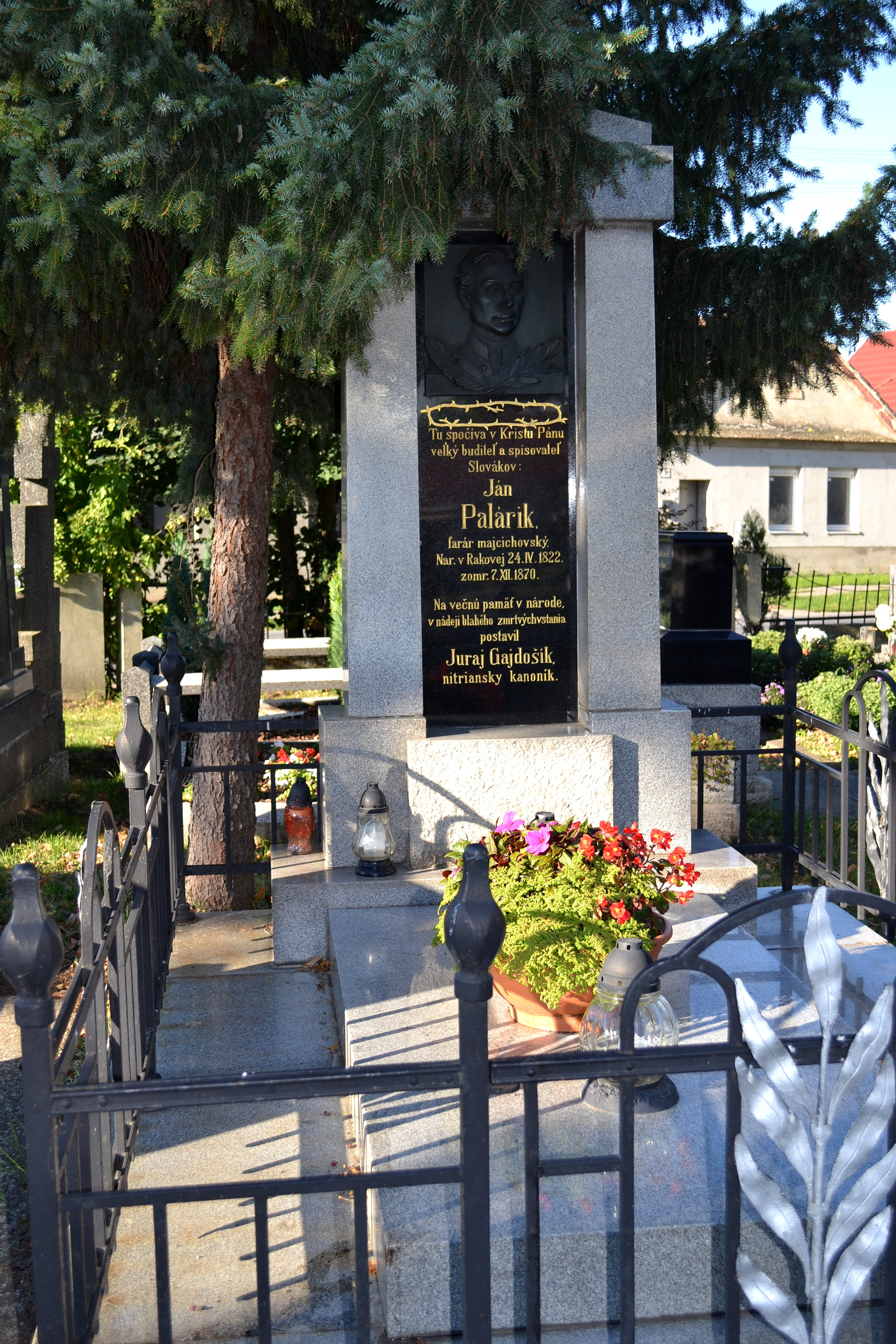
Tomb of Ján Palárik

After being removed from the church, Palárik began writing as a dramatic author as a form of public protest. His plays continued to criticize the then Hungarian government and the Catholic church while advocating for a Slovak liberal state. Plays written by him incluse Incogniteo (1858), Drotár (1860), and Zmírenie oder Dobrodružstvo pri obžinkoch (1862).

== Places named in honor of Palárik ==
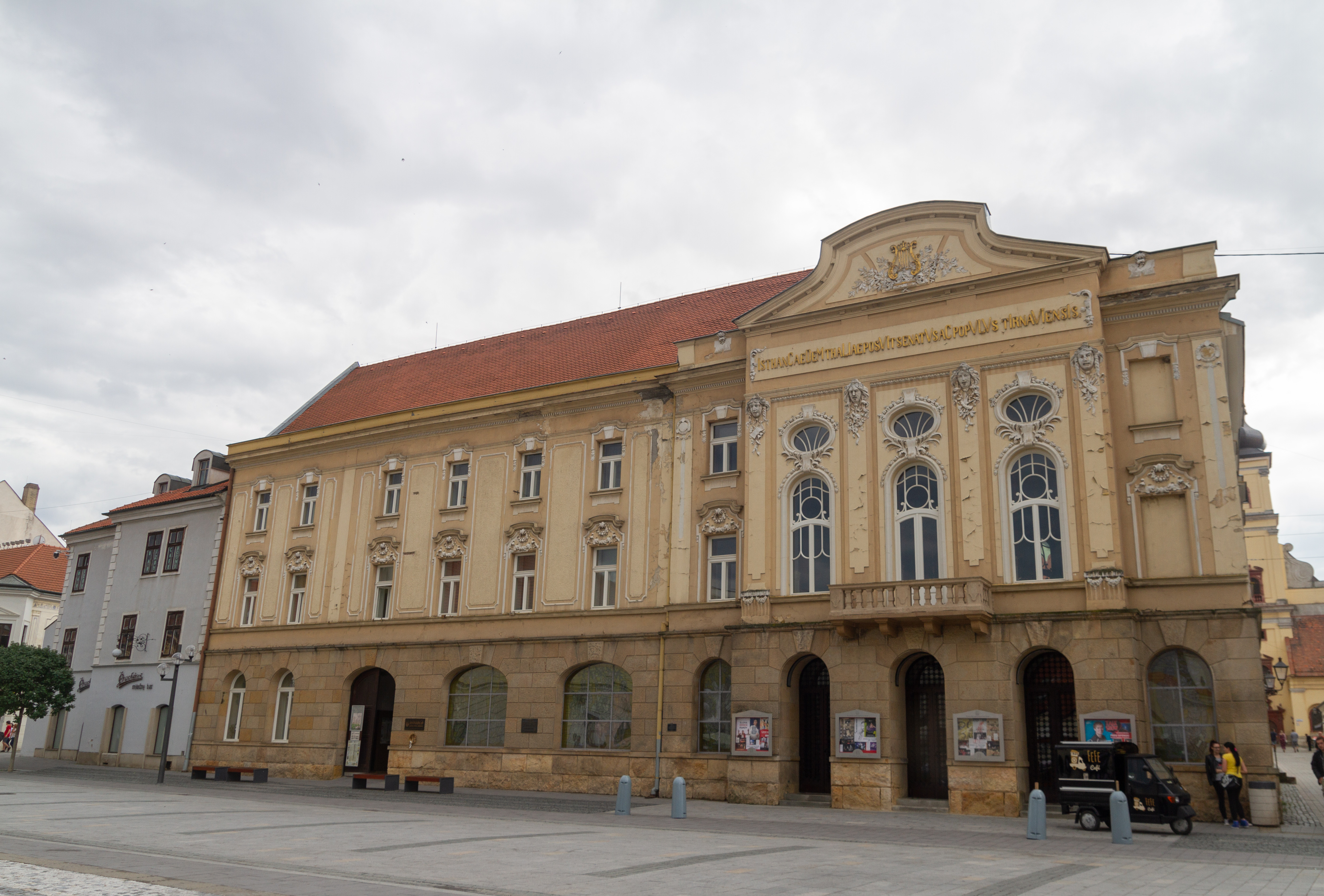
Palárik Theater, Trnava

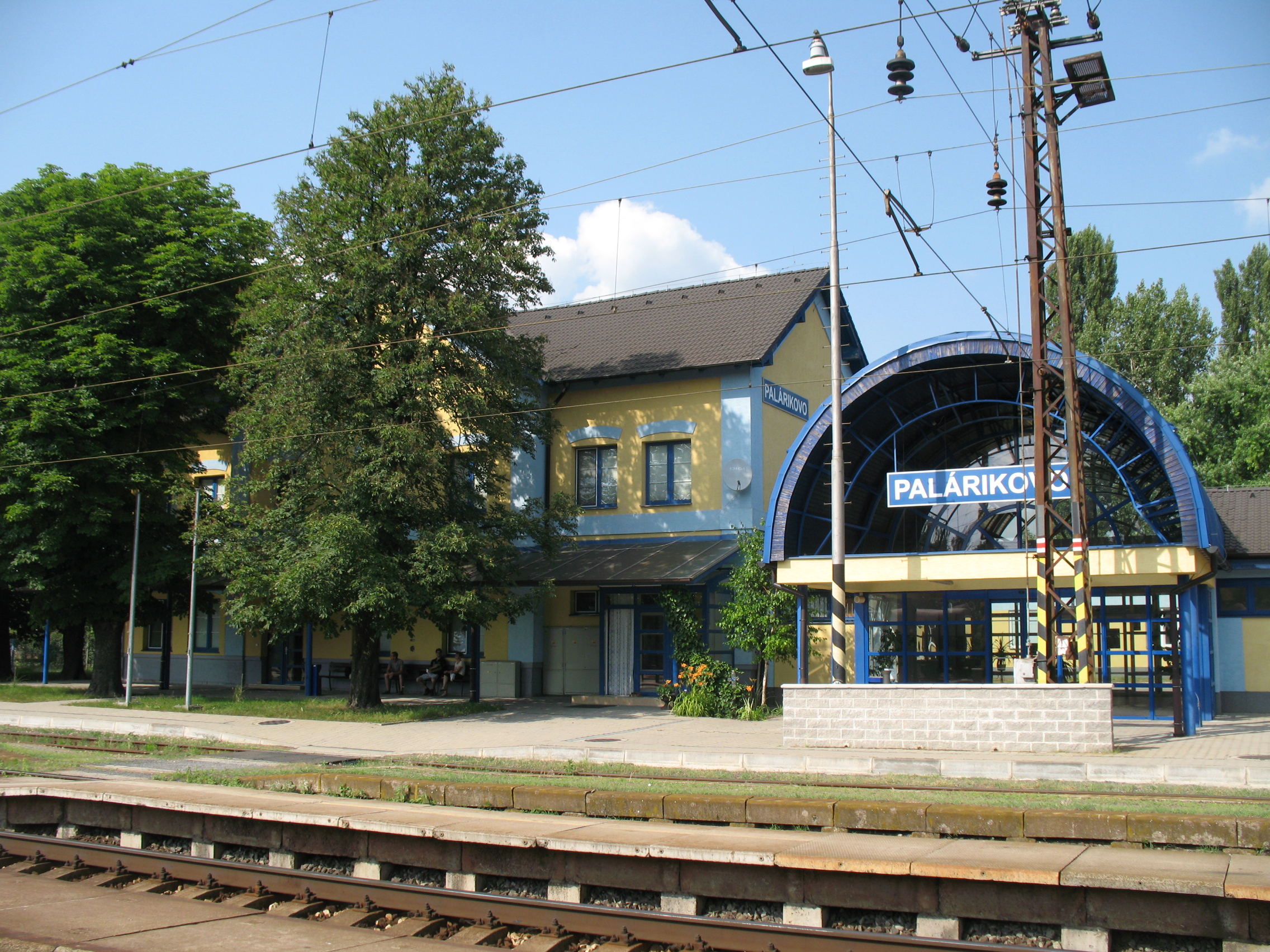
Town of Palárikovo

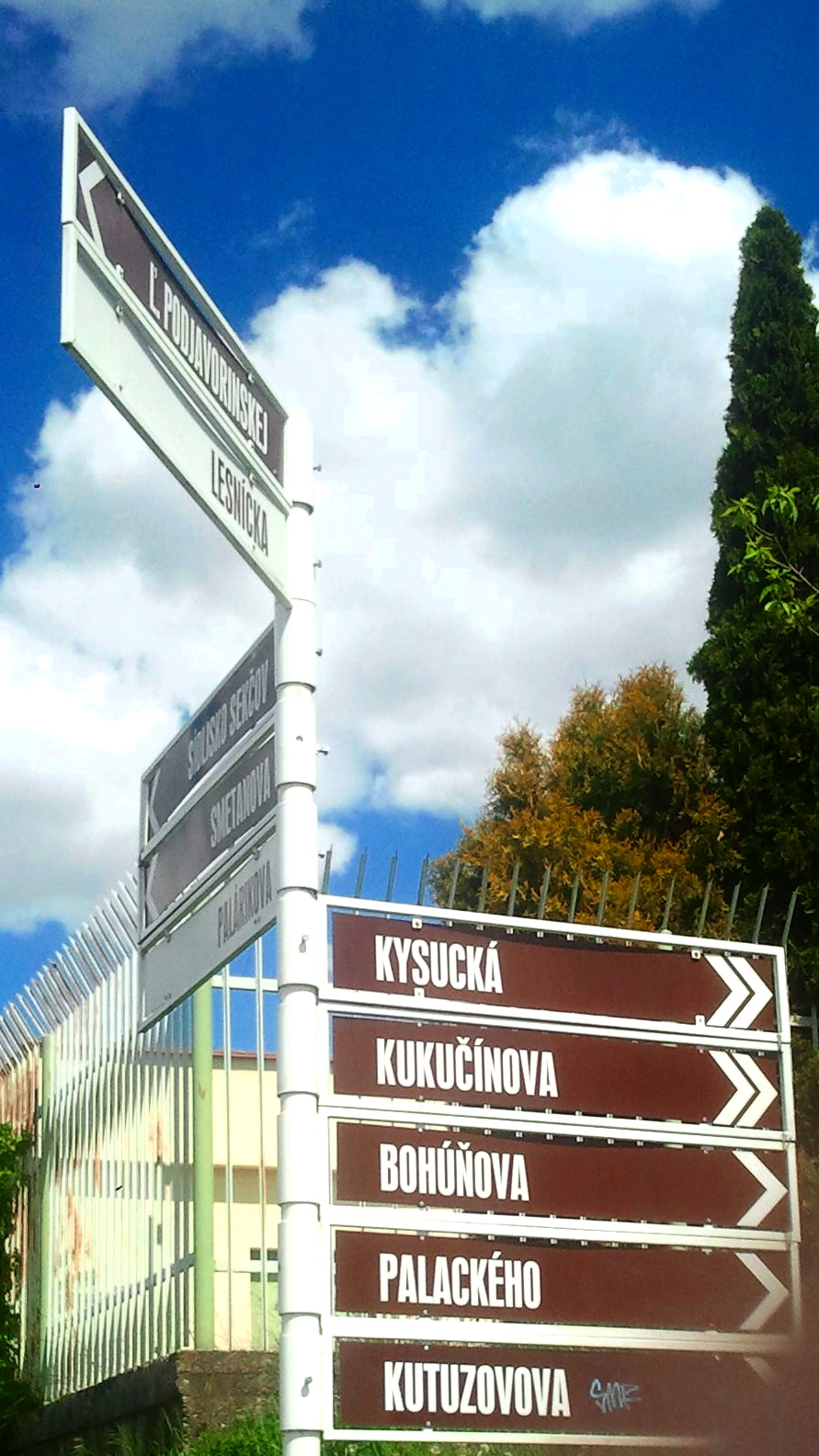
Palárikova street, Prešov
