= Trnavské mýto =

Transport junction in Bratislava, Slovakia

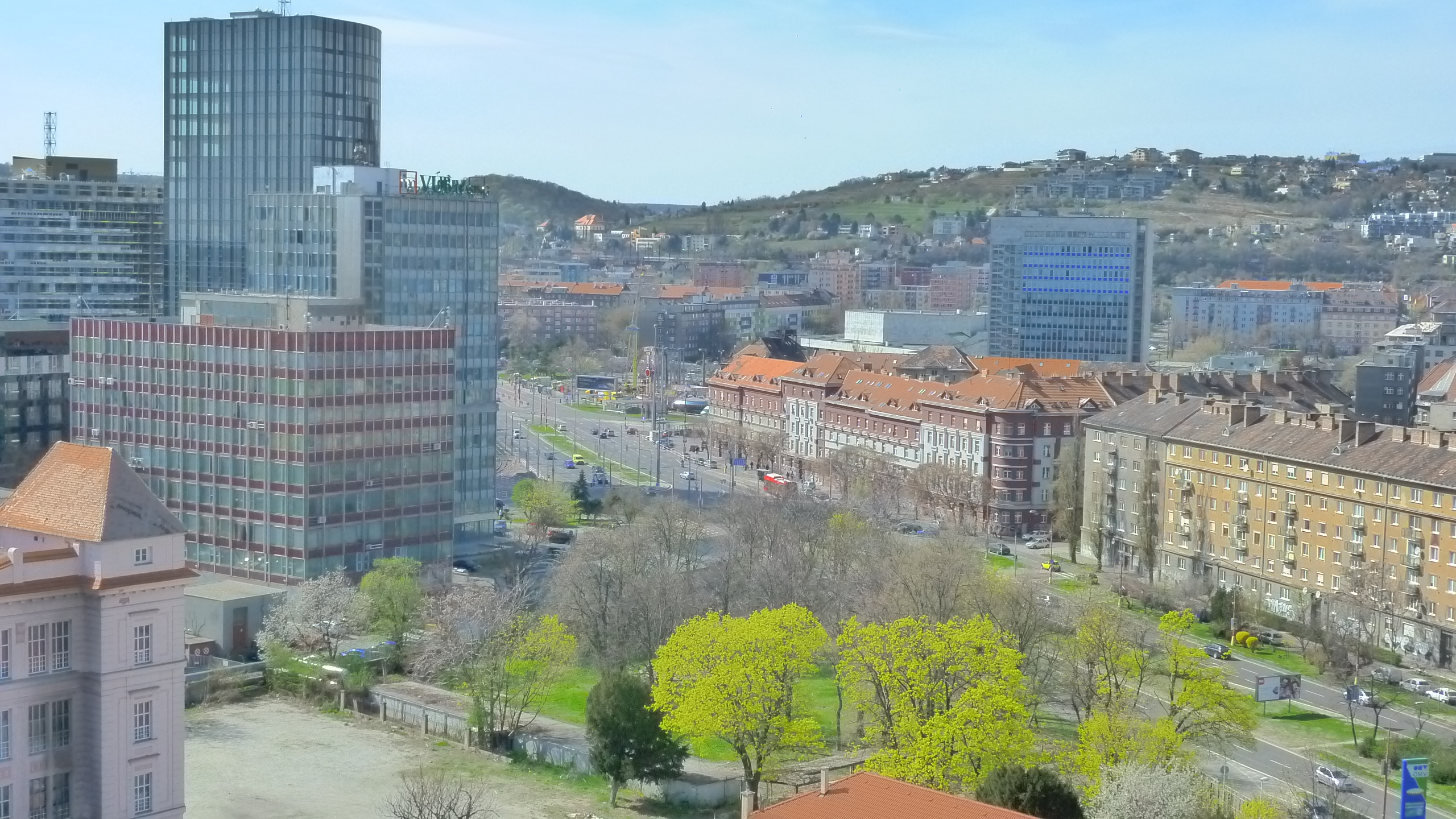
Trnavské mýto

Trnavské mýto is an important transport junction and crossroad in Bratislava, Slovakia, in the Nové Mesto district. It is located at 48°9′30″N 17°07′41″E.

== Description ==
The area includes a square, home to Dom odborov Istropolis on the north side and a market hall (tržnica) on the south. In addition to the streets listed below, Trnavské mýto is crossed by tram lines from the city center heading both northeast on Vajnorská toward Vajnory and east via Miletičova toward Ružinov, as well as trolleybus lines from the east and west and bus service in all directions.

A pedestrian subway (Slovak: podchod) links the corners of the intersection with the tram stops, and includes several small shops.

== History ==
Trnavské mýto takes its name from its situation on the road connecting Bratislava to Trnava ("Trnavská") and from the toll point ("mýto"), though no tolls are collected there.

Formerly, a large marketplace was located here, but this was later moved to Miletičova ulica.

- 1783: Marketplace
- 1820: Cattle market, pub
- 1973: Construction of the Dom odborov office tower
- 1975: Underpass constructed; marketplace relocated
- 1981: Construction of Istropolis cultural centre

== Connecting streets ==
- Šancová Street to the west, toward Račianske mýto
- Trnavská cesta to the east, toward Trnava
- Vajnorská Street to the northeast, toward Vajnory
- Krížna Street to the southwest, toward the Old Town

== Sources ==
Monografia mestskej časti Bratislava-Nové Mesto (in Slovak). Bratislava: Miestny úrad Bratislava-Nové Mesto. 1998. ISBN 80-967854-4-3.
