= Palárikovo =

Palárikovo Tótmegyer
- Municipality
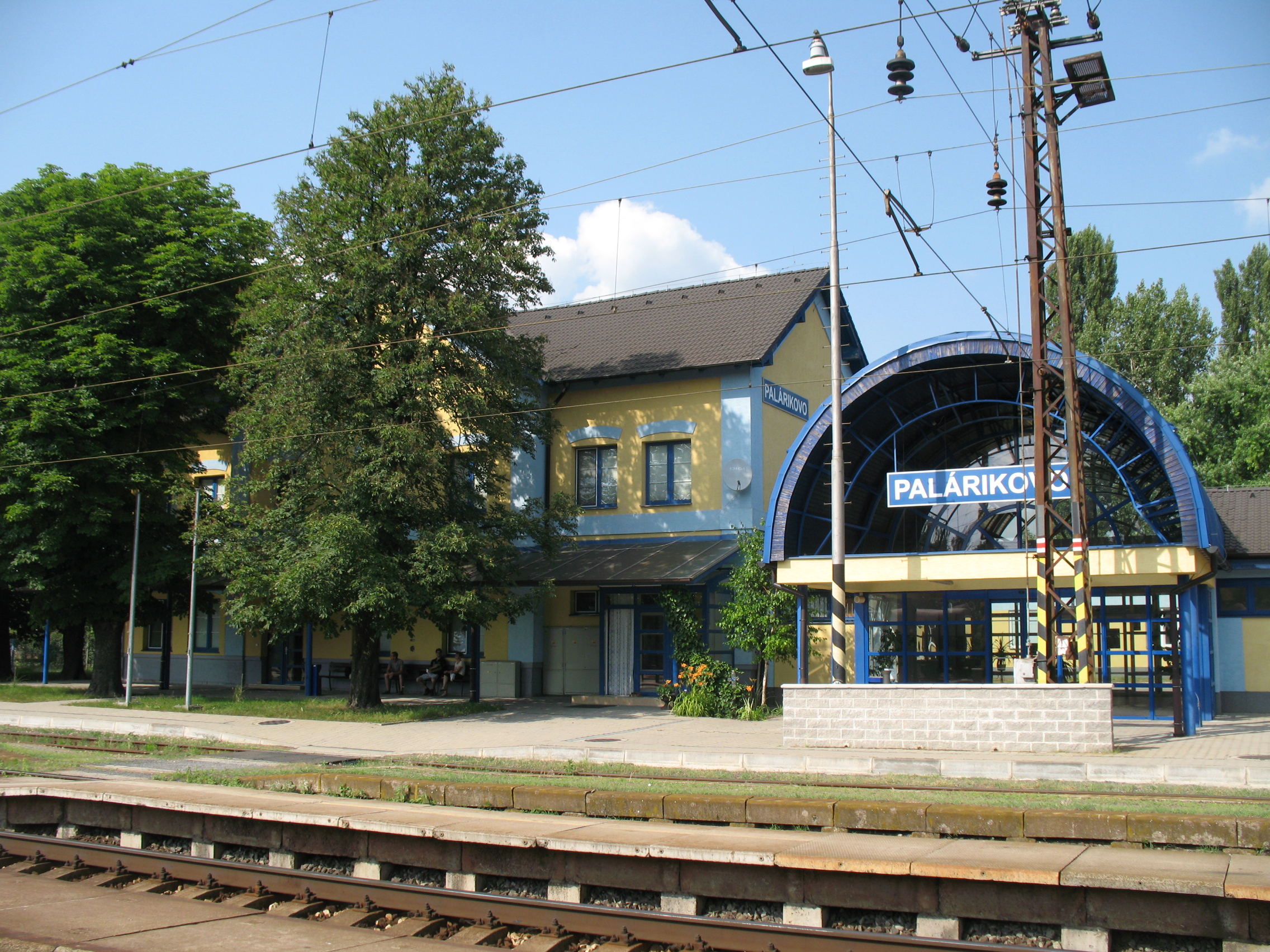
- Palárikovo Station

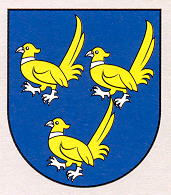
- Flag Coat of arms

- Location of Palárikovo in the Nitra Region Location of Palárikovo in Slovakia
- Coordinates: 48.05°N 18.07°E
- Country: Slovakia
- Region: Nitra Region
- District: Nové Zámky District
- First mentioned: 1221

Area
  - Total: 51.29 km^{2} (19.80 sq mi)
- Elevation: 117 m (384 ft)

Population (2025)
  - Total: 4,197
- Time zone: UTC+1 (CET)
  - Summer (DST): UTC+2 (CEST)
- Postal code: 941 11
- Area code: +421 35
- Vehicle registration plate (until 2022): NZ
- Website: www.obecpalarikovo.sk

Palárikovo (Hungarian: Tótmegyer) is a large village and municipality in the Nové Zámky District in the Nitra Region of south-west Slovakia.

== Names and etymology ==
The village is named after a Slovak playwright Ján Palárik. The historic Slovak name Slovenský Meder was semantically the same as the Hungarian name Tótmegyer. Slovenský/Tót — Slovak, Meder/Megyer - the old Magyar tribe whose members lived in the region as garrison units.

== History ==
In historical records the village was first mentioned in 1248.

== Geography ==
The municipality lies at an altitude of 117 metres (384 ft) and covers an area of 51.29 km^{2} (19.80 sq mi) (2025).

== Population ==
Population statistic (10 years)
Year	1995	2005	2015	2025
Count	4384	4426	4278	4197
Difference		+0.95%	−3.34%	−1.89%

Population statistic
Year	2024	2025
Count	4203	4197
Difference		−0.14%

It has a population of 4197 people (31 December 2025).

=== Ethnicity ===
Census 2021 (1+ %)
Ethnicity	Number	Fraction
Slovak	3815	89.3%
Not found out	382	8.94%
Hungarian	86	2.01%
Total	4272	

In year 2021 was 4272 people by ethnicity 3815 as Slovak, 382 as Not found out, 86 as Hungarian, 27 as Czech, 25 as Romani, 11 as Russian, 11 as Other, 5 as Rusyn, 3 as English, 2 as Vietnamese, 2 as Italian, 2 as Austrian, 2 as Moravian, 1 as Ukrainian, 1 as Turkish, 1 as Polish, 1 as German and 1 as Bulgarian.

Note on population: The difference values of population numbers in the table "Population statistic" and in the sections "Ethnicity" & "Religion" is caused by the use of various statistical methods.

=== Religion ===
Census 2021 (1+ %)
Religion	Number	Fraction
Roman Catholic Church	2573	60.23%
None	1164	27.25%
Not found out	368	8.61%
Evangelical Church	54	1.26%
Total	4272	

In year 2021 was 4272 people by religion 2573 from Roman Catholic Church, 1164 from None, 368 from Not found out, 54 from Evangelical Church, 23 from Greek Catholic Church, 19 from Christian Congregations in Slovakia, 14 from Ad hoc movements, 11 from Calvinist Church, 11 from Eastern Orthodox Church, 11 from Other, 5 from Paganism and natural spirituality, 5 from Buddhism, 5 from Apostolic Church, 4 from Other and not ascertained christian church, 2 from United Methodist Church, 1 from Old Catholic Church, 1 from Islam and 1 from Bahá'i Community.

== Facilities ==
The village has a small public library, a DVD rental store and cinema. It also has a gym and a football pitch.

== Twin towns — sister cities ==
Palárikovo is twinned with:

- Zubří, Czech Republic
