= Slovak Technical Museum =

Museum in Košice, Slovakia

Coordinates: 48°43′27″N 21°15′21″E

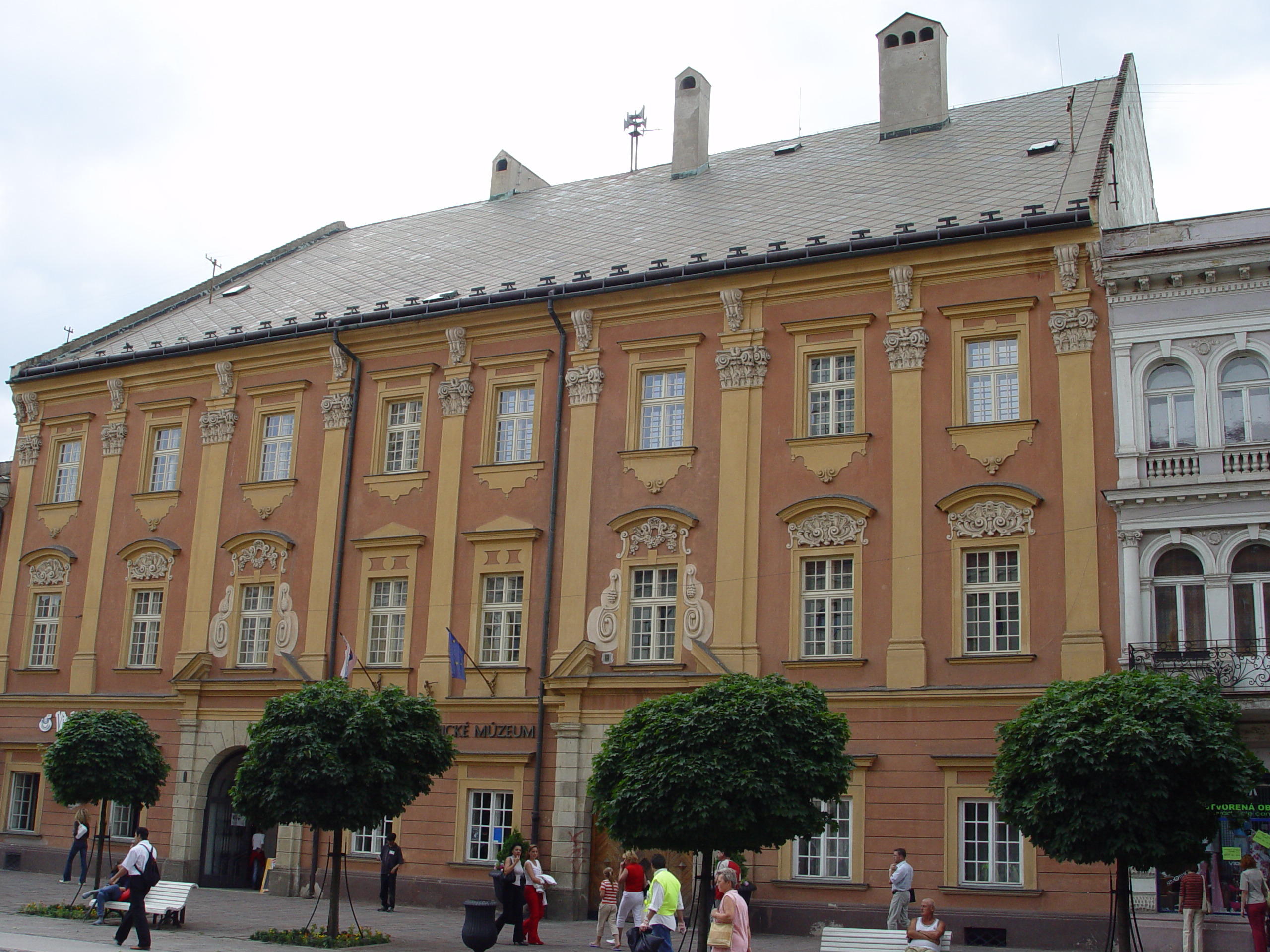
The central STM museum in the Captain Palace on the Main Street in Košice.

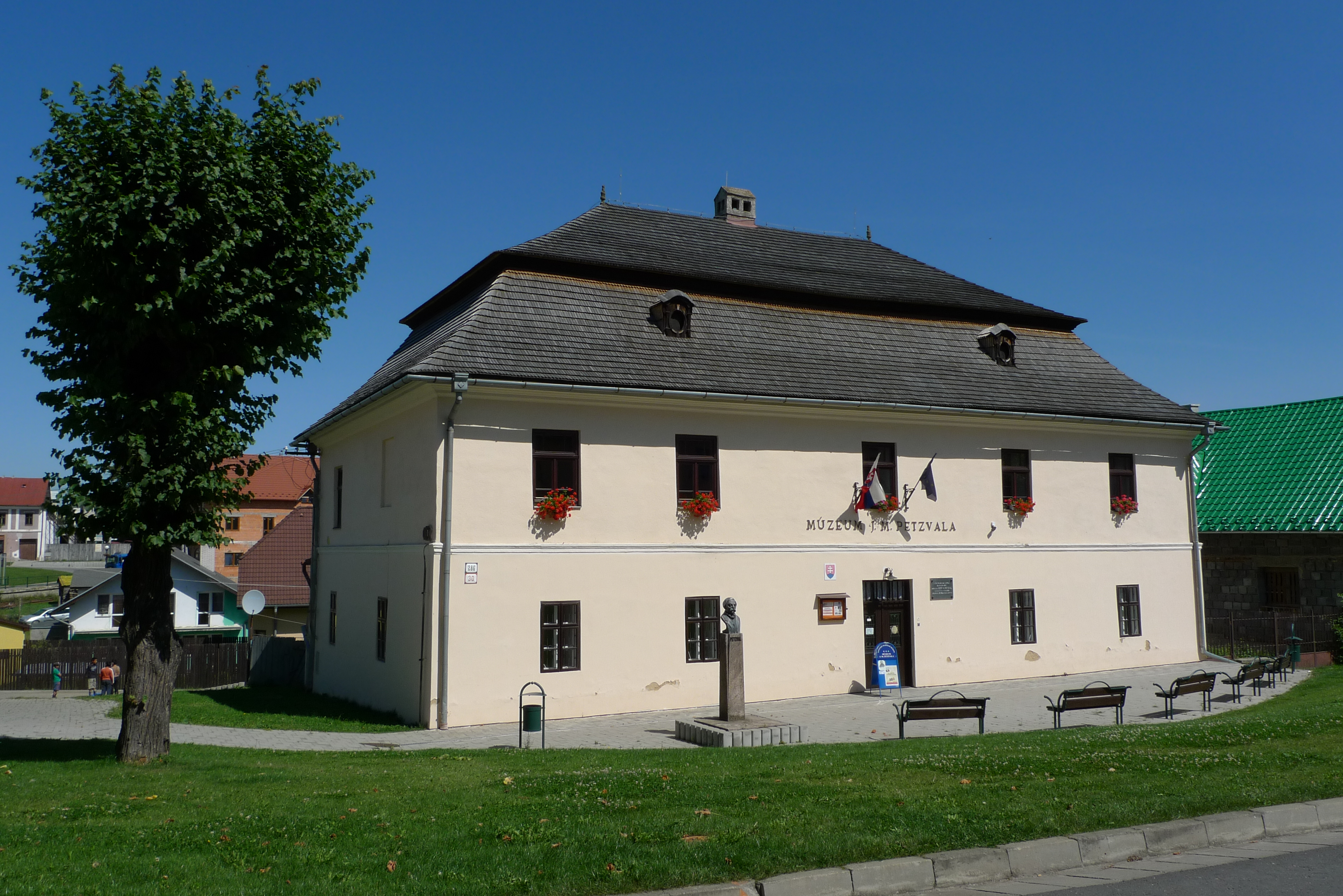
Museum of J.M. Petzval in Spišská Belá.

The Slovak Technical Museum (Slovak: Slovenské technické múzeum, STM) is a major Slovak technology museum, based in the eastern Slovak city of Košice, with branches throughout Slovakia. It was established in 1947 and opened to the public in 1948, under the name Technical Museum (Technické múzeum). The museum was renamed to its current name in 1983. Its main exhibits and headquarters are located in the northern part of Košice's Main Street (Hlavná ulica), in the historical public building known as Kapitánsky palác (The Captain Palace).

== Museums ==
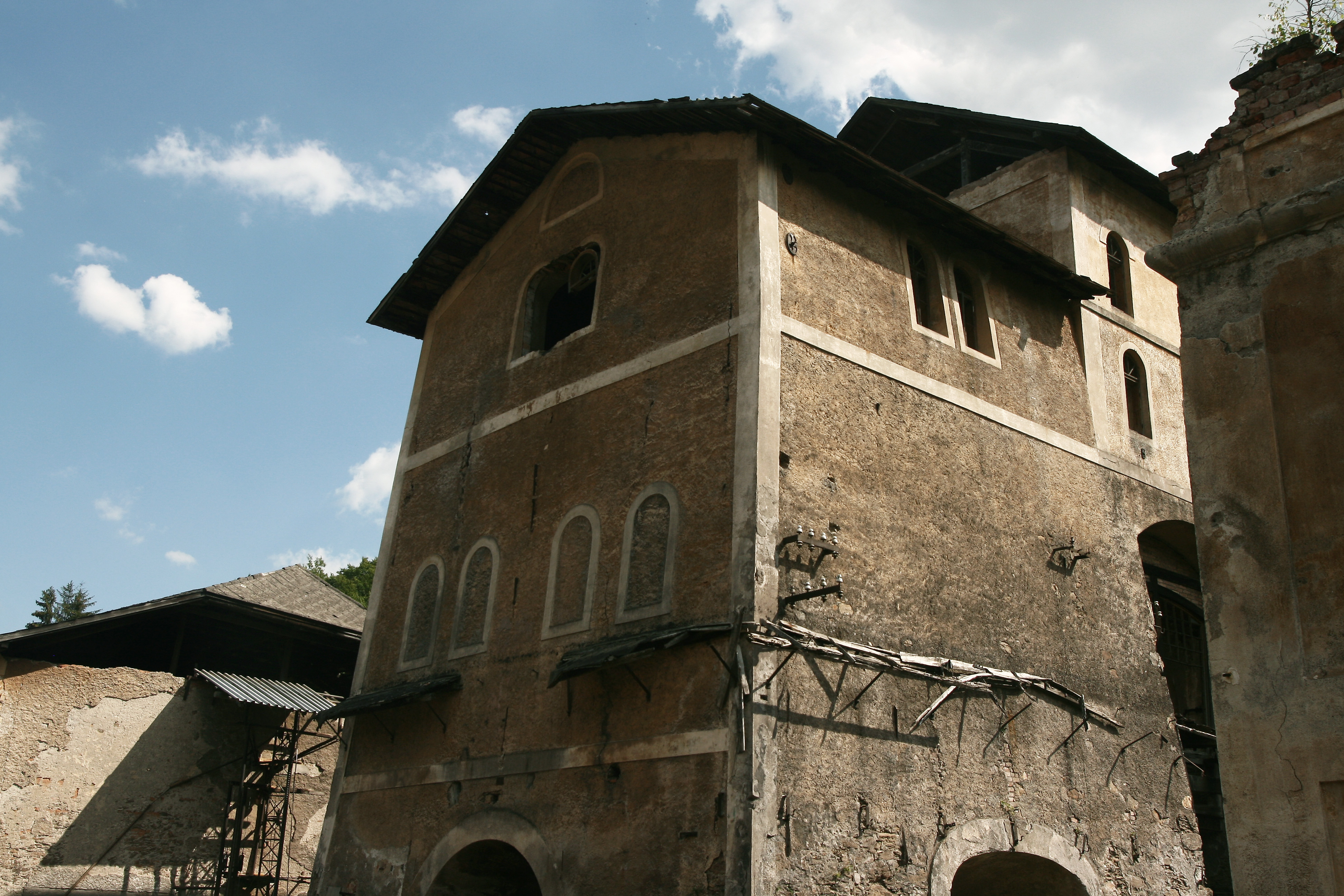
Blast furnace 'Karol' in Vlachovo

The main museum in Košice's historical centre has collections and exhibits that focus on the history of industrial and technological topics such as mining, metallurgy, artistic crafts, physics, chemistry, steam engines, electrical engineering, energy production, typewriters, phonographs and other sound recording devices, telephones, radiotelegraphy and radios. The museum also includes a planetarium and exhibits related to astronomy and space research.

The museum's branches throughout Slovakia are as follows:

- Museum of Aviation in Košice (opened 2002)
- Museum of Transport in Bratislava (opened 1999, specialises in road and rail transport)
- Museum of J.M. Petzval in Spišská Belá (opened 1964, focused on optics and photography)
- Manor house in Budimír (opened 1990, focused on historical clocks)
- Museum of cinematography of the Schuster family in Medzev
- Foundry in Medzev (opened 1967)
- Solivar near Prešov (opened 2001, focused on salt mining technology for boiling and pumping of salt)
- Blacksmith's workshop in Moldava nad Bodvou
- Blast furnace 'Karol' in Vlachovo

== See also ==
- List of museums in Slovakia
- List of transport museums in Slovakia
