= Horná Lehota, Brezno District =

Horná Lehota Felsőszabadi
- Municipality
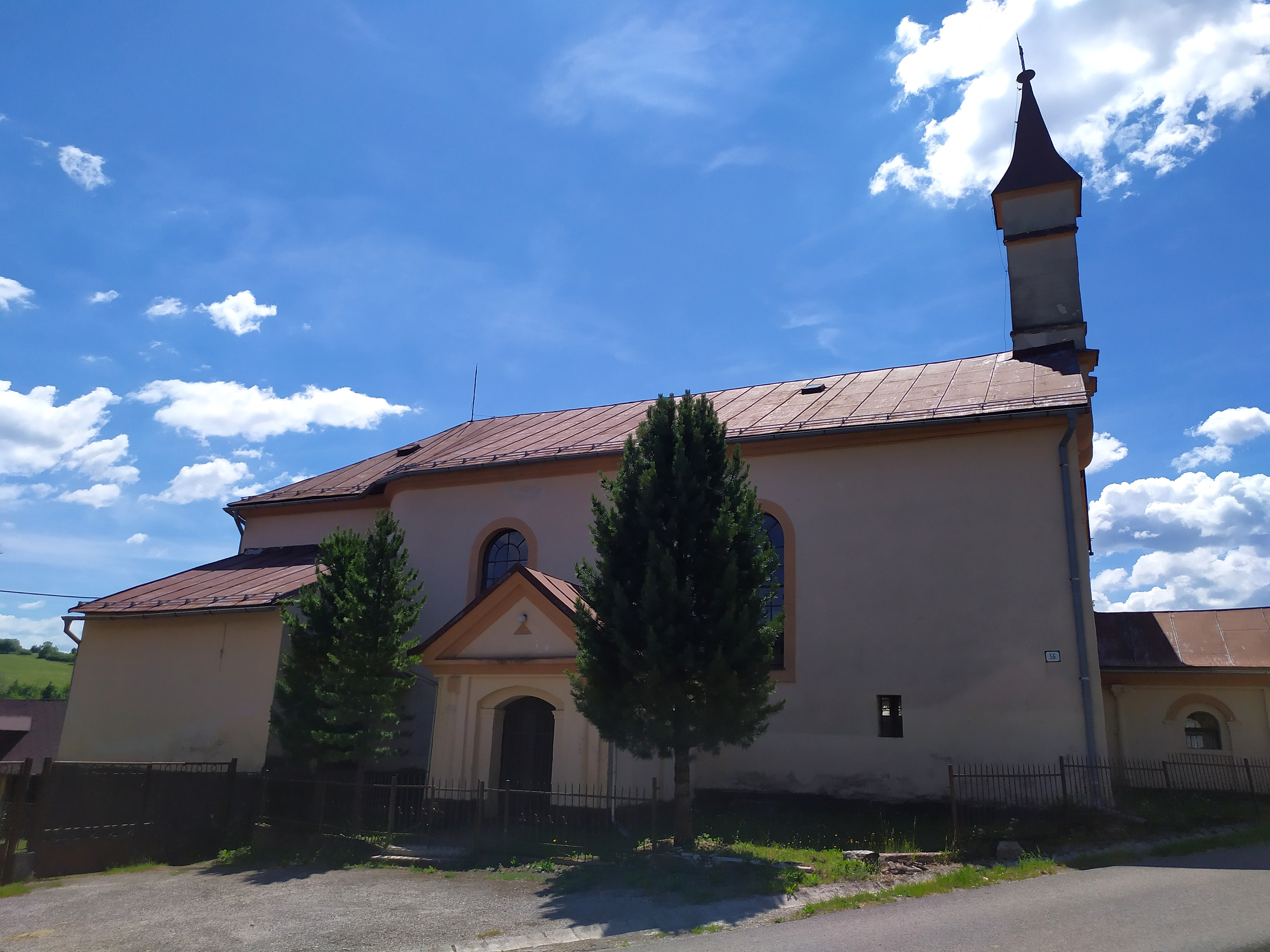
- Lutheran Church

- Flag

- Location of Horná Lehota in the Banská Bystrica Region Location of Horná Lehota in Slovakia
- Coordinates: 48°50′N 19°32′E
- Country: Slovakia
- Region: Banská Bystrica Region
- District: Brezno District
- First mentioned: 1406

Area
  - Total: 45.85 km^{2} (17.70 sq mi)
- Elevation: 532 m (1,745 ft)

Population (2025)
  - Total: 561
- Time zone: UTC+1 (CET)
  - Summer (DST): UTC+2 (CEST)
- Postal code: 976 51
- Area code: +421 48
- Vehicle registration plate (until 2022): BR
- Website: www.horna-lehota.sk

Horná Lehota (Hungarian: Felsőszabadi) is a village and municipality in Brezno District, in the Banská Bystrica Region of central Slovakia.

== History ==
In historical records, the village was first mentioned in 1406 (Superior Lehota). It belonged to the castle of Slovenská Ľupča.

== Population ==
Population statistic (10 years)
Year	1995	2005	2015	2025
Count	626	566	596	561
Difference		−9.58%	+5.30%	−5.87%

Population statistic
Year	2024	2025
Count	559	561
Difference		+0.35%

It has a population of 561 people (31 December 2025).

=== Ethnicity ===
Census 2021 (1+ %)
Ethnicity	Number	Fraction
Slovak	567	94.81%
Not found out	25	4.18%
Romani	8	1.33%
Total	598	

In year 2021 was 598 people by ethnicity 567 as Slovak, 25 as Not found out, 8 as Romani, 4 as Hungarian, 3 as Ukrainian, 2 as Czech, 1 as Austrian, 1 as Polish and 1 as Other.

Note on population: The difference values of population numbers in the table "Population statistic" and in the sections "Ethnicity" & "Religion" is caused by the use of various statistical methods.

=== Religion ===
Census 2021 (1+ %)
Religion	Number	Fraction
Roman Catholic Church	250	41.81%
None	205	34.28%
Evangelical Church	77	12.88%
Not found out	27	4.52%
Christian Congregations in Slovakia	10	1.67%
Greek Catholic Church	6	1%
Total	598	

In year 2021 was 598 people by religion 250 from Roman Catholic Church, 205 from None, 77 from Evangelical Church, 27 from Not found out, 10 from Christian Congregations in Slovakia, 6 from Greek Catholic Church, 5 from Other and not ascertained christian church, 5 from Ad hoc movements, 4 from Apostolic Church, 3 from Seventh-day Adventist Church, 1 from Old Catholic Church, 1 from Calvinist Church, 1 from Paganism and natural spirituality, 1 from Other, 1 from United Methodist Church and 1 from Buddhism.

== Famous people ==
- Samo Chalupka, writer

== Genealogical resources ==
The records for genealogical research are available at the state archive "Statny Archiv in Banska Bystrica, Slovakia"

- Roman Catholic church records (births/marriages/deaths): 1708-1923 (parish A)
- Lutheran church records (births/marriages/deaths): 1784-1927 (parish A)

== See also ==
- List of municipalities and towns in Slovakia
