= Samo Chalupka =

Slovak poet

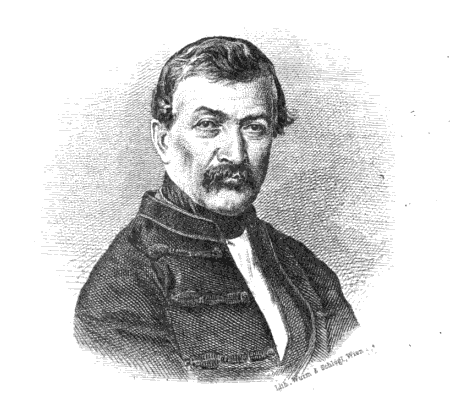
- Portrait of Chalupka
- Born: February 27, 1812; Horná Lehota, Austrian Empire (now Slovakia)
- Died: May 19, 1883 (aged 71); Horná Lehota, Austria-Hungary (now Slovakia)
- Occupation: Poet
- Writing career
- Language: Slovak
- Notable work: Mor ho! (1864)

Signature
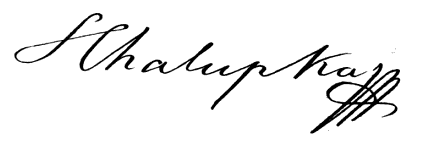

Samo Chalupka (27 February 1812 – 19 May 1883) was a Slovak Lutheran priest and romantic poet.

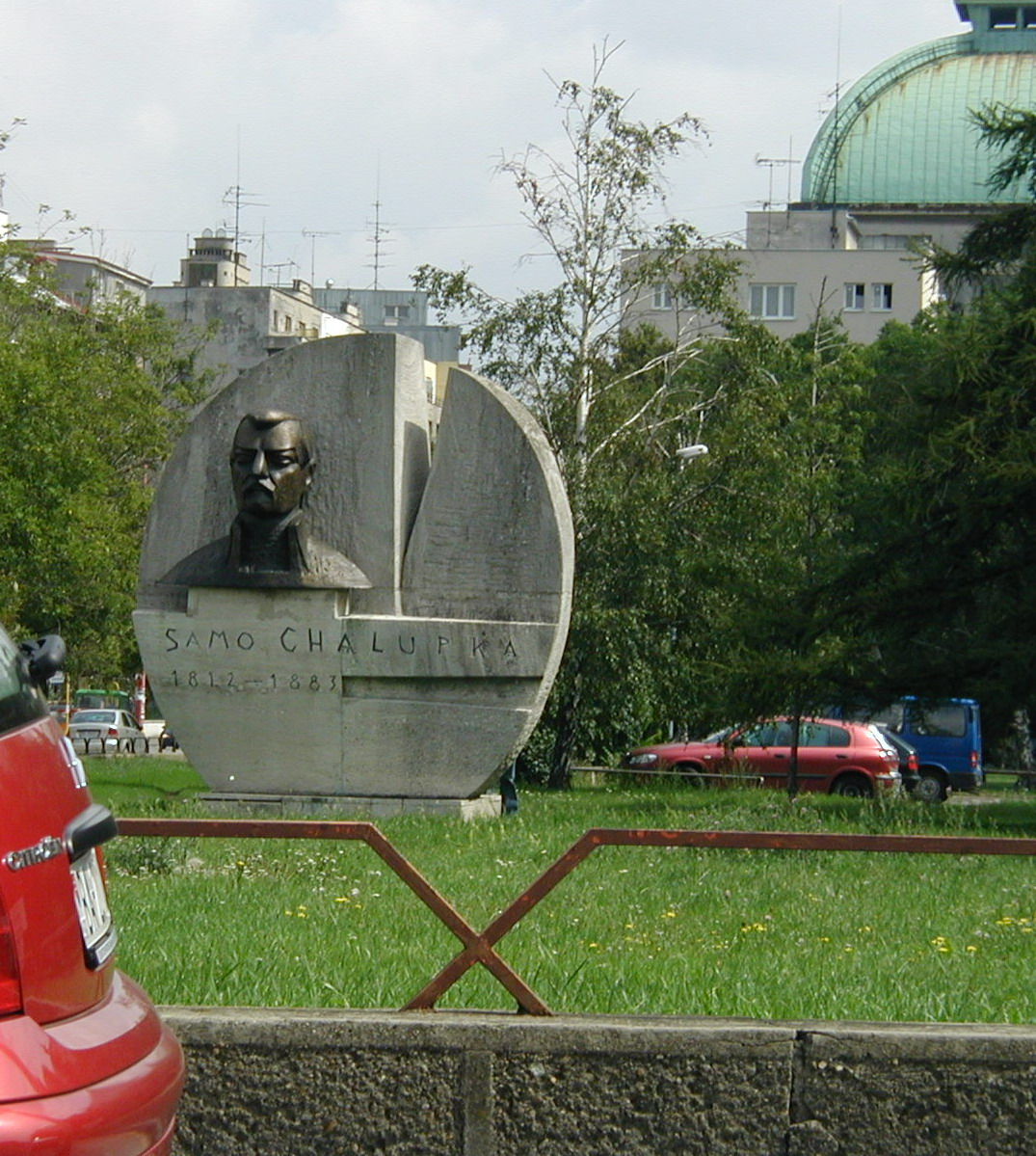
Monument to Chalupka near Račianske mýto in Bratislava

== Life ==
Samo Chalupka was a younger brother of Ján Chalupka, another Slovak writer. Samo studied at the Evangelical Lutheran Lyceum in Bratislava and also in Vienna. He studied theology and philosophy. When an uprising against Russia broke out in Poland in 1830, Samo Chalupka interrupted his long studies and fought on the Polish side. He was injured in 1831 and returned to Bratislava. He was the oldest member of the Ľudovít Štúr generation of the Slovak national revival. He was one of the founders and active members of the Czech-Slovak Society.

== Creation ==
He started writing in the so-called Czech biblical language while studying at lyceum in Bratislava. His debut poems were published in the almanac Plody (Fruit), in 1836. His works includes themes such as Slovak nature, patriotism and loyalty to his homeland and people. He often used Slovak folk songs in his works. In the 1840s, he joined the Slovak national revival led by Ľudovít Štúr because he wanted to codify the language of his nation. His first poem compilation Spevy (Vocals, 1868) was about this topic.

== Works ==
=== Poetry ===
- 1829 - Repertorium dispositionum
- 1834 - Koníku moj vraný Heje
- 1834 - Nářek slovenský
- 1834 - Píseň vojenská
- 1864 - Mor ho!
- 1868 - Spevy:
  - Likavský väzeň (original Jánošíkova náumka)
  - Kráľoholská
  - Branko
  - Kozák (original Syn vojny)
  - Turčín Poničan
  - Boj pri Jelšave
  - Odboj Kupov
- Vojenská
- Juhoslovanom
- Bolo i bude
- Večer pod Tatrou
- Při návratu do vlasti
- Smutek
- Toužba po vlasti
- Má vlast

=== Translations ===
- 1843 - Pálenka otrava, translation of Heinrich Zschokke Brandweinpest
