= Museum of Aviation (Košice) =

Coordinates: 48.6682°N 21.2356°E

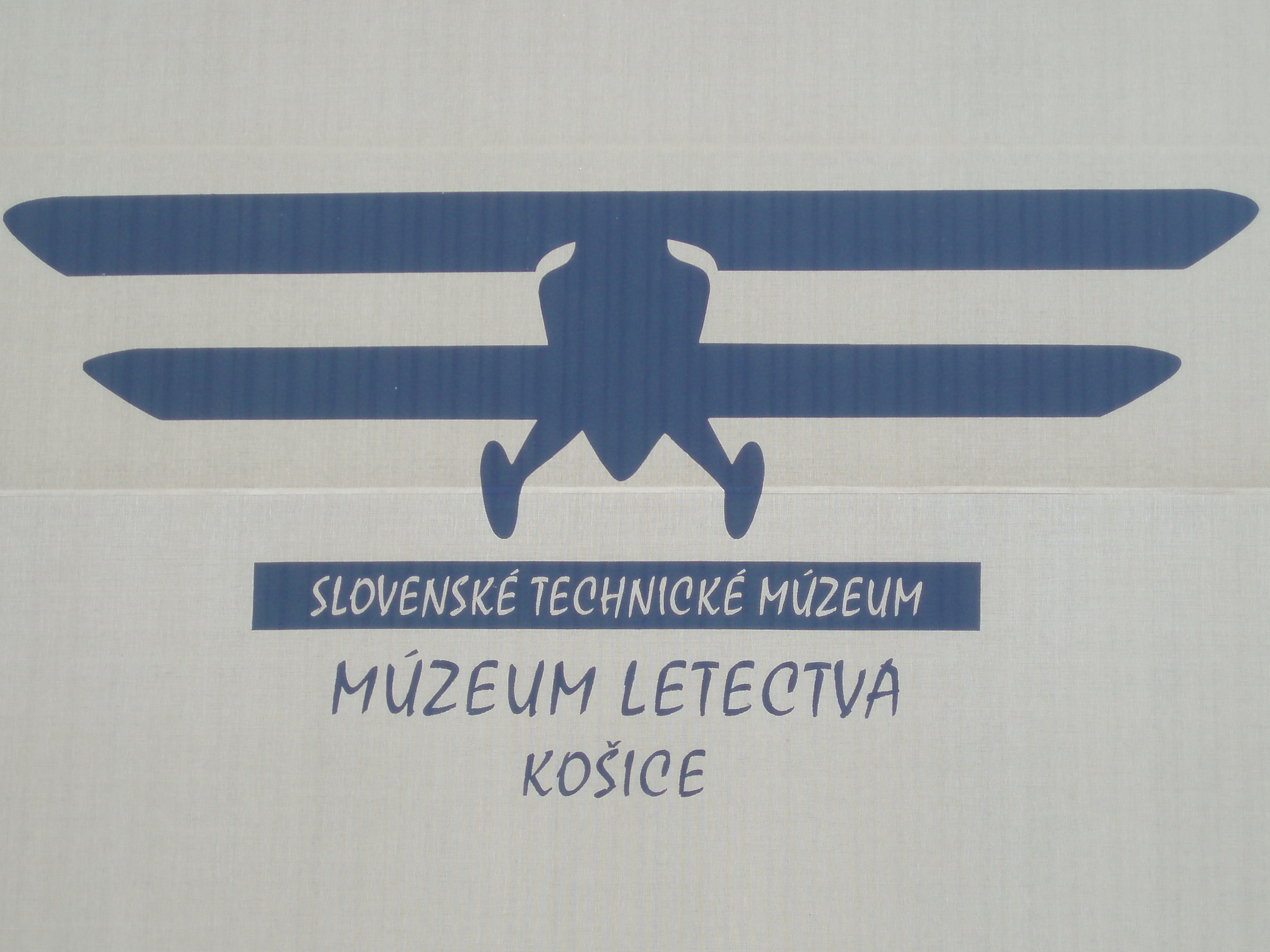
Museum of Aviation in Košice welcome sign

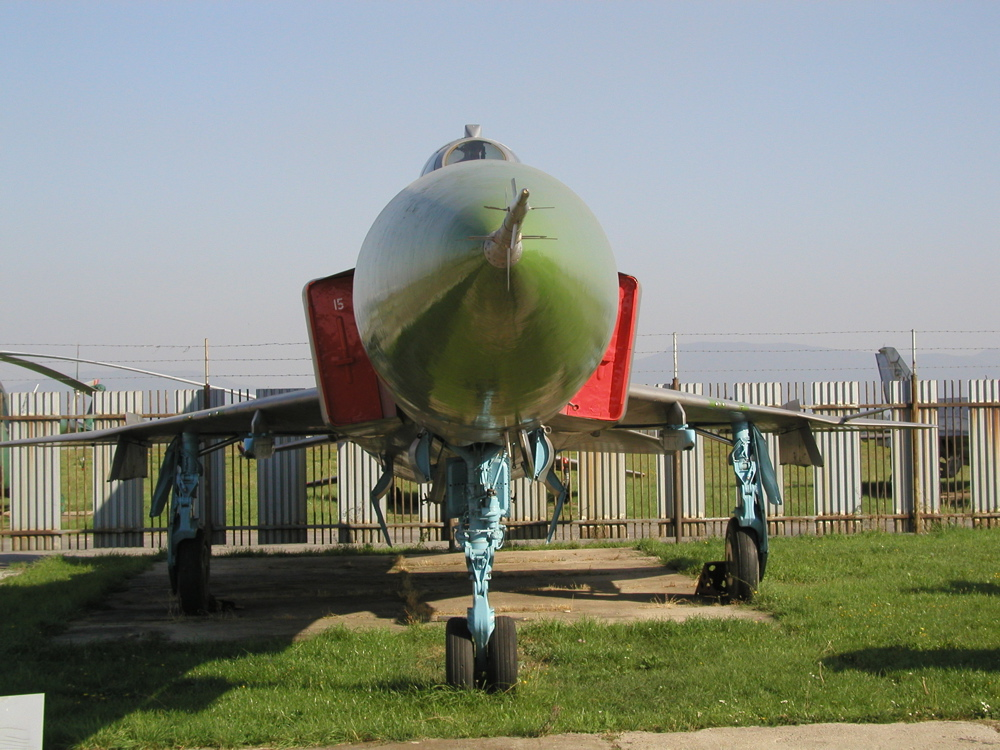
Open-air display of a Sukhoi Su-15 interceptor at the museum

The Museum of Aviation (Múzeum letectva Košice) is a transport and military history museum in Košice, Slovakia. It is a branch of the Slovak Technical Museum in Košice and is located near the Košice International Airport, on the outskirts of the city. It opened on August 23, 2002. After a general reconstruction and enlargement period that lasted since 2004, the museum reopened on September 2, 2006.

== Collections and exhibits ==
Its collections include a wide variety of heavier-than-air aircraft, aircraft engines and other technical accessories from various eras of aviation, with a focus on Slovak and European aviation history. Aircraft are displayed both indoors and in open-air displays on the museum's grounds. As of 2014, the collections include over 60 types of civilian and military aircraft from various periods and countries of origin, sans larger airliners.

The three main exhibits of the museum are displayed in three interconnected exhibition halls. They consist of collections pertaining to the development of aviation in Europe, Czechoslovakia and Slovakia until the end of World War II (i.e. the pre-jet era), the development of aviation in Czechoslovakia during the Cold War (jet era, 1950s domestic helicopter developments), and the development of aviation elsewhere in Europe during the Cold War, in that order. The aircraft inventory of the third exhibition consists largely of decommissioned military jet aircraft donated by the governments and militaries of various European countries and the United States. Due to the donations commonly being addressed to a current Slovak president, the exhibit is often dubbed "The Presidential Aircraft Gallery".

The museum's collection of former Slovak Air Force aircraft is one of the largest in the country. Several of the decommissioned aircraft are kept in storage, awaiting restoration work.

Smaller side exhibits focus on aviation-related technological accessories (mostly from the jet age), sports aviation history and related topics, and model aircraft displays.

== See also ==
- Museum of Transport, Bratislava - The other major transport museum branch of the Slovak Technical Museum.
- List of aerospace museums
- List of museums in Slovakia
- List of transport museums in Slovakia
