= Borová, Trnava District =

Borová
- Municipality
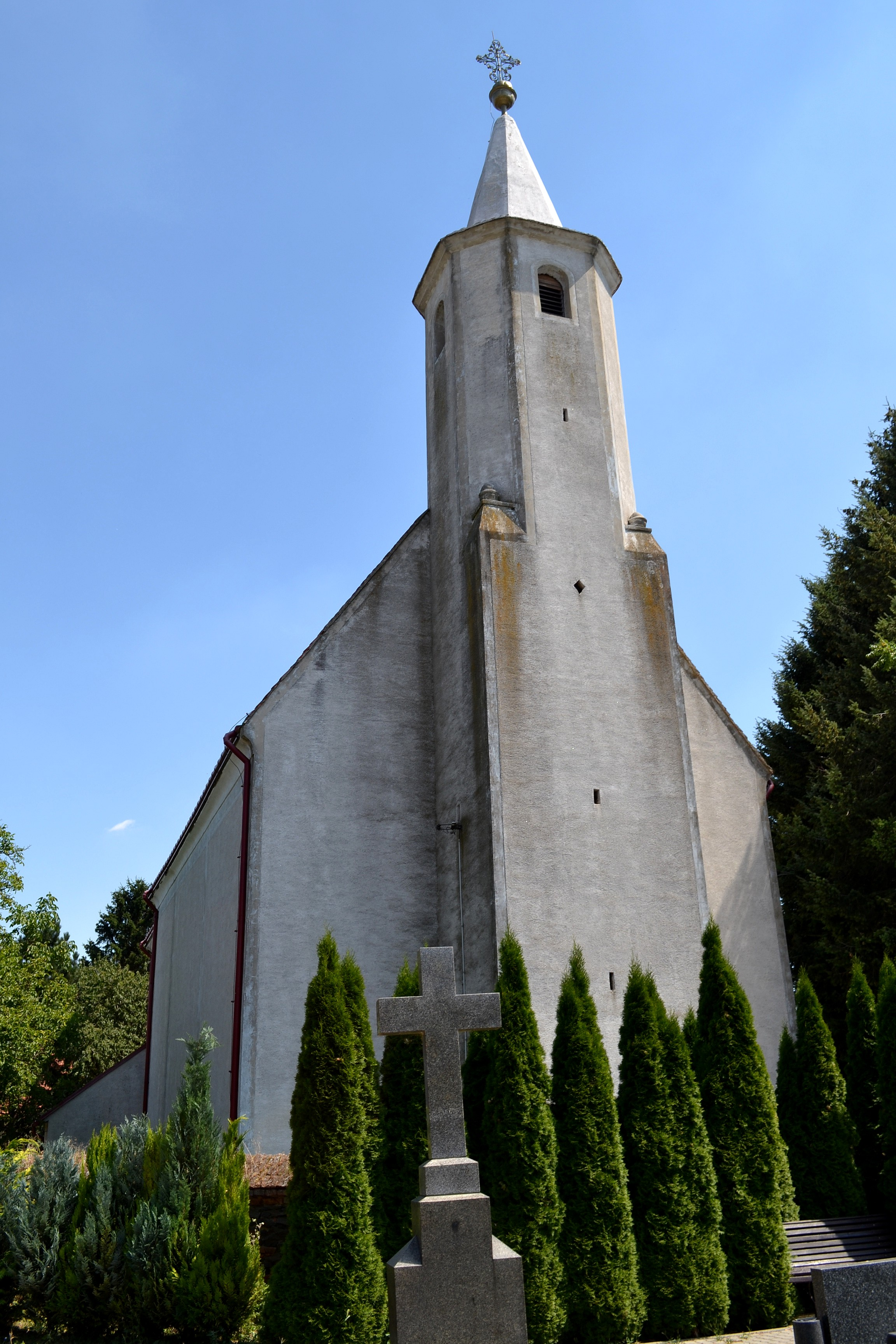

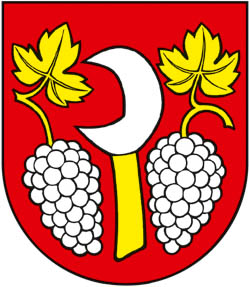
- Flag Coat of arms

- Location of Borová in the Trnava Region Location of Borová in Slovakia
- Coordinates: 48°23′N 17°27′E
- Country: Slovakia
- Region: Trnava Region
- District: Trnava District
- First mentioned: 1589

Area
  - Total: 5.90 km^{2} (2.28 sq mi)
- Elevation: 233 m (764 ft)

Population (2025)
  - Total: 452
- Time zone: UTC+1 (CET)
  - Summer (DST): UTC+2 (CEST)
- Postal code: 919 61
- Area code: +421 33
- Vehicle registration plate (until 2022): TT
- Website: borova.sk

Borová (Hungarian: Fenyves) is a municipality of Trnava District in the Trnava region of Slovakia.

== Geography ==
The municipality lies at an altitude of 233 metres (764 ft) and covers an area of 5.90 km^{2} (2.28 sq mi) (2025).

== Population ==
Population statistic (10 years)
Year	1995	2005	2015	2025
Count	287	356	425	452
Difference		+24.04%	+19.38%	+6.35%

Population statistic
Year	2024	2025
Count	454	452
Difference		−0.44%

It has a population of 452 people (31 December 2025).

=== Ethnicity ===
Census 2021 (1+ %)
Ethnicity	Number	Fraction
Slovak	455	97.43%
Not found out	16	3.42%
Total	467	

In year 2021 was 467 people by ethnicity 455 as Slovak, 16 as Not found out, 3 as Russian, 2 as Romanian, 1 as Czech, 1 as Hungarian and 1 as Other.

Note on population: The difference values of population numbers in the table "Population statistic" and in the sections "Ethnicity" & "Religion" is caused by the use of various statistical methods.

=== Religion ===
Census 2021 (1+ %)
Religion	Number	Fraction
Roman Catholic Church	321	68.74%
None	120	25.7%
Not found out	13	2.78%
Total	467	

In year 2021 was 467 people by religion 321 from Roman Catholic Church, 120 from None, 13 from Not found out, 3 from Other, 3 from Greek Catholic Church, 3 from Evangelical Church, 1 from Other and not ascertained christian church, 1 from Jehovah's Witnesses, 1 from Christian Congregations in Slovakia and 1 from Ad hoc movements.

== Genealogical resources ==
The records for genealogical research are available at the state archive "Statny Archiv in Bratislava, Slovakia"

- Roman Catholic church records (births/marriages/deaths): 1687-1915 (parish B)

== See also ==
- List of municipalities and towns in Slovakia
