= Šancová Street =

Street in Bratislava, Slovakia

Coordinates: 48°10′N 17°07′E

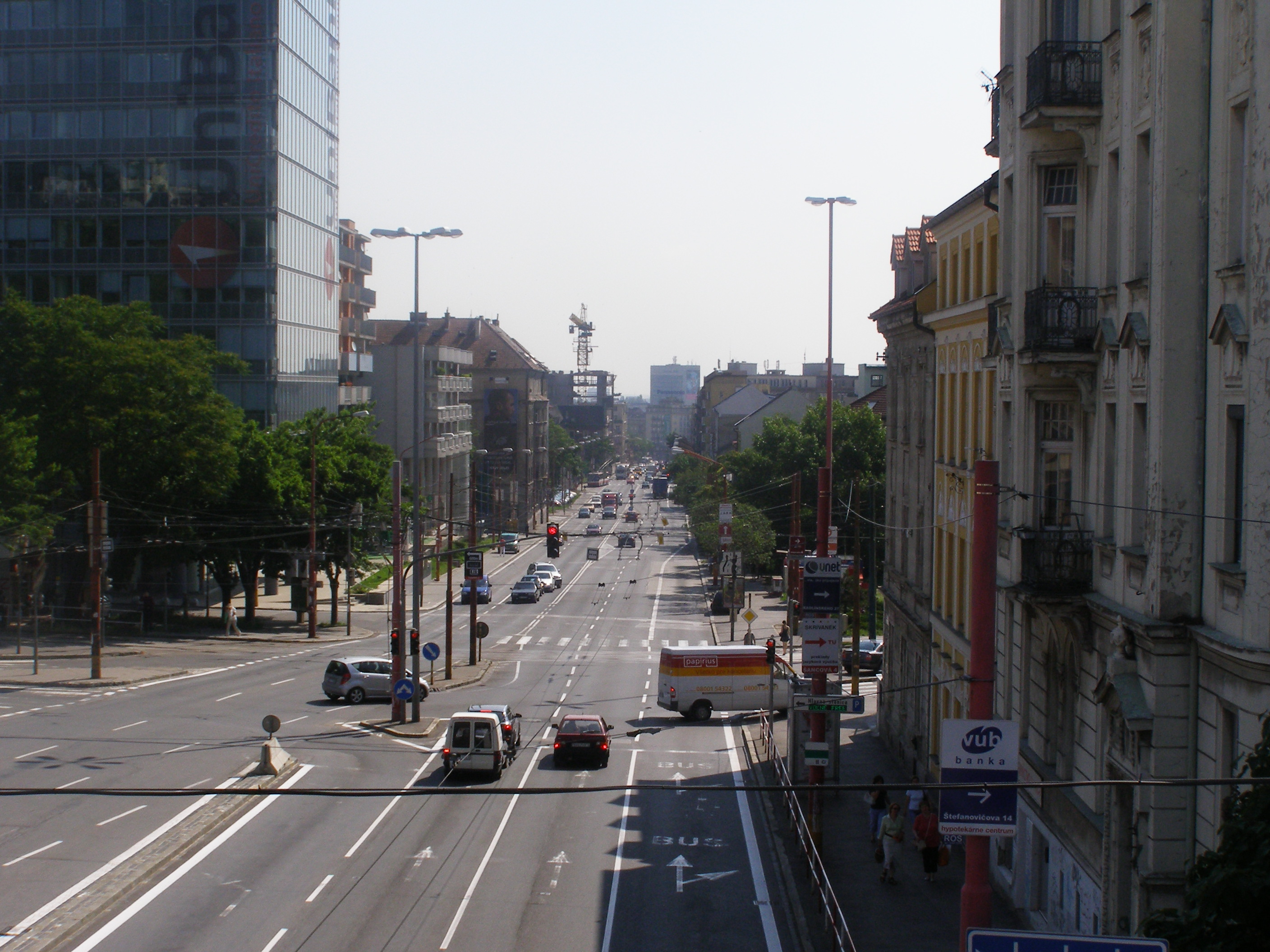
Šancová ulica

Šancová Street (Slovak: Šancová ulica) is a major street in Bratislava's Old Town, extending from the intersection of Štefánikova ulica and Pražská ulica to Trnavské mýto. It is a significant transport artery, and site of frequent traffic congestion.

== Origin of the name ==
The street is named for the ramparts (Slovak: šance, German: Schanze), Hungarian: sánc), which were previously located here, forming part of the customs border for the city. These were finally removed in 1903.

Through history, the route has borne several different names:

- 1766: Za čiarou (Slovak: Behind the line), referring to the toll border of the city
- 1768: Mauth Thor Linie (German)
- 1769: Linie Graben (German)
- 1775: Linie (German)
- 1795: Inner der Schanz (German)
- 1800: An der Schanze (German)
- 1807: Linea ad montem Calvariae (Latin: Line to Mount Calvary)
- 1876: Schanzstrasse (German: Rampart Street)
- 1879: Felső Sánc-út (Hungarian)
- 1880: Schanzgrabenstrasse (German)
- 1904: Schulpe Györg-Kolonie (German)
- 1915: Szultán ő felsége (Hungarian), after Ottoman Sultan Mehmed V, ally of the Central Powers in World War I
- 1921: Šancová ulica (Slovak)
- 1927: Valy (Slovak: Ramparts, Embankments)
- 1945: Malinovského ulica (Slovak), in honor of Soviet military commander Rodion Malinovsky (1898-1967), whose division liberated Bratislava from Nazi Germany
- 1990: Šancová ulica

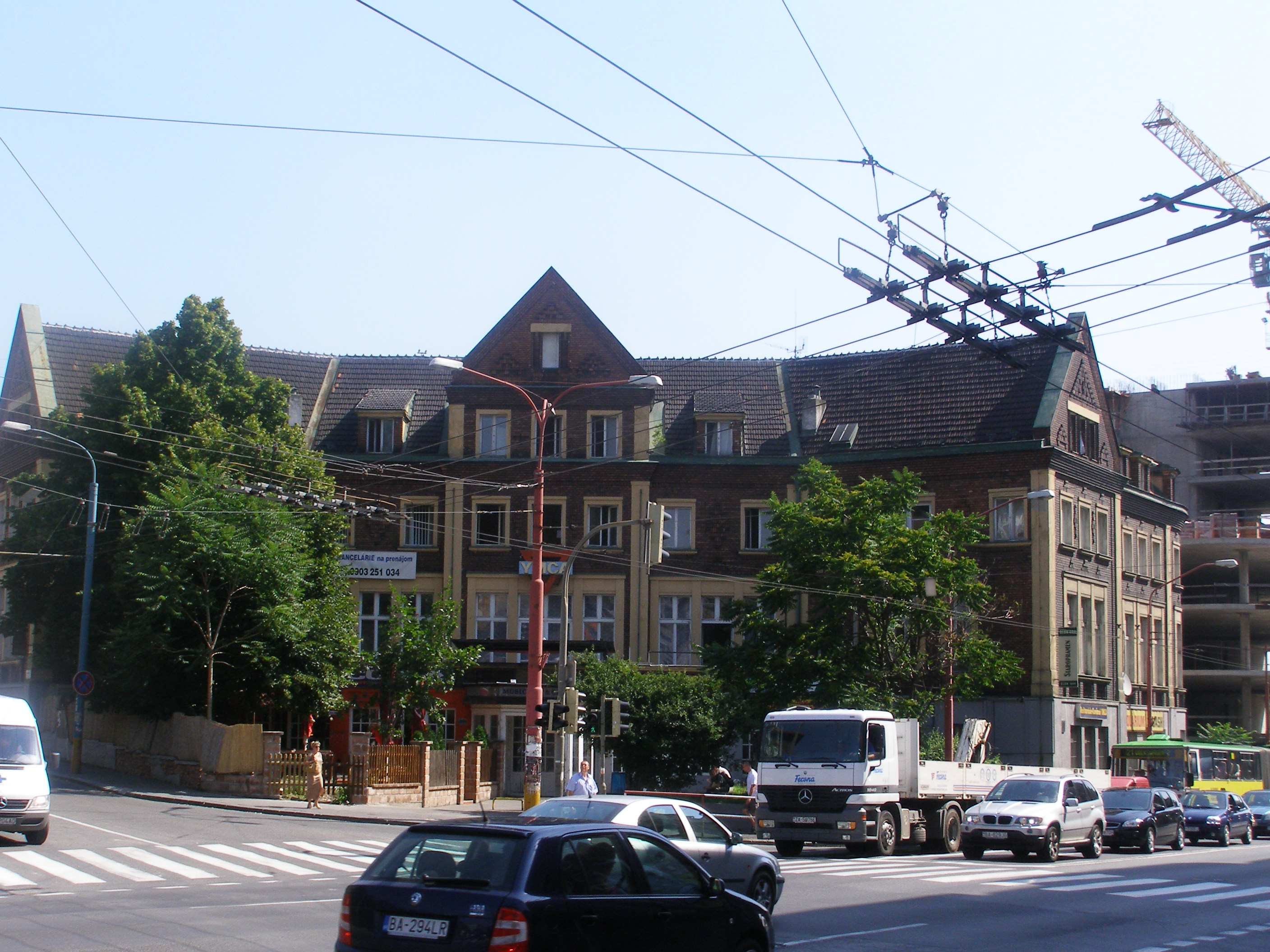
YMCA Theater

== Significant buildings ==
The YMCA building (formerly YMCA theater and sometimes Dukla), dating to 1921, can be found here. Nearby stands a building that has been under construction for some years, which was to be 34 floors high upon completion. As of April 2007, only 8 above-ground levels have been completed, and it remains today in this unfinished state.

== Nearby streets ==
- Karpatská Street
- Jelenia Street
- Pražská Street
- Račianske mýto
- Radlinského Street
- Štefánikova Street
- Trnavské mýto
