= Račianske mýto =

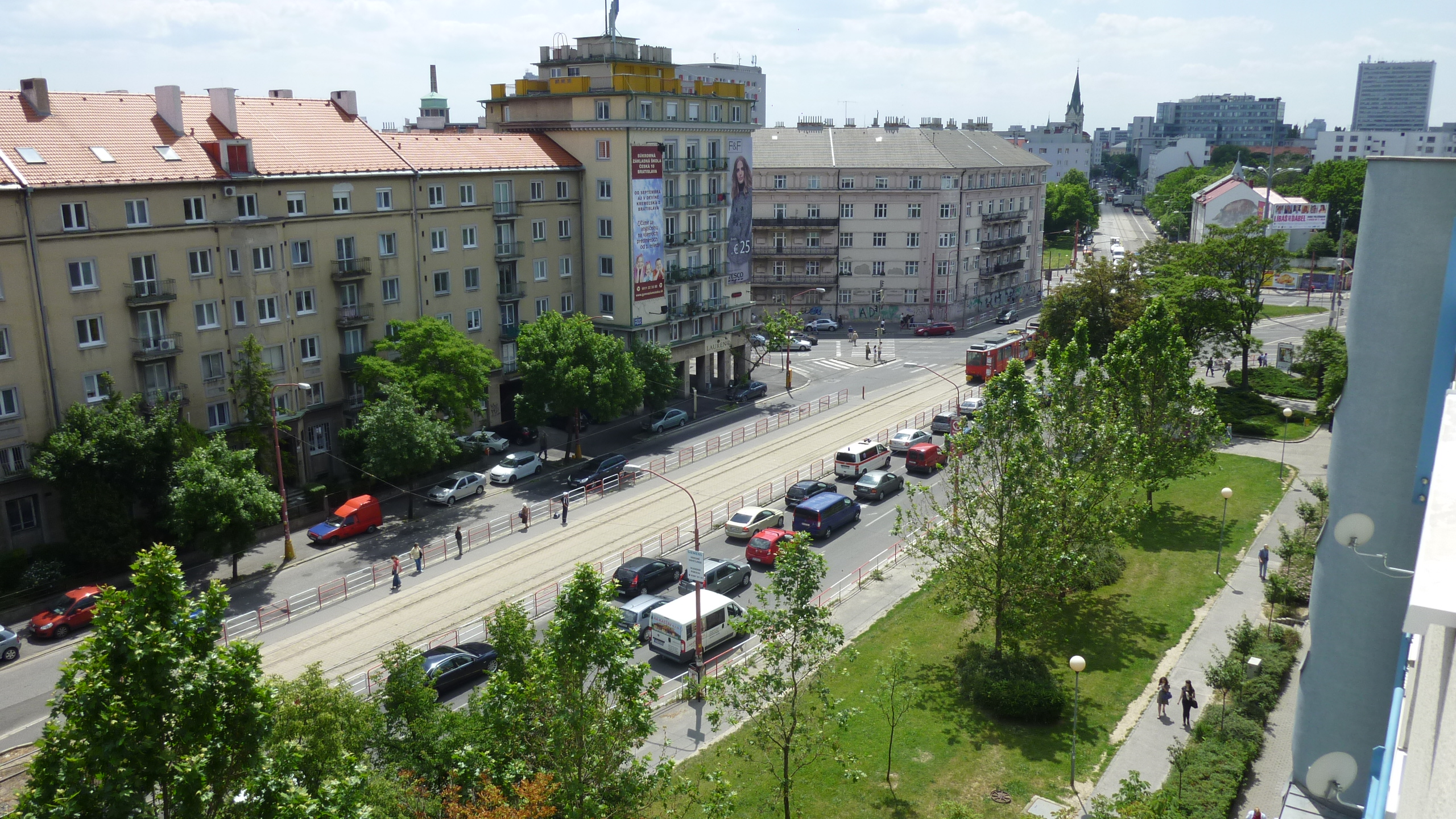
Račianske mýto

Račianske mýto (literally Rača Toll) is a major transport junction and intersection in Bratislava, the capital of Slovakia. It connects the city center with the suburb of Rača and also serves as a transport artery between Trnavské mýto and Old Town.

Račianske mýto also contains an attached city park and several major public transport stops. It is located at the border of the Old Town and New Town districts, located at 48°9′28″N 17°07′12″E.

== Description ==
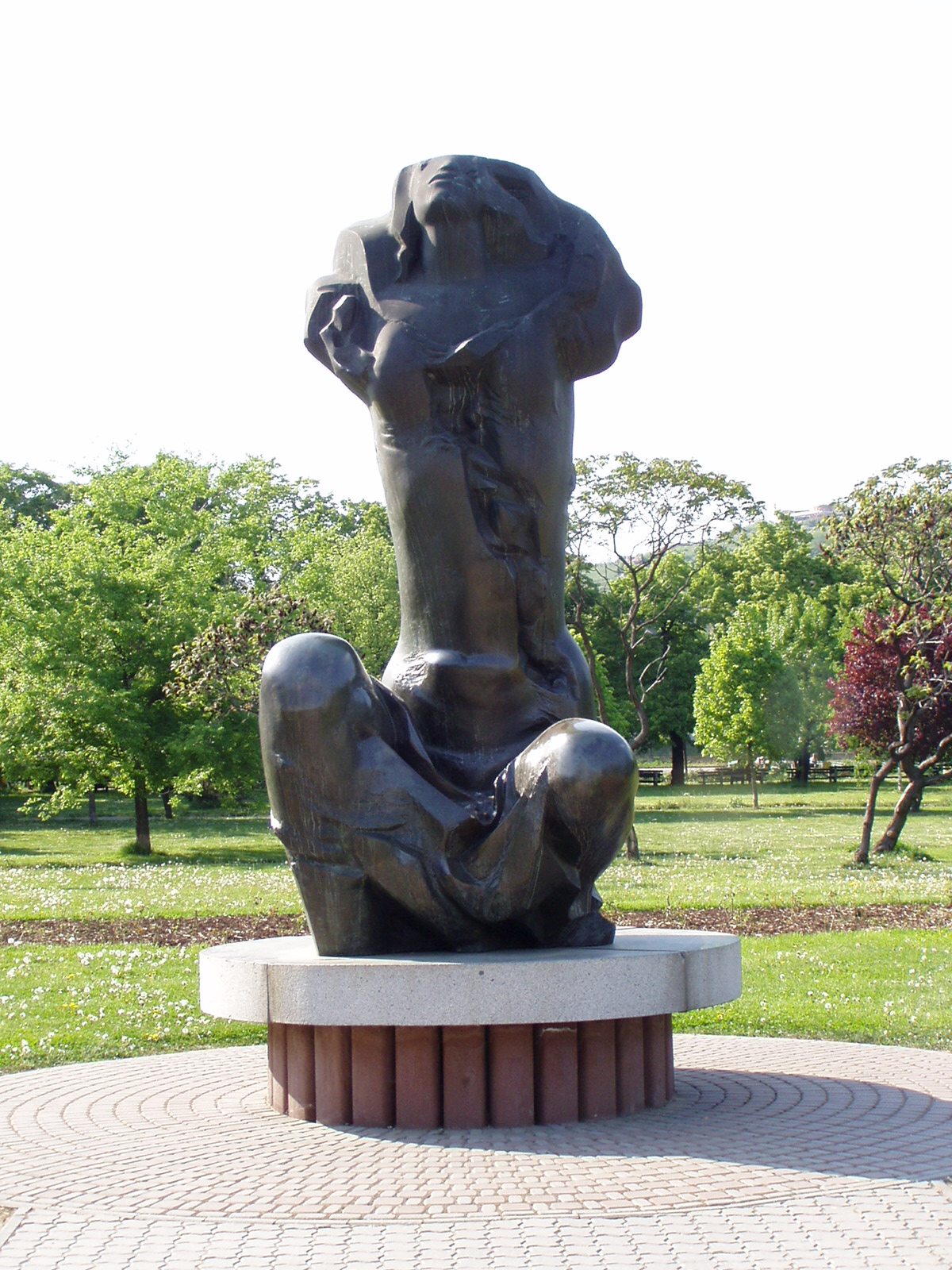
Hirošima statue standing in the park attached to Račianske mýto

In addition to the streets mentioned below, the intersection is crossed by tram lines north-south, trolleybus lines east-west, and bus routes in all directions.

The northwestern side of the area includes a park and building complex, partially built on the site of two former cemeteries. Near the park's central fountain is a monument, erected in 2002 to commemorate this history. Nearby stands a statue entitled Hirošima, a gift from sculptor Tibor Bártfay, at the former site of a Soviet statue of a militiaman dating to 1972 commemorating the Red Army's victory over Nazi Germany.

== History ==
Račianske mýto arose in 1767, when a toll (Slovak: mýto) house was erected at the site (at that time, this was the border of the town). From the late 18th century, it was called Ratschdorfer Linie, German for "Line of Rača", referring to the line which, after a trader crossed it, a toll was due. From 1861 it was known as Récsei vámsoromszok (Hungarian), from 1920 Račištorfské mýto, and it has borne its current name from 1945 onwards. Račianske mýto takes its name from its situation on the road connecting Bratislava to Rača ("Račianske") and from the toll point ("mýto"), though no tolls are collected there anymore.

The tram track from the city center via Radlinského and Račianske mýto to Gaštanový hájik (later to Komisárky) was completed in 1899. The Roman Catholic and Protestant cemeteries, dating to 1778 and 1781, respectively, were relocated to Slávičie údolie in the 1960s (some remains were relocated to other resting places in accordance with the wishes of the families). The park area, however, is still owned by the Church even until today.

== Connecting streets ==
- Šancová Street, heading roughly west toward the main rail station and east toward Trnavské mýto
- Račianska Street, heading northeast toward Rača
- Legionárska Street, heading southeast
- Mýtna Street, heading southeast toward the city center
- Radlinského Street, heading south toward Floriánske námestie and the city center

== Sources ==
Archív hlavného mesta SSR Bratislavy (1979). Ján Mojžiš (ed.). Dejiny Bratislavy (in Slovak) (2nd ed.). Bratislava: Vydavateľstvo Obzor, n. p.

Horváth, Jozef (1971). "Vzník a vývin cintorínov v Bratislava do roku 1918". In Kalesný, František (ed.). Spisy mestského múzea v Bratislava / BRATISLAVA. Vol. VI. Osveta. pp. 245–266.

Horváth, Vladimír (1990). Bratislavský topografický lexikon (in Slovak). Bratislava: Tatran. pp. 178–179. ISBN 80-222-0229-0.
