= Horná Mičiná =

Horná Mičiná Felsőmicsinye
- Municipality
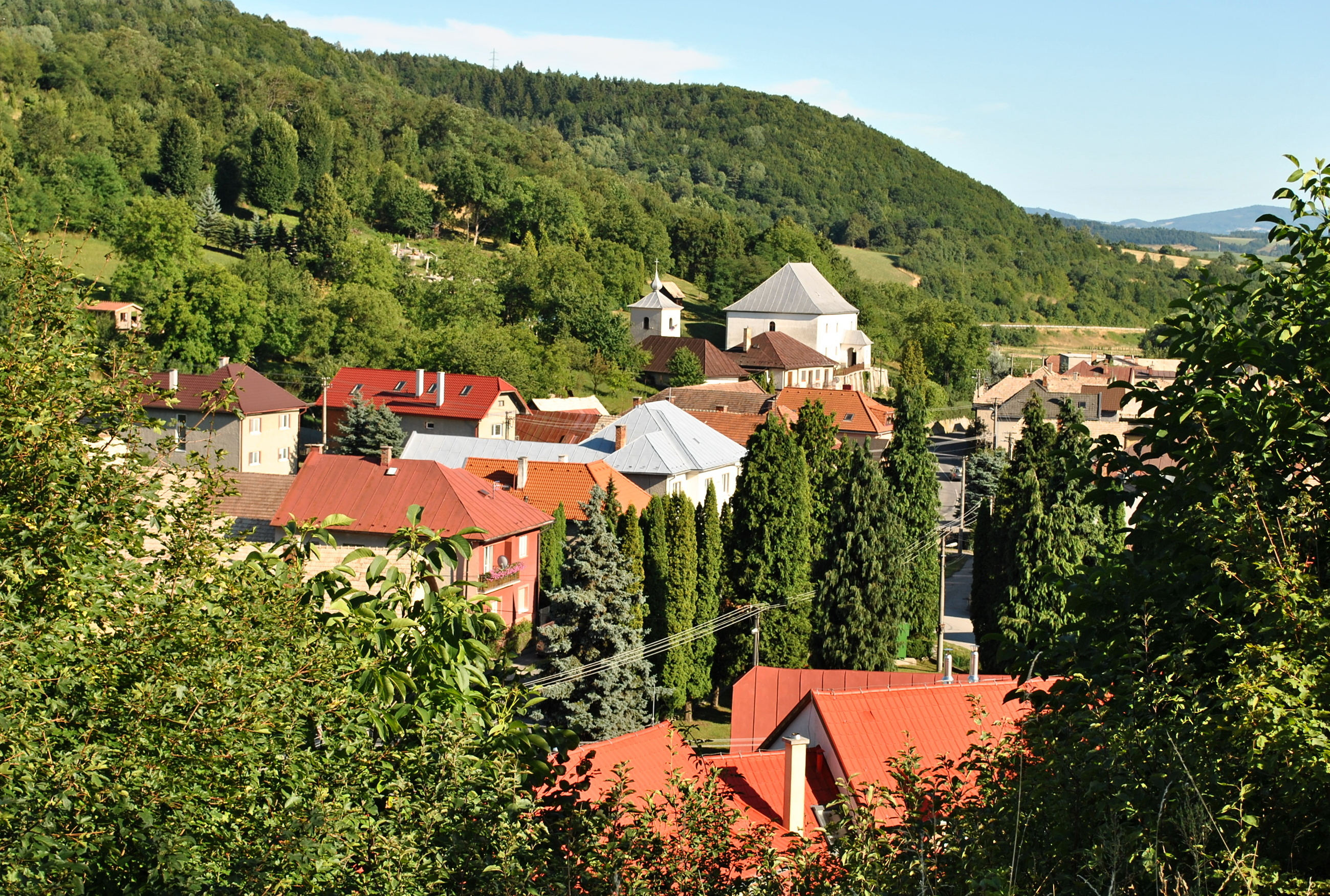
- View of the village with Protestant church

- Flag

- Location of Horná Mičiná in the Banská Bystrica Region Location of Horná Mičiná in Slovakia
- Coordinates: 48.70°N 19.22°E
- Country: Slovakia
- Region: Banská Bystrica Region
- District: Banská Bystrica District
- First mentioned: 1293

Area
  - Total: 15.69 km^{2} (6.06 sq mi)
- Elevation: 437 m (1,434 ft)

Population (2025)
  - Total: 692
- Time zone: UTC+1 (CET)
  - Summer (DST): UTC+2 (CEST)
- Postal code: 974 01
- Area code: +421 48
- Vehicle registration plate (until 2022): BB
- Website: www.hornamicina.eu/web/

Horná Mičiná (Hungarian: Felsőmicsinye) is a village and municipality of the Banská Bystrica District in the Banská Bystrica Region of Slovakia.

== History ==
In historical records, the village was first mentioned in 1293 (1293 terra Myka, 1300 terra comitis Mike, 1309 Lehatha, 1395 Mykelyhotha, Mykofalwa, 1402 Mykefalva, 1446 Micafalw, 1469 Miczinawess, 1521 Mitzina, 1523 Superior Mykelfalwa, 1567 Miczina), when it belonged to Count Mike (Michael). After on, it was possessed by Zvolen. In the 16th century, it belonged to local feudatory Micsinyey, and, later on, to the Benicky family.

== Geography ==
The municipality lies at an altitude of 437 metres (1,434 ft) and covers an area of 15.69 km^{2} (6.06 sq mi) (2025).

== Population ==
Population statistic (10 years)
Year	1995	2005	2015	2025
Count	475	507	619	692
Difference		+6.73%	+22.09%	+11.79%

Population statistic
Year	2024	2025
Count	698	692
Difference		−0.85%

It has a population of 692 people (31 December 2025).

=== Ethnicity ===
Census 2021 (1+ %)
Ethnicity	Number	Fraction
Slovak	618	96.41%
Not found out	10	1.56%
Czech	8	1.24%
Austrian	7	1.09%
Total	641	

In year 2021 was 641 people by ethnicity 618 as Slovak, 10 as Not found out, 8 as Czech, 7 as Austrian, 5 as Italian, 2 as Russian, 2 as German, 2 as Other, 1 as Romani, 1 as Rusyn, 1 as Romanian, 1 as Polish and 1 as Hungarian.

Note on population: The difference values of population numbers in the table "Population statistic" and in the sections "Ethnicity" & "Religion" is caused by the use of various statistical methods.

=== Religion ===
Census 2021 (1+ %)
Religion	Number	Fraction
Evangelical Church	260	40.56%
None	183	28.55%
Roman Catholic Church	159	24.8%
Not found out	15	2.34%
Greek Catholic Church	8	1.25%
Total	641	

In year 2021 was 641 people by religion 260 from Evangelical Church, 183 from None, 159 from Roman Catholic Church, 15 from Not found out, 8 from Greek Catholic Church, 4 from Other and not ascertained christian church, 4 from Church of the Brethren, 3 from Ad hoc movements, 2 from Other, 1 from Paganism and natural spirituality, 1 from Seventh-day Adventist Church and 1 from Bahá'i Community.

== People ==
- Ján Chalupka, dramatist
