= Mor ho! =

1864 poem by Samo Chalupka

"Mor ho!" is a Slovak patriotic poem from the Romantic era written by Samo Chalupka in 1864. It binds folklore inspirations and historicism together.

== Content ==
The Roman emperor (tsar) sets up camp in Pannonia on the border to Slovakia. The Slovaks send local heralds – brave young men – to the Emperor. They give him a peace offering of bread and salt from the old people's council. They warn him not to attack the Slovaks because they have always been free of supremacy, and tell him that the Slovaks are hospitable but they fight hard and do not give up. The emperor rejects the peace offering and replies that he comes to enslave the Slovaks. Then the Slovak young men start shouting Mor ho! ('Kill him!') and fight the Emperor with swords. In the fight, the young men die with the good feeling that they did not give up. Afterwards, the Emperor looks at the battlefield and is ashamed to be happy about the young men's defeat because so many of his soldiers died.

== Characteristics ==
The poem expresses the spirit of democracy and deep patriotism in a romantic way. The main focus is on 2 opposing ideas and worlds: the desire for peace, freedom and equality in their beautiful land with proud citizens, against violence, enslavement and aggression. The Slovaks sacrifice their lives for noble dreams and they are the moral winners; on the other hand, the Romans are ashamed as slaves are.

Chalupka chose a form of folklore literature, language and syllabic rhythm to emphasise the poem's spirit of democracy.

== Theme of the poem ==
The poem was based on Šafárik's book History of the Slavic language and literature from 1826, in which Šafárik wrote about an armed fight between the Limigantes and the Roman Emperor Constantius II, who invaded Pannonia in 358 AD.

The author commented on his poem in the magazine Sokol (Falcon) in 1864: I can see the true reason for the emperor's malice in the Slovak's free mindfulness. What could be more dangerous and hateful for Rome, which enslaved all nations, than the principle of general freedom and equality, which couldn't be found in any other nation apart from the Slovaks at that period. The Slovaks won their freedom and cast out their masters. This example could influence others, in particular Slavistic nations under the rule of Rome. Thus, out of fear the emperor demanded the peaceful Slovaks to move out of the Roman land.

== Interpretation ==
The poem was an impulse of patriotic enthusiasm from Chalupka's peers and the older generations (for example during the Slovak National Revival).

== Sources ==
- Kováč, D. et al.: Kronika Slovenska 1, 1998
- Minárik, J. et al.: Literárna rukoväť, 1988
- poem

== External sources ==
- Poem can be found on Zlatý fond SME
