= Raková, Čadca District =

Raková
- Municipality
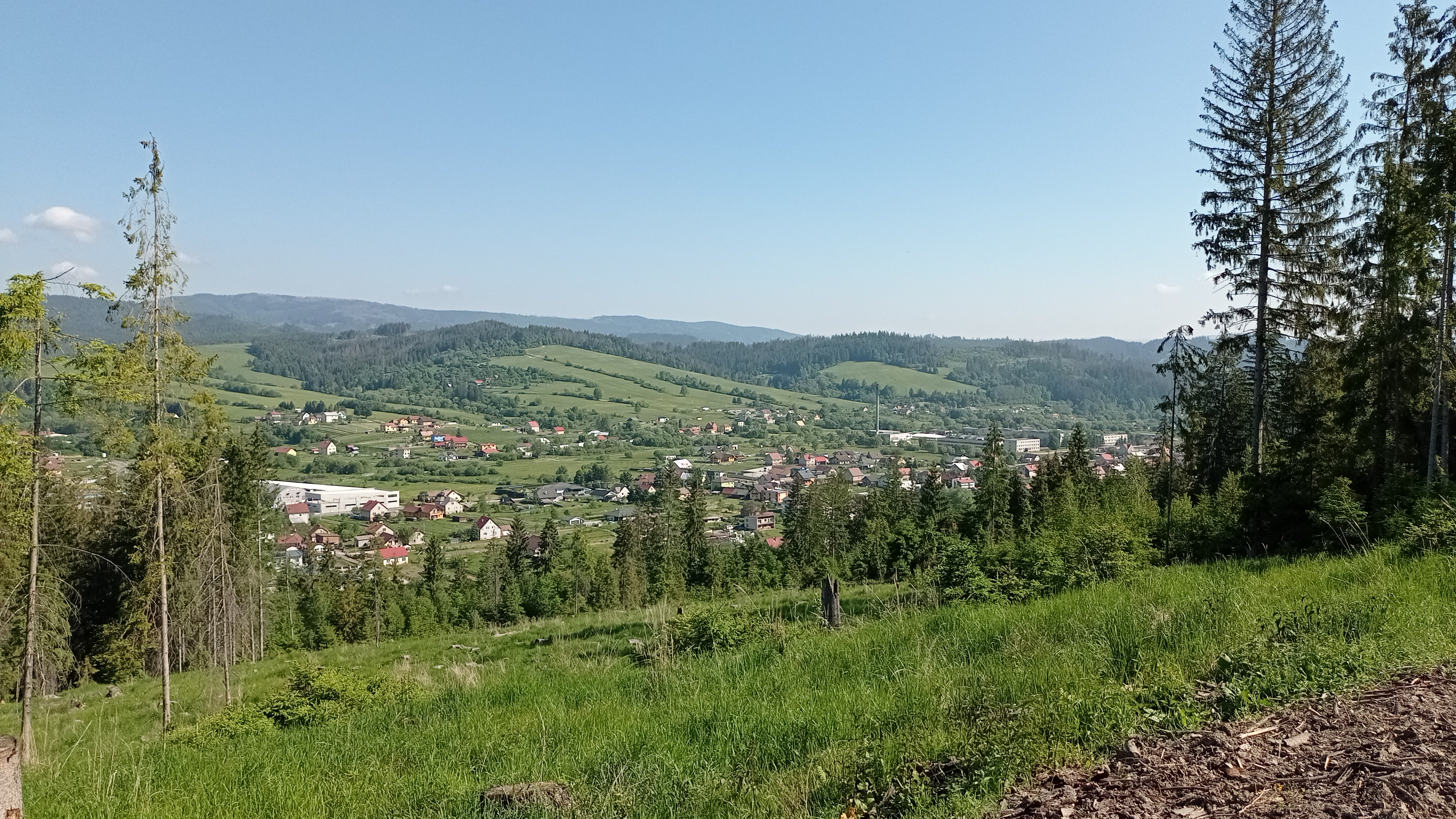

- Flag Coat of arms

- Location of Raková in the Žilina Region Location of Raková in Slovakia
- Coordinates: 49°26′35″N 18°44′4″E
- Country: Slovakia
- Region: Žilina Region
- District: Čadca District
- First mentioned: 1658

Area
  - Total: 41.51 km^{2} (16.03 sq mi)
- Elevation: 430 m (1,410 ft)

Population (2025)
  - Total: 5,577
- Time zone: UTC+1 (CET)
  - Summer (DST): UTC+2 (CEST)
- Postal code: 235 1
- Area code: +421 41
- Vehicle registration plate (until 2022): CA
- Website: www.rakova.sk/sk/

Raková (Hungarian: Trencsénrákó) is a village and municipality in Čadca District in the Žilina Region of northern Slovakia.

== History ==
In historical records the village was first mentioned in 1658. The village is the birthplace of the writer and playwright Ján Palárik, who is honored by the annual Palárikova Raková event and who played a significant role in the Slovak nationalist movement in the 19th century.

== Geography ==
The municipality lies at an altitude of 430 metres (1,410 ft) and covers an area of 41.51 km^{2} (16.03 sq mi) (2025).

== Population ==
Population statistic (10 years)
Year	1995	2005	2015	2025
Count	4732	5170	5463	5577
Difference		+9.25%	+5.66%	+2.08%

Population statistic
Year	2024	2025
Count	5603	5577
Difference		−0.46%

It has a population of 5577 people (31 December 2025).

=== Ethnicity ===
Census 2021 (1+ %)
Ethnicity	Number	Fraction
Slovak	5546	98.5%
Not found out	73	1.29%
Total	5630	

In year 2021 was 5630 people by ethnicity 5546 as Slovak, 73 as Not found out, 48 as Czech, 8 as Polish, 7 as Russian, 7 as Other, 5 as Rusyn, 3 as English, 2 as Vietnamese, 2 as Silesian, 2 as German, 2 as Moravian, 2 as French, 2 as Bulgarian, 1 as Jewish, 1 as Irish, 1 as Serbian, 1 as Romani, 1 as Romanian, 1 as Austrian and 1 as Canadian.

Note on population: The difference values of population numbers in the table "Population statistic" and in the sections "Ethnicity" & "Religion" is caused by the use of various statistical methods.

=== Religion ===
Census 2021 (1+ %)
Religion	Number	Fraction
Roman Catholic Church	5050	89.7%
None	361	6.41%
Not found out	109	1.94%
Total	5630	

In year 2021 was 5630 people by religion 5050 from Roman Catholic Church, 361 from None, 109 from Not found out, 20 from Evangelical Church, 19 from Greek Catholic Church, 16 from Ad hoc movements, 15 from Christian Congregations in Slovakia, 9 from Other, 5 from Calvinist Church, 5 from Paganism and natural spirituality, 4 from Old Catholic Church, 3 from Eastern Orthodox Church, 3 from Jehovah's Witnesses, 3 from Buddhism, 2 from New Apostolic Church, 1 from Other and not ascertained christian church, 1 from Hinduism, 1 from United Methodist Church, 1 from Seventh-day Adventist Church, 1 from Church of Jesus Christ of Latter-day Saints and 1 from Apostolic Church.
