= Tatra 15 =

Railway automobile

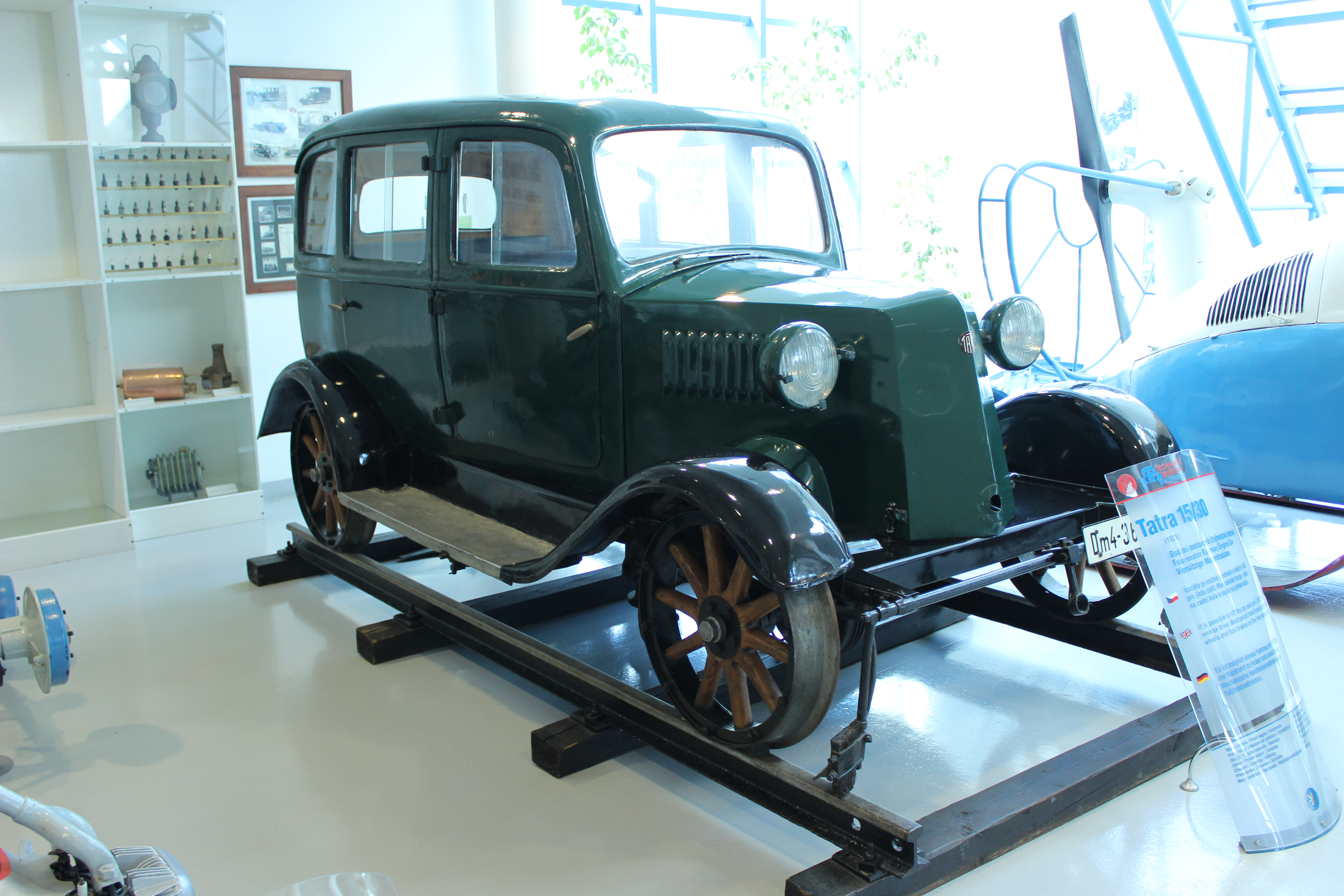
- Tatra 15 for display at Tatra Technical Museum, Kopřivnice, Czech Republic

Overview
- Type: Railroad speeder
- Manufacturer: Tatra
- Production: 1927-1952

Body and chassis
- Body style: Sedan
- Doors: 4

Powertrain
- Engine: Tatra 12 (1927) Tatra 30 (1932) Tatra 52 (1947)
- Power output: 22-30hp
- Transmission: Two speed manual

Dimensions
- Wheelbase: 2420-2720mm
- Length: 3970-417mm
- Width: 1750mm
- Height: 1800mm
- Curb weight: 1250-1430kg

The Tatra 15 was a railroad speeder which was produced from 1926 to 1952 and was in service till 1972 by Tatra Kopřivnice. The vehicle had a normal sedan class car body with four doors and sitting capacity of three crew members and one driver, these were used as railway maintenance vehicle. There were three models produced over time 12, 30 and 52 each one had bigger engine than before the last generation 52 model had a Petrol, air-cooled inline four-cylinder engine which produced 30hp. It has a two speed manual transmission and drum brakes at front and rear, while the vehicle was front engine and rear driven. The vehicle was intended to drive in both directions, for which a lifting system was installed in the middle of the vehicle to turn in the preferred direction

The vehicle has the same levels of comfort as normal road driven cars, with solid axles and leaf spring suspensions at both front and rear. All three models are available for display at Tatra technical museum Kopřivnice, Czech Republic. The vehicle was seen in a 1966 comedy film Closely Watched Trains produced by Barrandov Studios.

== See also ==
- Railroad speeder
- Road–rail vehicle
- Handcar
- Draisine
- Railbus
- Tatra
