= Ján Chalupka =

Slovak dramatist, playwright, publicist and Evangelical pastor

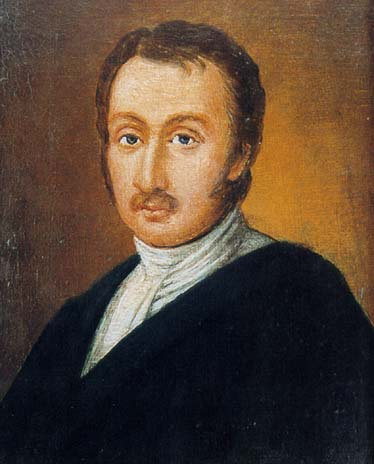
- Born: 28 October 1791; Horná Mičiná, Kingdom of Hungary, Habsburg monarchy
- Died: 15 July 1871 (aged 79); Brezno, Austria-Hungary
- Occupation: dramatist

Ján Chalupka (Hungarian: Chalupka János; 28 October 1791 – 15 July 1871) was a Slovak dramatist, playwright, publicist and Evangelical pastor.

== Life ==
He was born in Horná Mičiná in the Kingdom of Hungary (now Slovakia), into the family of Evangelical pastor Adam Chalupka. His brother Samo Chalupka was also a writer. Chalupka was educated at home, in Ožďany, Levoča, Prešov, Sárospatak and studied in Vienna and Jena. He was a teacher, from 1817 to 1824 a professor at a lyceum in Kežmarok and from 1824 until his death a pastor in Brezno.

Chalupka died on 15 July 1871.

== Works ==
His main contribution into the Slovak literature was in drama. His activities were the impulse for the theatrical life in present-day Slovakia. He wrote mainly dramatic satirical works, where he criticized local patriotism, Magyarization aspects, conservatism, limited life goals etc. His first works were in Czech and Hungarian, but after 1848 he started writing in Slovak and translated originally Czech works into Slovak.

=== Drama ===
Cycle about Kocúrkovo (comedy, "Gotham City"):

- 1830 – Kocourkovo, aneb: Jen abychom v hanbě nezůstali
  - 1832 – Všecko naopak, aneb: Tesnošilova Anička sa žení a Honzík se vydáva
  - 1833 – Trasořitka, anebo: Stará láska se předce dočekala
  - 1835 – Třináctá hodina, aneb: Však se nahledíme, kdo bude hlásníkem v Kocourkově
  - 1837 – Starouš plesnivec anebo Čtyry svadby na jednom pohřebe v Kocourkově
- 1835 – A vén szerelmes, vagy a Tozházi négy völegény
- 1854 – Dobrovoľníci
- 1862 – Huk a Fuk anebo: Prvý apríl
- 1862 – Černokňažník
- 1873 – Juvelír

=== Prose ===
- 1836 – Kocourkovo (a prosaic version)
- 1841 – Bendeguz, Gyula Kolompos und Pista Kurtaforint. Eine Donquixottiade nach der neuesten Mode von P. P.

=== Other ===
- Geschichte der Generalsynoden beider evangelischen Konfessionen in Ungarn vom Jahre 1791 (History of general synods of both Evangelical confessions in Hungary since 1791)
- Schreiben des Grafen Karl Zay, Generalalinspektors der evang. Kirchen und Schulen Augsb. Konf. In Ungarn, an die Prefoessoren zu Leutschau (A letter of Earl Karl Zay, general inspector of evangelical churches and schools of Augsburg confession in Hungary, to professors in Leutschau)
- 1842 – Zpěvník evanjelický aneb Písně duchovní staré i nové
- 1846–47 – Kázně nedělní a svátečné
