= List of railway lines in Slovakia =

Slovakia railway map

This is a list of railway lines in Slovakia.

== Broad gauge railways ==
The whole broad gauge railway network built after World War II. The aim was to establish favorable relationships between the Soviet railway and the ironworks Východoslovenské železiarne. It has served the Ukrainian-Slovakian freight traffic since 1991. The operators are the ŽSR and the UZ.

Nr.	Operator	Start station	End station	Length (km)	Electrification	Current status
500	ŽSR/UZ	Haniska pri Košiciach	(Ukraine) Užhorod	99.7	3000 V DC	only cargo
190	ŽSR/UZ	Čierna nad Tisou	(Ukraine) Chop	8.3	3000 V DC	only cargo

== Normal gauge railways ==
The present list not follow a perfect numeric and alphabetic row, but a logical geographical connection order. Each railway line is listed only once here. Same sections from the different lines (from the timetable) are not repeated. This principle is also valid for tramlines.

Nr.	Operator	Start station	End station	Length (km)	Electrification	Current status
100	ŽSR/ÖBB	Devínska Nová Ves	(Austria) Marchegg	5.9	15 kV 16.7 Hz	active
101	ŽSR/ÖBB	Bratislava-Petržalka	(Austria) Parndorf	24.3	15 kV 16.7 Hz	active
110	ŽSR	Bratislava Hlavná	Kúty	63.7	25 kV 50 Hz	active
110	ŽSR/ČD	Kúty	(Czech Republic) Břeclav	18.4	25 kV 50 Hz	active
112	ŽSR	Zohor	Plavecký Mikuláš	35.0	non-electrified	last train: 15 December 2019
113	ŽSR	Zohor	Záhorská Ves	14.5	non-electrified	last train: 15 December 2019
114	ŽSR	Kúty	Holíč nad Moravou	18.6	25 kV 50 Hz	active
114	ŽSR	Holíč nad Moravou	Skalica na Slovensku	6.6	non-electrified	active
114	ŽSR/ČD	Skalica na Slovensku	(Czech Republic) Sudoměřice nad Moravou	3.0	non-electrified	last train: 9 December 2007
115	ŽSR/ČD	Holíč nad Moravou	(Czech Republic) Hodonín	6.2	25 kV 50 Hz	last train: 13 December 2003
116	ŽSR	Trnava	Kúty	68.3	25 kV 50 Hz	active
117	ŽSR	Jablonica	Brezová pod Bradlom	11.7	non-electrified	last train: 2 February 2003
120	ŽSR	Bratislava Hlavná	Žilina	202.5	25 kV 50 Hz	active
608	ŽSR	Vinohrady junction	Bratislava predmestie	3.5	25 kV 50 Hz	active
610	ŽSR	Bratislava predmestie	Bratislava filiálka	2.8	non-electrified	last train: 20 November 1972
609	ŽSR	Bratislava Hlavná wye (Vajnory – Rača)		4.8	25 kV 50 Hz	only cargo
120K	ŽSR	Nové Mesto nad Váhom wye (Považany–Čachtice)		0.8	25 kV 50 Hz	only cargo
121	ŽSR/ČD	Nové Mesto nad Váhom	(Czech Republic) Veselí nad Moravou	67.4	non-electrified	active
123	ŽSR	Trenčianska Teplá	Nemšová	3.7	non-electrified	active
123	ŽSR/ČD	Nemšová	(Czech Republic) Bylnice	14.7	non-electrified	active
124	ŽSR	Nemšová	Lednické Rovne	17.3	non-electrified	last train: 2 February 2003
125	ŽSR/ČD	Púchov	(Czech Republic) Horní Lideč	27.7	25 kV 50 Hz	active
126	ŽSR	Žilina	Rajec	21.3	non-electrified	active
127	ŽSR	Žilina	Čadca	30.5	3000 V DC	active
127	ŽSR/ČD	Čadca	(Czech Republic) Český Těšín	41.3	3000 V DC	active
128	ŽSR	Čadca	Makov	26.2	non-electrified	active
129	ŽSR/PKP	Čadca	(Poland) Żywiec	57.5	3000 V DC	active
130	ŽSR	Bratislava Hlavná	Štúrovo	135.2	25 kV 50 Hz	active
130	ŽSR/MÁV	Štúrovo	(Hungary) Vác	44.0	25 kV 50 Hz	active
605	ŽSR	Bratislava Vajnory	Bratislava predmestie	1.4	25 kV 50 Hz	only cargo
604	ŽSR	Bratislava predmestie	Bratislava Nové Mesto	2.1	25 kV 50 Hz	active
601	ŽSR	Bratislava Vajnory	Vinohrady junction	2.9	25 kV 50 Hz	only cargo
602	ŽSR	Bratislava východ	Vinohrady junction	3.5	25 kV 50 Hz	only cargo
131	ŽSR	Bratislava Nové Mesto	Komárno	94.9	non-electrified	active
131K	ŽSR	Komárno stop	Komárno Dunaj	1.1	non-electrified	only cargo
132	ŽSR	Bratislava Hlavná	Bratislava-Petržalka	17.7	25 kV 50 Hz	active
132	ŽSR/GySEV	Bratislava-Petržalka	(Hungary) Hegyeshalom	29.7	25 kV 50 Hz	active
132K	ŽSR	Bratislava Ústredná Nákladná	Bratislava Pálenisko	1.9	25 kV 50 Hz	only cargo
133	ŽSR	Galanta	Sereď	12.4	25 kV 50 Hz	active
133	ŽSR	Sereď	Leopoldov	17.0	25 kV 50 Hz	last train: 13 December 2010
133A	ŽSR	Sereď	Trnava	14.2	25 kV 50 Hz	active
134	ŽSR	Šaľa	Neded	18.9	non-electrified	last train: 13 December 2010
135	ŽSR	Nové Zámky	Komárno	28.8	25 kV 50 Hz	active
135	ŽSR/MÁV	Komárno	(Hungary) Komárom	9.6	25 kV 50 Hz	last train: 11 December 2004
136	ŽSR	Komárno	Kolárovo	25.8	non-electrified	last train: 2 February 2003
140	ŽSR	Palárikovo	Šurany	8.2	25 kV 50 Hz	active
140	ŽSR	Šurany	Prievidza	103.4	non-electrified	active
140K	ŽSR	Jelšovce	Zbehy	4.5	non-electrified	active
140L	ŽSR	Prievidza wye (Chrenovec–Prievidza Nákladná)		0.6	non-electrified	only cargo
141	ŽSR	Leopoldov	Lužianky	28.3	non-electrified	active
141B	ŽSR	Dražovce ramp	Kozárovce	51.9	non-electrified	last train: 2 February 2003
142	ŽSR	Zbehy	Radošina	20.2	non-electrified	last train: 2 February 2003
143	ŽSR	Trenčín	Chynorany	48.7	non-electrified	active
144	ŽSR	Prievidza	Nitrianske Pravno	10.9	non-electrified	last train: 8 December 2012
145	ŽSR	Prievidza	Horná Štubňa	38.8	non-electrified	active
150	ŽSR	Nové Zámky	Zvolen Nákladná	121.3	25 kV 50 Hz	active
151	ŽSR	Úľany nad Žitavou	Zlaté Moravce	35.1	non-electrified	active
151	ŽSR	Zlaté Moravce	Topoľčianky	1.8	non-electrified	last train: 1 June 1975
152	ŽSR	Štúrovo	Levice	52.3	non-electrified	active
153	ŽSR	Čata	Šahy	31.5	non-electrified	active
154	ŽSR	Hronská Dúbrava	Banská Štiavnica	19.7	non-electrified	active
155	ŽSR	Zvolen Osobná	Šahy	74.2	non-electrified	last train: 14 December 2025
160	ŽSR	Zvolen Nákladná	Haniska pri Košiciach	217.7	non-electrified	active
160	ŽSR	Haniska pri Košiciach	Košice	10.7	3000 V DC	active
160A	ŽSR/MÁV	Lenartovce	(Hungary) Bánréve	1.6	non-electrified	last train: 13 December 2008
160B	ŽSR/MÁV	Turňa nad Bodvou	(Hungary) Tornanádaska	8.6	non-electrified	Inactive. The last trains were the followings: Turňa nad Bodvou–Hidvégardó 8 May 1945, Hidvégardó–Tornanádaska 7 February 1966.
160K	ŽSR	Barca wye (Krásna nad Hornádom – Haniska pri Košiciach)		2.2	3000 V DC	only cargo
161	ŽSR/MÁV	Lučenec	(Hungary) Nógrádszakál	25.2	non-electrified	Inactive. The last trains were the followings: Lučenec–Kalonda 2 February 2003, Kalonda–Ipolytarnóc 31 May 1992, Ipolytarnóc–Nógrádszakál 9 June 2023.
161	MÁV/ ŽSR	(Hungary) Nógrádszakál	Veľký Krtíš	16.3	non-electrified	last train: 31 May 1992
162	ŽSR	Lučenec	Utekáč	41.2	non-electrified	active
163	ŽSR	Breznička	Katarínska Huta	9.8	non-electrified	last train: 2 February 2003
164	ŽSR	Fiľakovo junction	Fiľakovo	0.6	non-electrified	active
164	ŽSR/MÁV	Fiľakovo	(Hungary) Somoskőújfalu	13.2	non-electrified	last train: 1 May 2011
164A	ŽSR	Fiľakovo	Urbánka junction	3.5	non-electrified	only cargo
165	ŽSR	Plešivec	Muráň	40.9	non-electrified	last train: 1 May 2011
166	ŽSR	Plešivec	Slavošovce	23.8	non-electrified	last train: 2 February 2003
167	ŽSR	Rožňava	Dobšiná	26.1	non-electrified	last train: 2 February 2003
168	ŽSR	Moldava nad Bodvou	Moldava nad Bodvou mesto	0.8	non-electrified	active
168	ŽSR	Moldava nad Bodvou mesto	Medzev	14.6	non-electrified	last train: 2 February 2003
169	ŽSR/MÁV	Barca	(Hungary) Hidasnémeti	21.5	3000 V DC	active
170	ŽSR	Zvolen Osobná	Banská Bystrica	21.6	25 kV 50 Hz	active
170	ŽSR	Banská Bystrica	Diviaky	46.0	non-electrified	active
170K	ŽSR	Zvolen wye (Zvolen Nákladná–Zvolen mesto)		1.2	25 kV 50 Hz	only cargo
171	ŽSR	Hronská Dúbrava	Martin	78.6	non-electrified	active
171	ŽSR	Martin	Vrútky	6.5	3000 V DC	active
171K	ŽSR	Vrútky wye (Vrútky Nákladná–Martin)		1.3	3000 V DC	only cargo
172	ŽSR	Banská Bystrica	Brezno	42.8	non-electrified	active
302	ŽSR	Chvatimech	Hronec	1.4	non-electrified	last train: 31 May 1964
173	ŽSR	Brezno	Margecany	136.1	non-electrified	active
173K	ŽSR	Margecany wye (Jaklovce–Ružín)		0.7	non-electrified	inactive
174	ŽSR	Brezno	Jesenské	77.7	non-electrified	active
180	ŽSR	Košice	Nezbudská Lúčka-Strečno	227.2	3000 V DC	active
180	ŽSR	Nezbudská Lúčka-Strečno	Žilina	11.6	25 kV 50 Hz	active
180K	ŽSR	Kysak wye (Obišovce–Veľká Lodina)		1.0	3000 V DC	active
180L	ŽSR	Žilina Zriaďovacia	Žilina	1.0	25 kV 50 Hz	only cargo
181	ŽSR	Kraľovany	Trstená	56.6	non-electrified	active
185	ŽSR	Poprad-Tatry	Plaveč	60.7	non-electrified	active
185A	ŽSR	Studený Potok	Tatranská Lomnica	8.9	non-electrified	active
303	ŽSR	Krížová Ves	Spišská Belá	2.6	non-electrified	last train: 3 June 1956
186	ŽSR	Spišská Nová Ves	Levoča	12.7	non-electrified	last train: 11 December 2022
187	ŽSR	Spišské Vlachy	Spišské Podhradie	9.2	non-electrified	last train: 9 December 2012
188	ŽSR	Kysak	Plaveč	70.5	3000 V DC	active
188	ŽSR/PKP	Plaveč	(Poland) Muszyna	14.3	3000 V DC	active
188K	ŽSR	Plaveč wye (Pusté Pole–Orlov)		1.3	3000 V DC	only cargo
190	ŽSR	Košice	Slovenské Nové Mesto	61.8	3000 V DC	active
190	ŽSR/UZ	Slovenské Nové Mesto	(Ukraine) Chop	41.9	3000 V DC	active
190	ŽSR	Trebišov	Slivník junction	16.2	3000 V DC	active
190K	ŽSR	Michaľany wye (Kuzmice–Lastovce)		0.7	3000 V DC	only cargo
190B	ŽSR/MÁV	Slovenské Nové Mesto	(Hungary) Sátoraljaújhely	1.7	non-electrified	last train: 13 December 2008
191	ŽSR	Michaľany	Humenné	64.5	3000 V DC	active
191	ŽSR	Humenné	Medzilaborce mesto	42.4	non-electrified	active
191	ŽSR/PKP	Medzilaborce mesto	(Poland) Zagórz	59.5	non-electrified	Inactive. The last trains were the followings: Medzilaborce mesto–Łupków 14 December 2025, Łupków–Zagórz 30 April 2016.
191K	ŽSR	Bánovce nad Ondavou wye (Laškovce–Hatalov)		0.9	3000 V DC	only cargo
191L	ŽSR	Strážske wye (Pusté Čemerné–Nižný Hrabovec)		1.2	non-electrified	inactive
192	ŽSR	Trebišov	Vranov nad Topľou	31.9	non-electrified	last train: 2 February 2003
193	ŽSR	Prešov	Strážske	60.4	non-electrified	active
194	ŽSR	Kapušany pri Prešove	Bardejov	34.6	non-electrified	active
195	ŽSR	Bánovce nad Ondavou	Veľké Kapušany	29.0	3000 V DC	last train: 12 December 2021
195	ŽSR/UZ	Veľké Kapušany	(Ukraine) Baťovo	48.2	3000 V DC	inactive
196	ŽSR	Humenné	Stakčín	26.7	non-electrified	active
200	DPB	Bratislava Centrum	Jungmannova	2.3	600 V DC	inactive
201	DPMK	Havlíčkova	Važecká	11.7	600 V DC	active
202	DPMK	Staničné námestie	Šaca U. S. Steel	14.0	600 V DC	active
203	DPMK	Barca Statue of John Paul II.	Námestie Osloboditeľov	4.3	600 V DC	active
204	DPMK	Dom umenia	Námestie Maratónu Mieru	1.1	600 V DC	active
204A	DPMK	Námestie Maratónu Mieru	Námestie Osloboditeľov	1.1	600 V DC	inactive, across the Main Square
205	DPMK	Radnica Starého mesta	Botanická záhrada	1.0	600 V DC	active
Nr.	Operator	Start station	End station	Length (km)	Electrification	Current status

Operated by ŽSR
Tram lines

== Narrow gauge railways ==
Most railways have a track gauge of 1,000 mm (3 ft 3 3/8 in), but few of them 760 mm (2 ft 5 15/16 in).

Nr.	Operator	Start station	End station	Length (km)	Electrification	Track gauge	Current status
122	TREŽ	Trenčianska Teplá ŽSR station	Trenčianske Teplice	5.4	600 V DC	760 mm	last train in 2025
182	TEŽ	Štrba ŽSR station	Štrbské Pleso	4.6	1500 V DC	1000 mm	active, cog-wheel
183	TEŽ	Poprad-Tatry ŽSR station	Štrbské Pleso	29.0	1500 V DC	1000 mm	active
184	TEŽ	Tatranská Lomnica ŽSR station	Starý Smokovec	5.9	1500 V DC	1000 mm	active
203	TMR	Starý Smokovec	Hrebienok	1.9	electrified	1000 mm	active, funicular
700	DPB	Rača Komisárky	Bratislava Centrum	9.5	600 V DC	1000 mm	active
701	DPB	Petržalka Južné mesto	Kapucínska Street	6.4	600 V DC	1000 mm	active
702	DPB	Dúbravka Pri kríži	Bratislava Centrum	10.3	600 V DC	1000 mm	active
702A	DPB	Ľudovít Štúr Square	Šafárikovo námestie	0.6	600 V DC	1000 mm	active
703	DPB	Americké námestie	Zlaté piesky	6.7	600 V DC	1000 mm	active
704	DPB	Kuchajda	Nové Mesto ŽSR station	0.3	600 V DC	1000 mm	active
705	DPB	Trnavské mýto	Ružinov Astornomická	3.9	600 V DC	1000 mm	active
706	DPB	Blumentál	Kráľovské údolie	2.5	600 V DC	1000 mm	active
707	DPB	Račianske mýto	Krížna street	0.3	600 V DC	1000 mm	active
708	DPB	Hlavná stanica	University of Technology	1.0	600 V DC	1000 mm	active
900	ČHŽ	Chvatimech ŽSR station	Šánske	7.7	non-electrified	760 mm	only cargo
900	ČHŽ	Šánske	Čierny Balog	4.3	non-electrified	760 mm	active
901	ČHŽ	Čierny Balog	Vydrovo-Konečná	3.6	non-electrified	760 mm	active
902	ČHŽ	Čierny Balog	Dobroč	3.4	non-electrified	760 mm	active
906	DPMK	Čermeľ	Alpinka	3.8	non-electrified	1000 mm	active, children's railway
907	SPM	Nitra brána	Skanzen	2.6	non-electrified	760 mm	active, museum's railway
908	HLÚŽ	Kubátkovia	Sedlo Beskydu	7.7	non-electrified	760 mm	active
909	OLŽ	Sedlo Beskydu	Tanečník	7.0	non-electrified	760 mm	active

Forest railways
Tram lines
Special railways

== See also ==
- Železničná spoločnosť Slovensko (ZSSK)
- Railways of the Slovak Republic (ŽSR)
- Trams in Bratislava
- Trams in Košice
- Trams in Trenčianske Teplice
