= Zvolen–Čata railway =

Zvolen– Krupina–Šahy–Čata railway
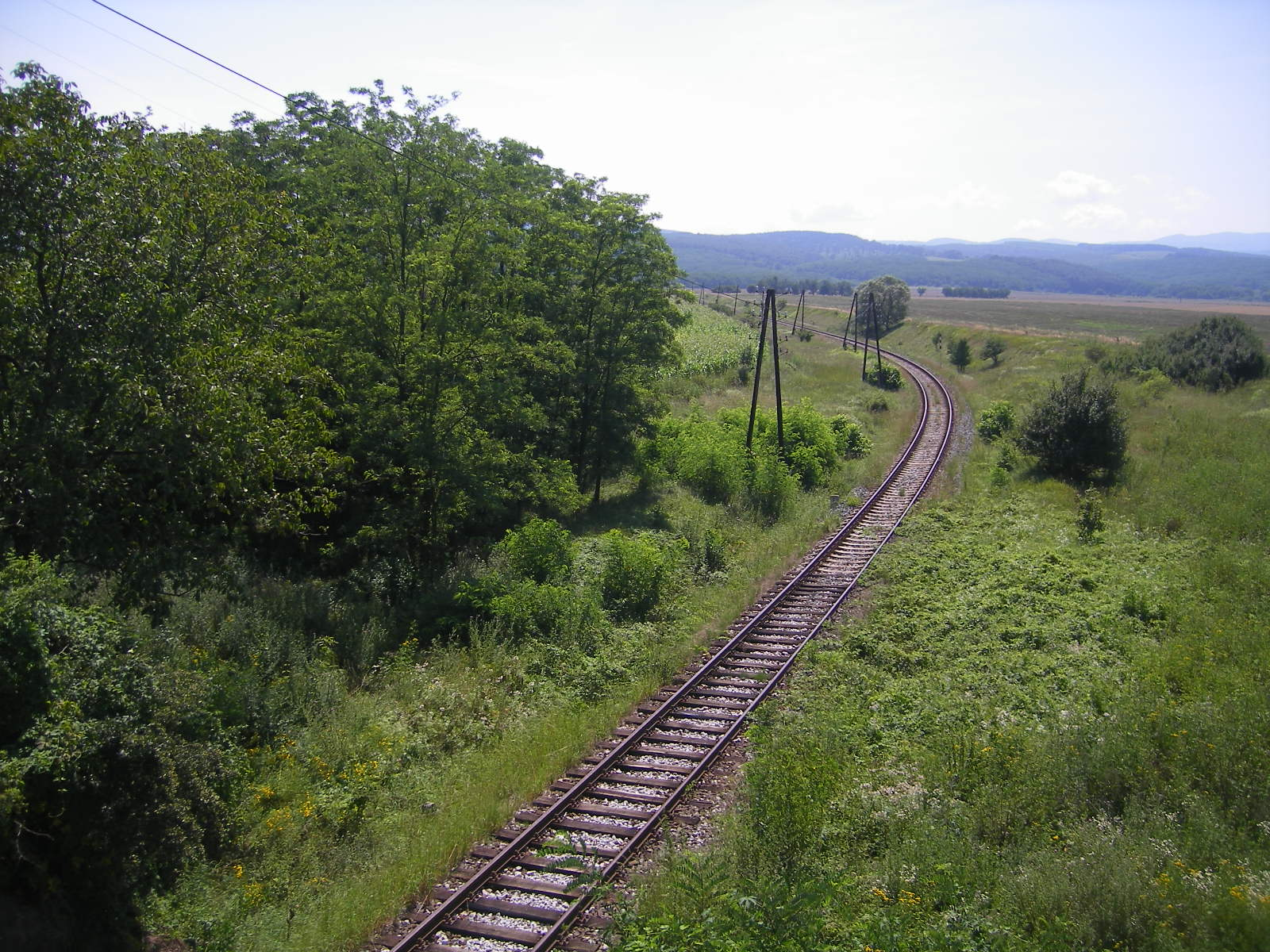
- Panorama of the railway West from Šahy

Overview
- Locale: Slovakia
- Termini: Zvolen osobná stanica; Čata

Service
- Route number: 153

History
- Opened: 1891

Technical
- Line length: 106 km (66 mi)
- Track gauge: 1,435 mm (4 ft 8 1/2 in) standard gauge
- Operating speed: 80 km/h (50 mph)

Zvolen–Krupina–Šahy–Čata railway is a railway line in Slovakia.

== History ==
Railway between Csata and Balassagyarmat was built in 1891 by a former subsidiary of MÁV, called Garam–Ipolyvölgyi MÁV-HÉV. It reached Ipeľ at Homok (today part of Šahy). There was built a new branch line in 1898-199 between Ipolyság and Korpona. As the newly founded Czechoslovakia needed the railway line, the border with Hungary was moved to the left bank of Ipel instead of the Ipel at all.

Czechoslovakia extended the branch line in 1923-1925 up to Zvolen. There are tunnels as well in the new part of the line.

Because of defending reasons part in Hungary was demolished in 1963. It was a 6.3 km (3.9 mi) long part between Drégelypalánk and the border.

In 2003 passenger transport between Šahy and Čata was cancelled and then restarted in 2019

== Images ==
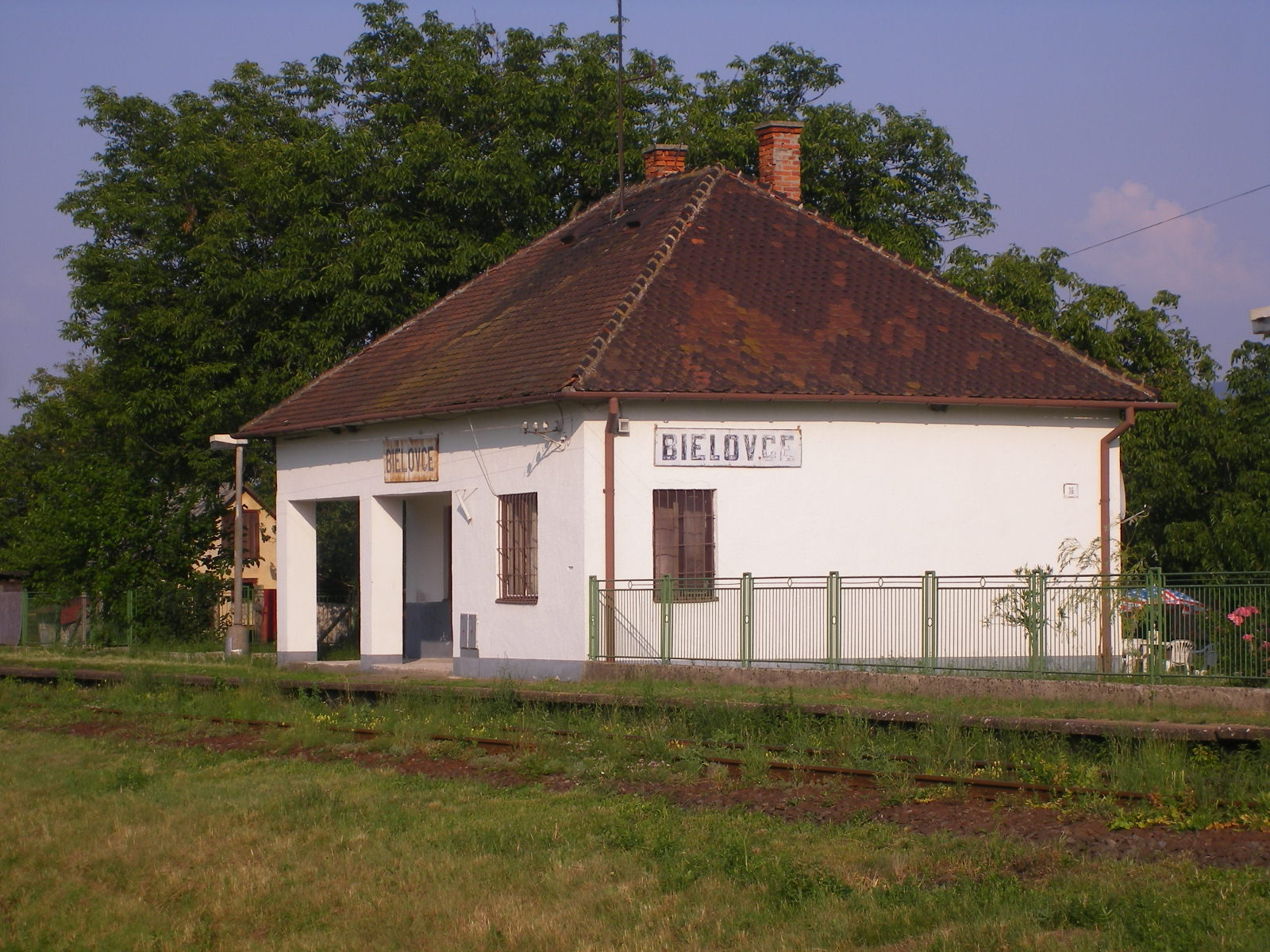
Stop at Bielovce

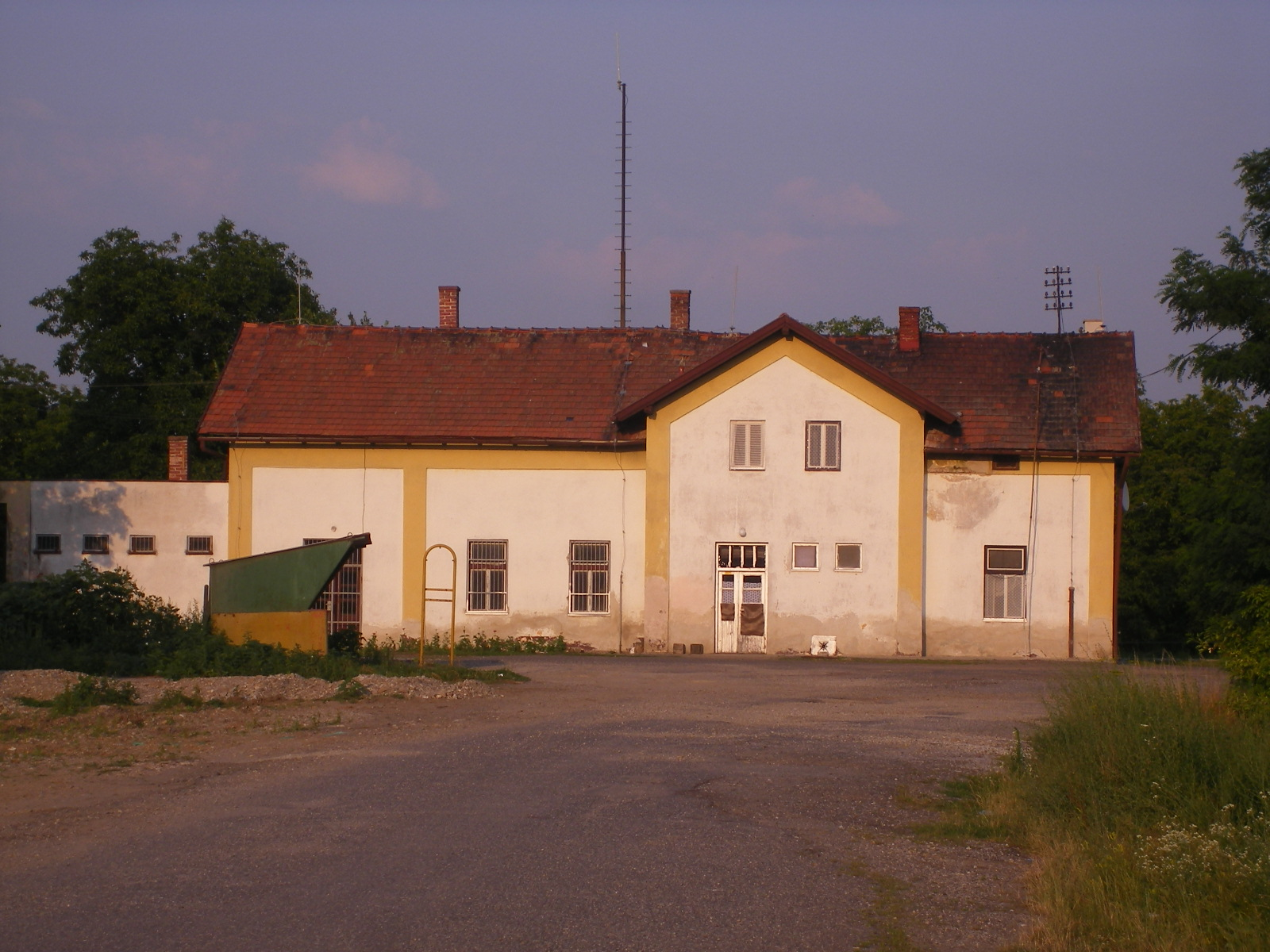
Stop at Ipeľský Sokolec

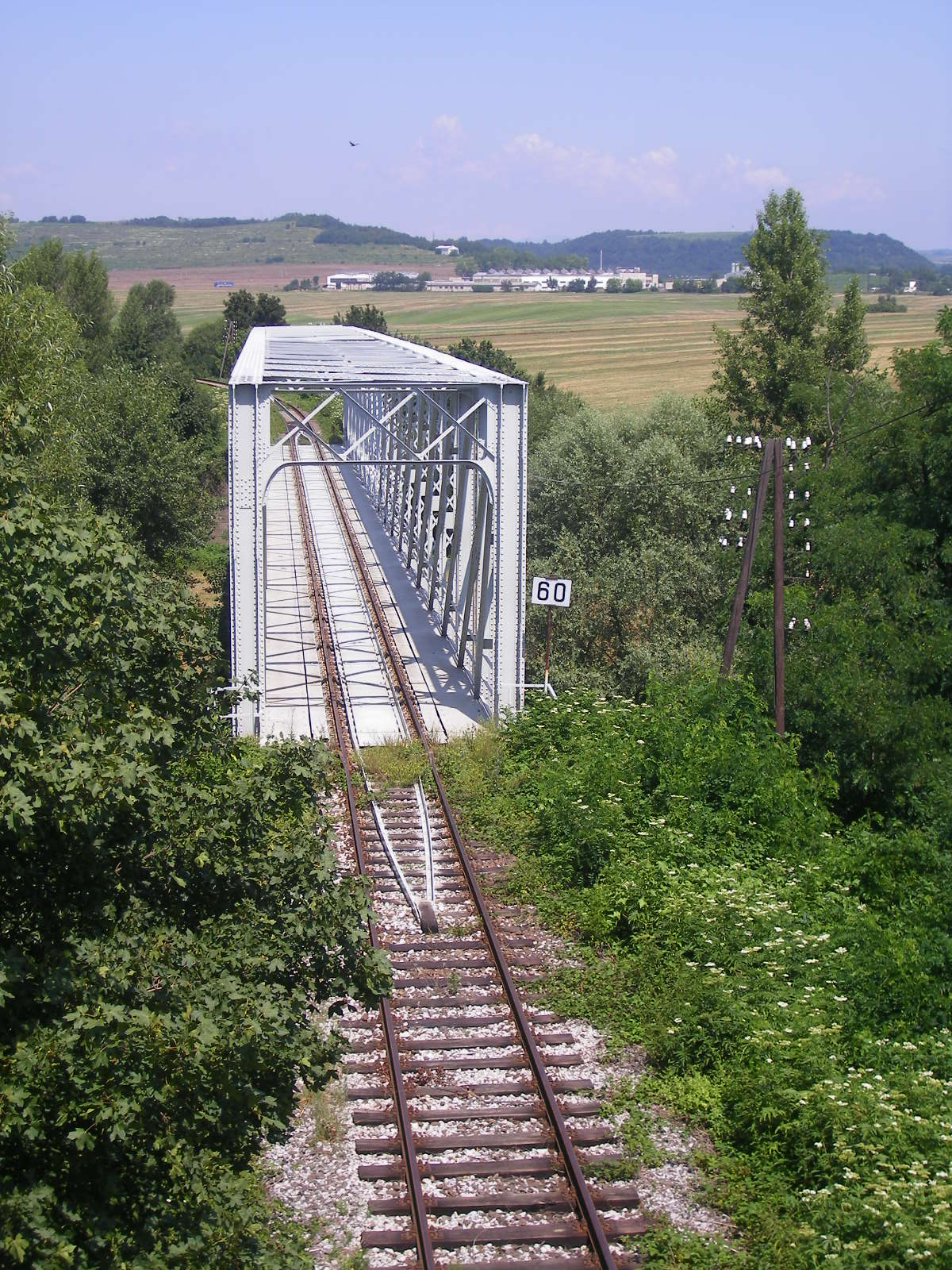
Railway bridge between Šahy and Hrkovce
