= Karol Dembovský =

Slovak politician and publicist (1885–1907)

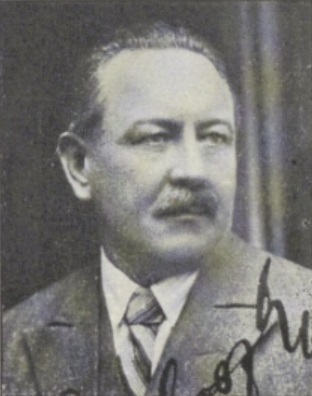

Member of the National Assembly of Czechoslovakia
- In office 1935–1939

Personal details
- Born: 1 October 1885 Haniska, Austria-Hungary
- Died: 17 January 1962 (aged 76) Trenčín, Czechoslovakia
- Party: Slovak People's Party
- Occupation: Politician, publicist

Karol Dembovský (1 October 1885 – 17 January 1962) was a Slovak politician and publicist. He was prominent politician of the Hlinka Slovak People's Party during the interwar period in Czechoslovakia and the wartime Slovak Republic.

== Biography ==
Dembovský was born on 1 October 1885 in Haniska, Austria-Hungary⁣ (today Slovakia). In the first half of the 20th century, he was one of the important representatives of the Christian peasant association in Slovakia. In interwar Czechoslovakia, he was also involved in the Union of Private Officials of Slovakia and Subcarpathian Rus, where he served as vice-president.

In the parliamentary elections of 1935 he was elected to the National Assembly as a deputy for the Autonomist Bloc (a formation formed by the HSĽS with the SNS, AZS and PS). He was a candidate in the XVII electoral region based in Turčianske Svätý Martin. He was the manager of the power plant in Trenčianska Teplá. In the Chamber of Deputies, he served on the budget committee.

He was also politically active during the wartime Slovak Republic. From 1938/1939 to 1943, he was a government commissioner (practically a mayoral function) of the municipality of Trenčianska Teplá, and he also served as vice-chairman of the Slovak Trade Union of Private Clerks.

Dombovský died on 17 January 1962 in Trenčín, at the age of 76.
