= Public transport in Košice =

Public transport overview of Košice, Slovakia

Košice Transit Company Dopravný podnik mesta Košice
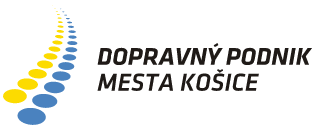

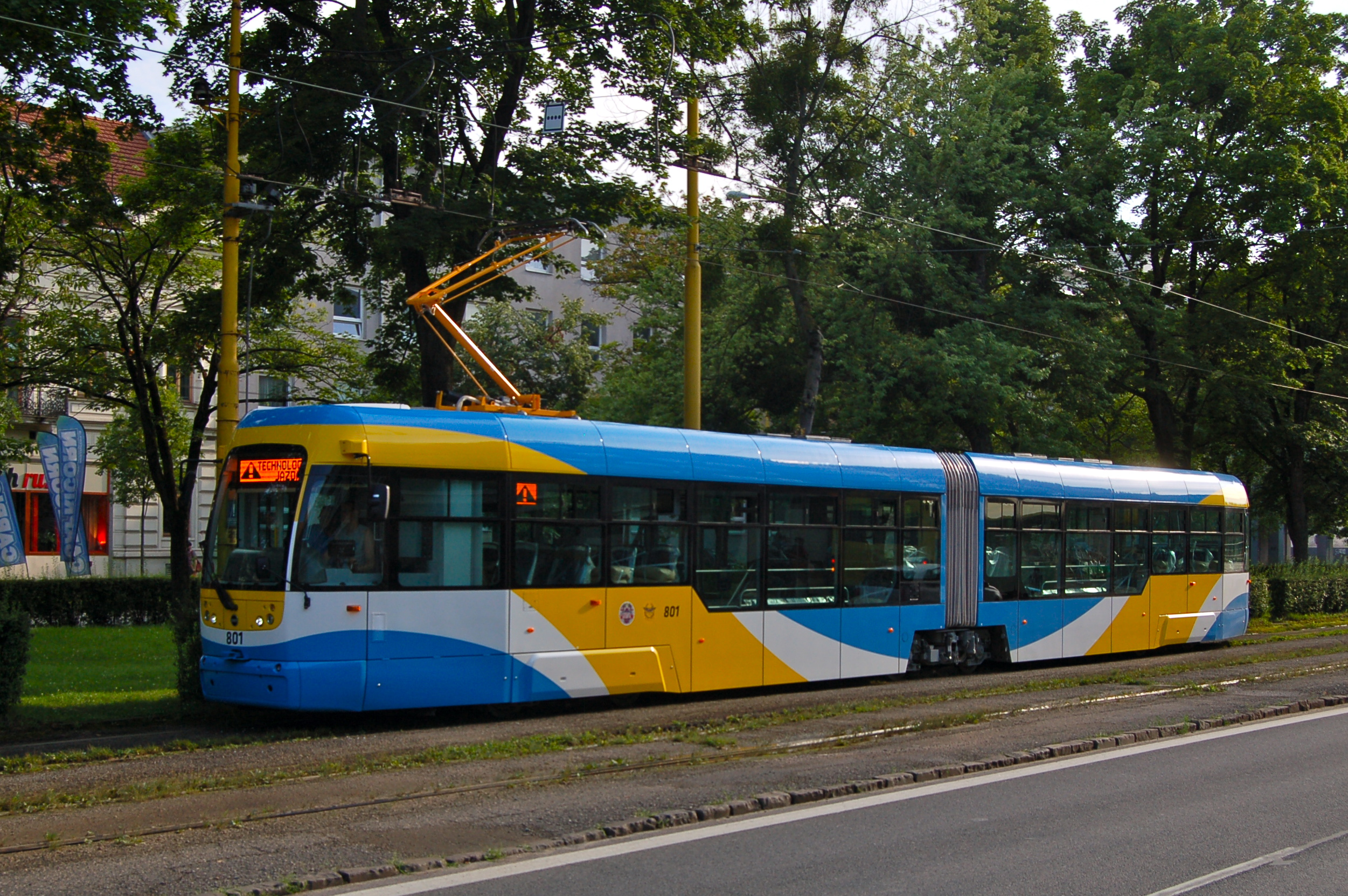
- New Vario LF2 plus tram with city colors

Overview
- Locale: Košice, Slovakia
- Transit type: Tram and bus
- Number of lines: 65
- Headquarters: Bardejovská 6
- Website: dpmk.sk

Operation
- Began operation: 25 May 1994
- Operator: City of Košice

Technical
- System length: Length of all lines: Trams: 177 km (110 mi); Buses: 743.1 km (461.7 mi); Trolleybuses: 25.1 km (15.6 mi)

The Košice public transit system operates in Košice, Slovakia; services are managed by the Košice Transit Company (Slovak: Dopravný podnik mesta Košice (DPMK)).

== History ==
The Košice transit company was founded in 1891 by Stefan Popper, who built the first track for a horse-drawn tramway. The company had the Magyar name Kassai Közúti Vasút – KKK ("Košice Street Railway"). In 1914, all tram tracks were electrified and the transit company was renamed as Kassai Villamos Közúti Vasút (English "Košice electric tramway lines").

The tram system was destroyed in World War I and again in World War II. In 1945, at the end of hostilities, the system was rebuilt again. Nowadays, the public transport company is called Dopravný podnik mesta Košice ("Transit Company of the City of Košice").

== System ==
Košice tram and trolley map

The Košice public transit system includes trams, buses, and trolleybuses. There are 16 tram lines, 41 bus routes and 7 night bus routes. While there are 2 trolleybus lines, they do not currently see regular service. As of 2021, trams line covered a total length of 178 km and bus routes covered a total length of 682.8 km. The system extends from the city center to industrial areas and outlying villages near the city.

== Fares ==
The fare has changed over the years, costing 6 SKK for students and children less than 15 years of age, and 12 SKK for people 15 years and older as of 2008. Slovakia adopted the euro in 2009. In 2010, the tickets cost €0,25 for students, and children less than 15 years of age, and €0,55 for people 15 years and older. In 2019, a strike caused tickets to become more expensive. As of 2020, tickets cost €0.90 for adults 15 to 62 years of age, and €0.45 for children and adults over 62 years of age.

All travellers must have a valid travel ticket. Passengers older than 70 years, handicapped people, and members of parliament travel for free. Tickets are single-use and time-limited to a particular day, week, or month, though students have concessions to this requirement. Contactless smart cards issued by most Slovak public transport companies are accepted. Passengers using them can obtain tickets at lowered prices upon boarding in card validators. Virtual tickets, available from a range of third-party applications, were made available in 2021. Virtual tickets and contactless cards offer season tickets for one, three, six and twelve months. Cards, which are not time-limited, are available to employees. Tickets can also be bought using SMS for €1.10 .

== Vehicles ==
=== Trams ===
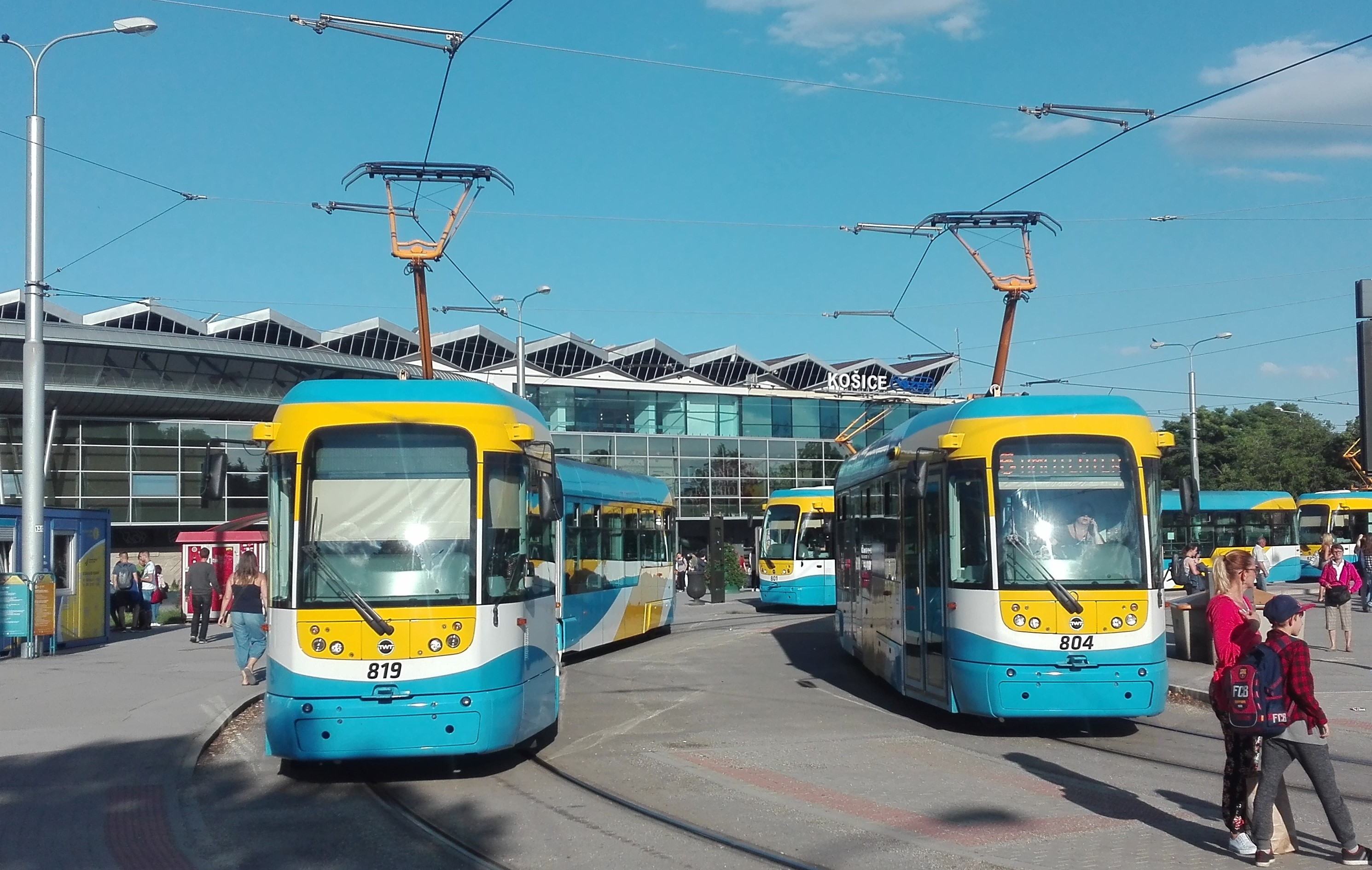
The Vario LF2 trams in front of Košice Railway station

==== In use ====
- T6A5 (manufactured 1991–1992): 11 are still in use, one was retired after crashing into a truck in 2009. Passengers were non-fatally injured and the tram was badly damaged in front.
- KT8D5 (manufactured 1986–1991): 8 are still in use.
- KT8D5R.N2 is a modification of the KT8D5 with a low-floor middle carriage, and was carried out between 2003 and 2009. 8 are still in use.
- Pragoimex Vario LFR.S 1 entered service in 2011 and is still in use.
- Pragoimex Vario LF2+ 33 went into service in 2014/15 and 13 in 2017/2018. All 46 are still in use.

==== Retired ====
- T3SUCS (manufactured between 1963 and 1989): one is still used by DPMK. It is a technical tram, and many were retired or sent to other cities. The last remaining tram in Košice no longer takes passengers.

=== Buses ===
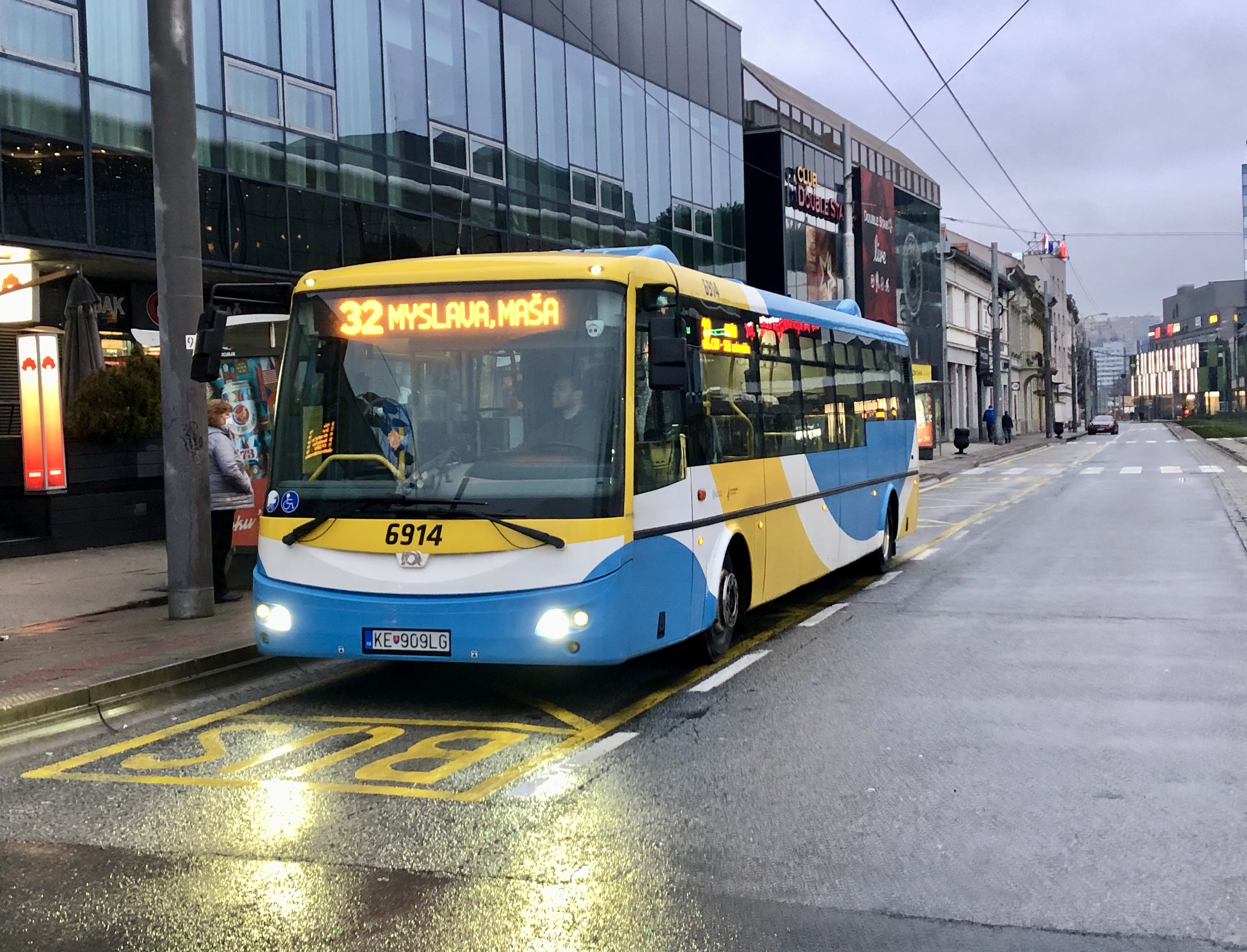
Public bus in Košice

==== In use ====
- Solaris Urbino 15 35 entered service between 2000 and 2004. 9 are still in use.
- Solaris Urbino 12 1 entered service in 2003 and 2 in 2004. 1 is still in use.
- Solaris New Urbino 12 15 entered service in 2021. All 15 are still in use.
- Iveco First FCLLI 1 entered service in 2010 and 1 in 2011. Both are still in use.
- SOR NB 12 City 61 entered service in 2014. 2 of them are retired now, 59 are still in use.
- SOR NB 18 City 56 entered service in 2014 and 9 in 2018. 2 of them were retire due to a fire, 63 are still in use.
- SOR BN 9,5 5 entered service in 2014. All 5 are still in use.
- SOR EBN 10.5 5 entered service in 2014. All 5 are still in use.
- SOR EBN 11 9 entered service in 2016 and 9 in 2018. All 18 are still in use.

==== Retired ====
- Karosa (manufactured between 1994 and 2005 by Iveco): these buses were diesel or CNG powered. All models – the C734, C744, B731, B732, B741, B932, and B941 – were retired from 2013 to 2014.

- One Karosa B 952, #5244, is used as a training vehicle.

Irisbus Citelis 18M - entered service in 2009, last one was retired in September 2024

- Novoplan C12 (manufactured in 2002): all 3 are retired.
- Ikarus (manufactured between 1989 and 1997 by Ikarus Bus): all three models – the Ikarus 280, Ikarus 415, and Ikarus 435 – were retired.

- One Ikarus 280, #4082, has been preserved as a historic vehicle.

- TEDOM C 12 G 19 entered service in 2007/2008 – last 3 buses were retired in 2023

==== Night bus ====
The city is served by seven night bus lines numbered N1 to N7 from 23:10 to 04:30. Night services run at an hourly interval, and during the nights before a working day, the interval after 01:00 is extended to 90 minutes. The buses depart from Staničné námestie ("Station Square") in the centre of Košice.

=== Trolleybuses ===
In 2015, the city underwent a mass track reconstruction which resulted in the temporary stoppage of these services. The Škoda 14TrM returned to service in 2018, and it traveled on Sundays until early 2020. DPMK also refurbished a Škoda 15Tr which restarted service on 22 June 2019 for "trolleybus day", alongside a second Škoda 15Tr that was refurbished by volunteers in cooperation with Československý Dopravák. A special route was followed that took passengers to the "trolleybus cemetery", where trolleybuses in 2015 or earlier were discarded.

==== In use ====
- Škoda 15Tr 15 entered service in 1993 and 1 in 2019. 2 remain but do not see regular use.
- Škoda 14TrM 7 entered service in 1999. 1 remains but does not see regular use.

==== Retired ====
- Škoda 15TrM 5 entered service in 1999.

== See also ==
- Košice railway station
- Transport in Slovakia
