= Štúrovo–Čata–Levice railway =

Railway line in Slovakia

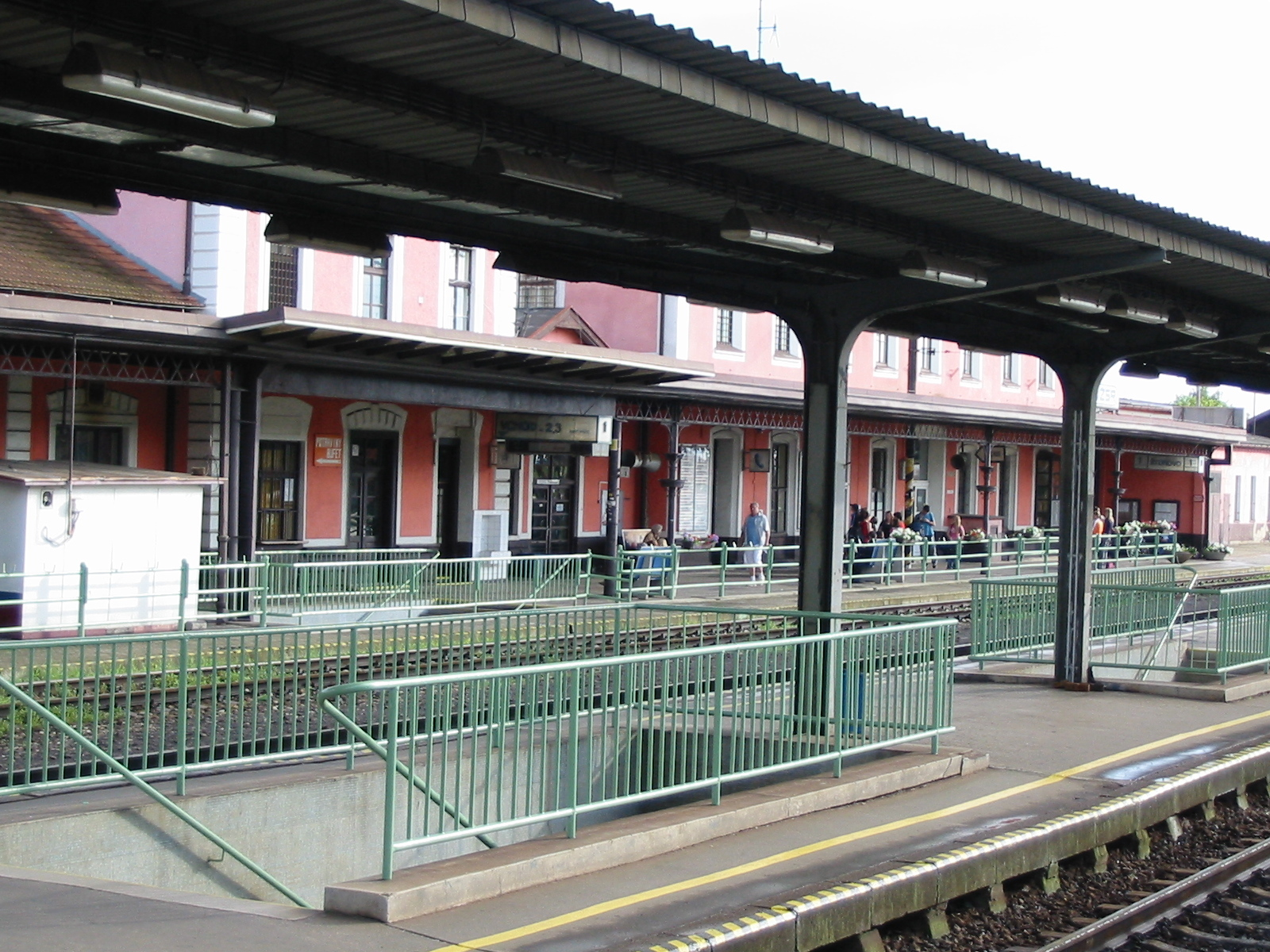
- Štúrovo station

Overview
- Locale: Slovakia
- Termini: Levice; Štúrovo

Service
- Route number: 152

History
- Opened: 1 June 1885 Párkány-Čata; 18 September 1887 Čata-Levice

Technical
- Line length: 52 km (32 mi)
- Track gauge: 1,435 mm (4 ft 8 1/2 in) standard gauge
- Operating speed: 80 km/h (50 mph)

Štúrovo–Čata–Levice railway is a railway line in Southern Slovakia. It runs from North to South more or less parallel with Hron. It is a single track without electrification.

== To the end of WWI ==
It was built by a subsidiary of MÁV, called Garam-Ipolyvölgyi MÁV-HÉV. It had a connection at Párkány to the Budapest–Érsekújvár–Pozsony–Marchegg-railway. The first, 20 km-long (12 mi) part of it between Párkány and Csata was opened on 1 June 1885. The second part between Csata and Léva was opened on 18 September 1887. As a consequence of the Treaty of Trianon, the line was transferred to the newly founded Czechoslovakia.

== Station on the line ==
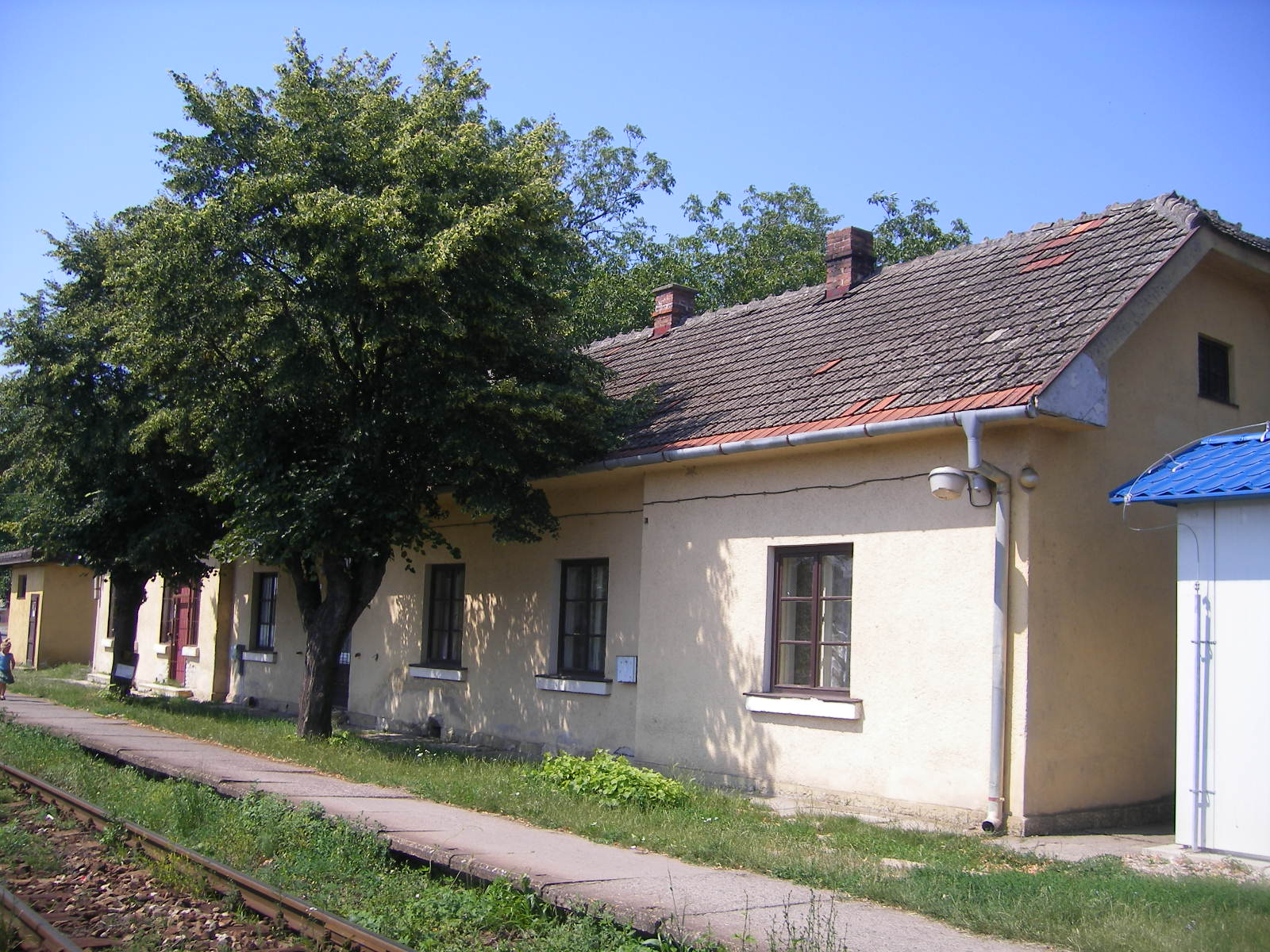
Kamenín

== Eyternal links ==
- "A vasútvonal adatai". Vlaky.net (in Slovak).
- "Az állomások képei". Vasútállomások.hu (in Hungarian).
