= SOR EBN 10,5 =

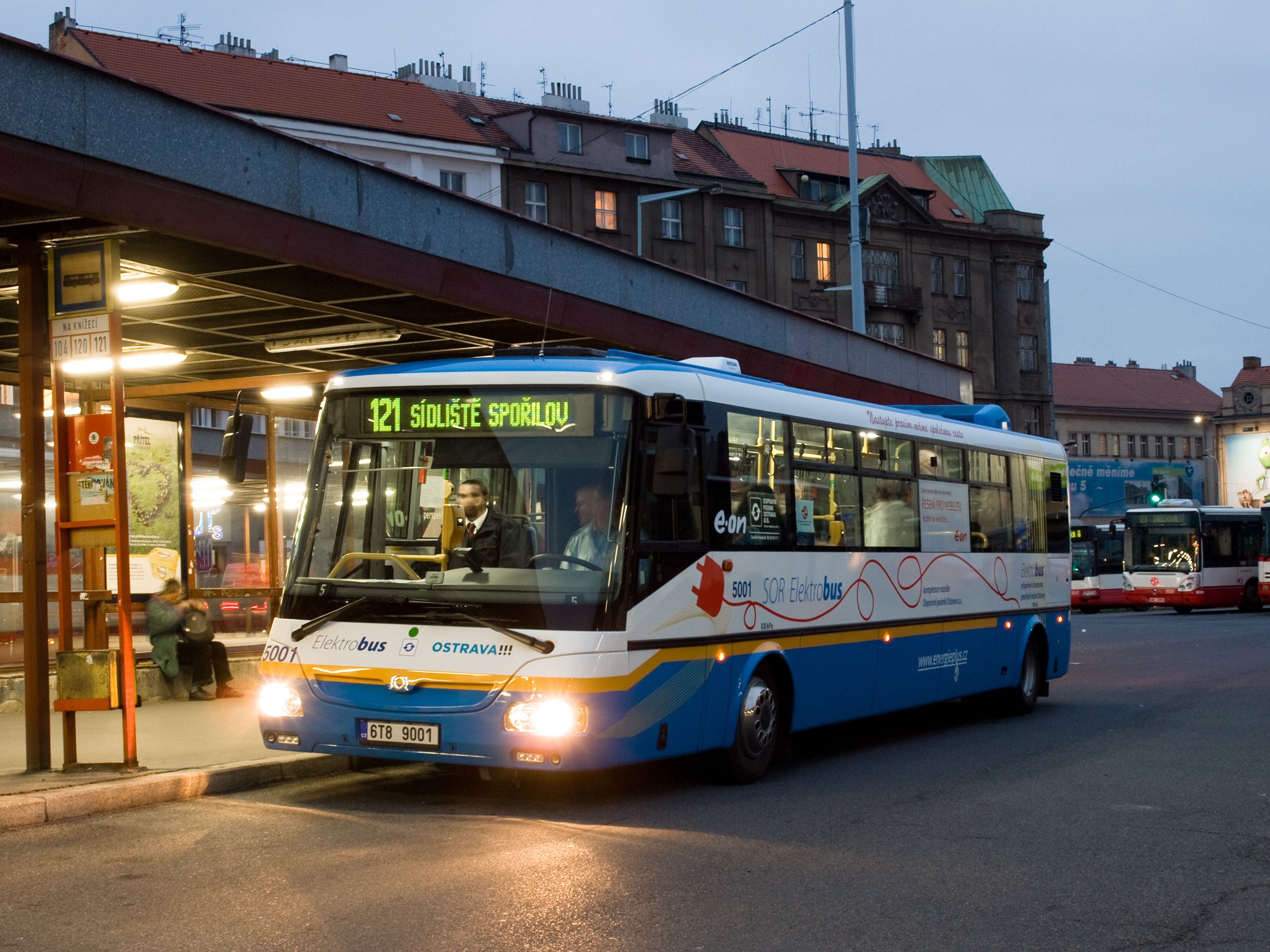
- SOR EBN 10,5 in Prague, Czech Republic

Overview
- Manufacturer: SOR

Body and chassis
- Doors: 3
- Floor type: Low-entry

Powertrain
- Engine: Pragoimex TAM 1052C6B electric engine
- Power output: 120 kW (161 hp)

Dimensions
- Length: 10,370 mm (408.3 in)
- Width: 2,525 mm (99.4 in)
- Height: 2,800 mm (110.2 in)
- Curb weight: 10,100 kg (22,300 lb)

SOR EBN 10,5 is an electric bus produced since 2010 by Czech bus manufacturer SOR. Its development was initiated in late 2008 and 2009, with a supplier of electrical equipment, Cegelec, which further uses subcontractors.

== Design ==
Elektrobus is based on a city bus SOR BN 12, from which it took over from the chassis shortened by about 1.5 m rear overhang. The vehicle has two axles and three doors, its length is 10 370 mm and a width of 2 525 mm. The bus battery (180 lithium-ion cells with a total capacity of 300 Ah) lasts up to 110-180 kilometers away and recharges from the mains voltage of 400 volts and can be recharged full cycle for 8 hours or shortened so "quick" for 4 hours. Recharging of the bus may take less time and can be modified even runway turn pads.

== See also ==
- List of buses
