= Lučenec–Kalonda–Veľký Krtíš railway =

Railway line in Hungary and Slovakia

Lučenec–Kalonda–Veľký Krtíš- railway
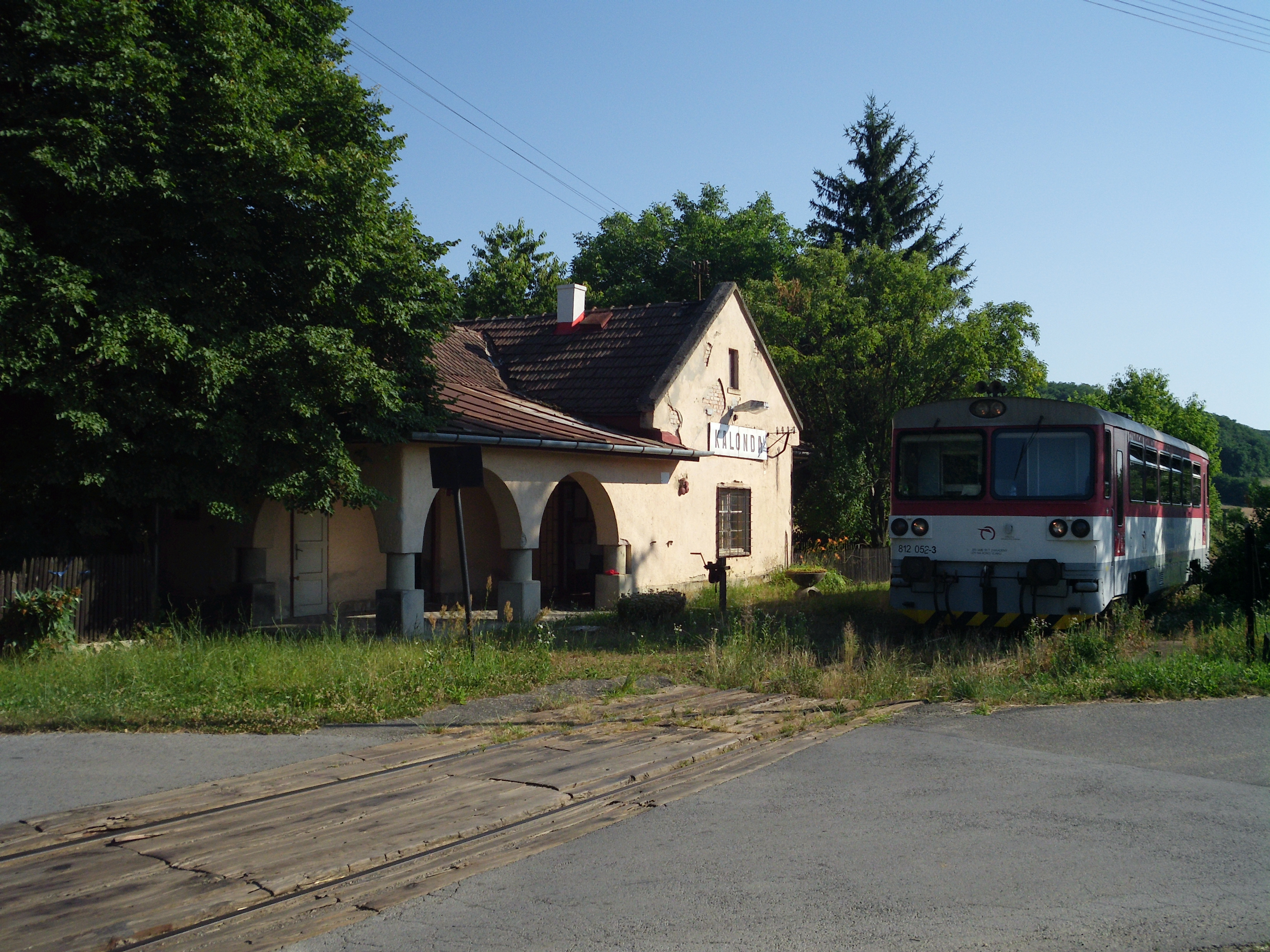
- Tourist train at a former stop in Kalonda in 2015

Service
- Route number: 161

Technical
- Line length: 41 km
- Track gauge: 1435 mm
- Operating speed: 60 km/h max.

Lučenec–Kalonda–Veľký Krtíš railway is a railway line on the Southern part of Slovakia. It is a corridor line with Hungary. It uses part of MÁV’s Line 78 between Ipolytarnóc and Nógrádszakál. It is signed as No 161 in the Slovak railway system. Only freight trains use the line up to Veľký Krtíš. As of 2013 there is no passenger transport in the Slovak part of the line.
