= Trams in Trenčianske Teplice =

Tram network in Trenčianske Teplice, Slovakia

Trenčianska Teplá – Trenčianske Teplice
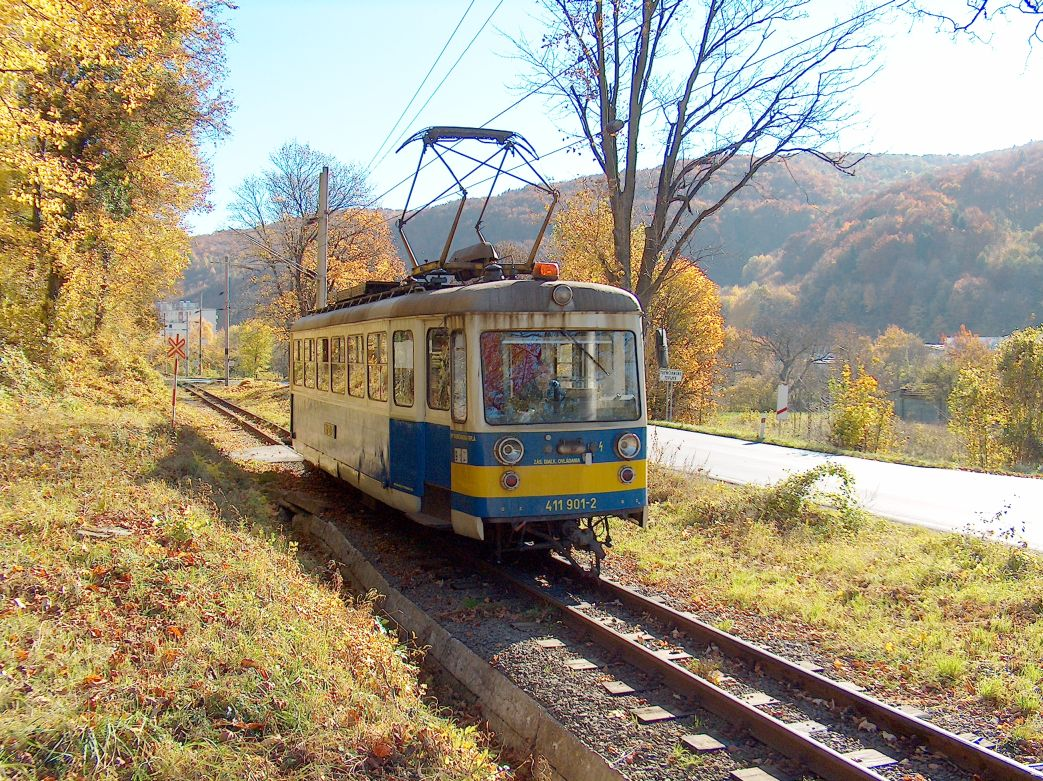

Operation
- Locale: Trenčianska Teplá and Trenčianske Teplice, Slovakia
- Open: 1904
- Status: Operational
- Routes: 1
- Operator: ŽSR

Infrastructure
- Track gauge: 760 mm (2 ft 5 15/16 in)
- Electrification: 600 V DC

Statistics
- Track length (single): 5,427 km (3,372 mi)
- Website: http://www.trez.sk TREZ

Trenčín Electric Railway (TREŽ) is the name of the Slovak 760 mm (2 ft 5 15/16 in) narrow-gauge rail transport line between Trenčianska Teplá and the town of Trenčianske Teplice with tram vehicles operating on the track. It is approximately 5.5 km long and consists of one inter-station section, while the only crossover called Kaňová was abolished in the second half of the 1990s.

== Operation ==
=== History ===
The line was put into operation on 27 June 1909 after less than a year of construction. It became a junction of the main railway line from Bratislava to Košice (5th TEN-T Corridor) and the spa town of Trenčianske Teplice.

The system was built as a narrow gauge 760 mm (2 ft 5 15/16 in) railway and is electrified. The supply voltage started at 750 V, and in 1942 it was increased to 950 V. In 1984, it was reduced to 600 V. In 2000, the whole line was modernized, but currently, the operation on this line is provided by the non-profit organization TREŽ, n.o.

The peculiarity of this track is that to this day, for example, the wooden masts on the traction line have been preserved. The track is oldest traction line in Central and Eastern Europe.

=== Future ===
Since the beginning of the 21st century, the whole system is constantly undermined by the possibility of the line being decommissioned, which has so far been delayed. On 8 March 2013, the municipality of Trenčianska Teplá founded the non-profit organization Trenčianska Electric Railway, n.o. (TREŽ), which started to operate the same year.

Only one nostalgic service a month operated up until 2015. By obtaining a license in the summer of 2015 and with the financial support of the Trenčín Self-Governing Region, TREŽ, n.o. in addition to nostalgic year-round rides, also launched regular summer weekend operation of the railway, with a connection to the train and bus connections.

=== Rolling stock ===
At present, the vehicle fleet consists of three electric motor wagons of the 411.9 series (former EMU 46.1). All wagons were produced in 1951 and 1952, but in the 1980s they underwent reconstruction, in which significant modifications were made.

== Bibliography ==
- Adam Tatranský (2007). Električky na Slovensku : svedectvo historických pohľadníc (in Slovak). Vol. 1. Brno: Adam Tatranský. p. 88. ISBN 978-80-254-0296-2.
- Maruna, Zdeněk; Joachymstál, Petr (2010). Na úzkém rozchodu v Trenčianských Teplicích (in Slovak). Vol. 1. Litoměřice: Vydavatelství dopravní literatury. p. 263. ISBN 978-80-86765-13-6.
- Lichner, Dušan; Nosál, Dušan (2019). Električkou ku prameňom zdravia (in Slovak). Vol. 1. Žilina: Edis. ISBN 978-80-554-1561-1.

This article incorporates information from the corresponding article in Slovak Wikipedia
