= Bielovce =

Village and municipality in Slovakia

Bielovce Ipolybél
- Municipality
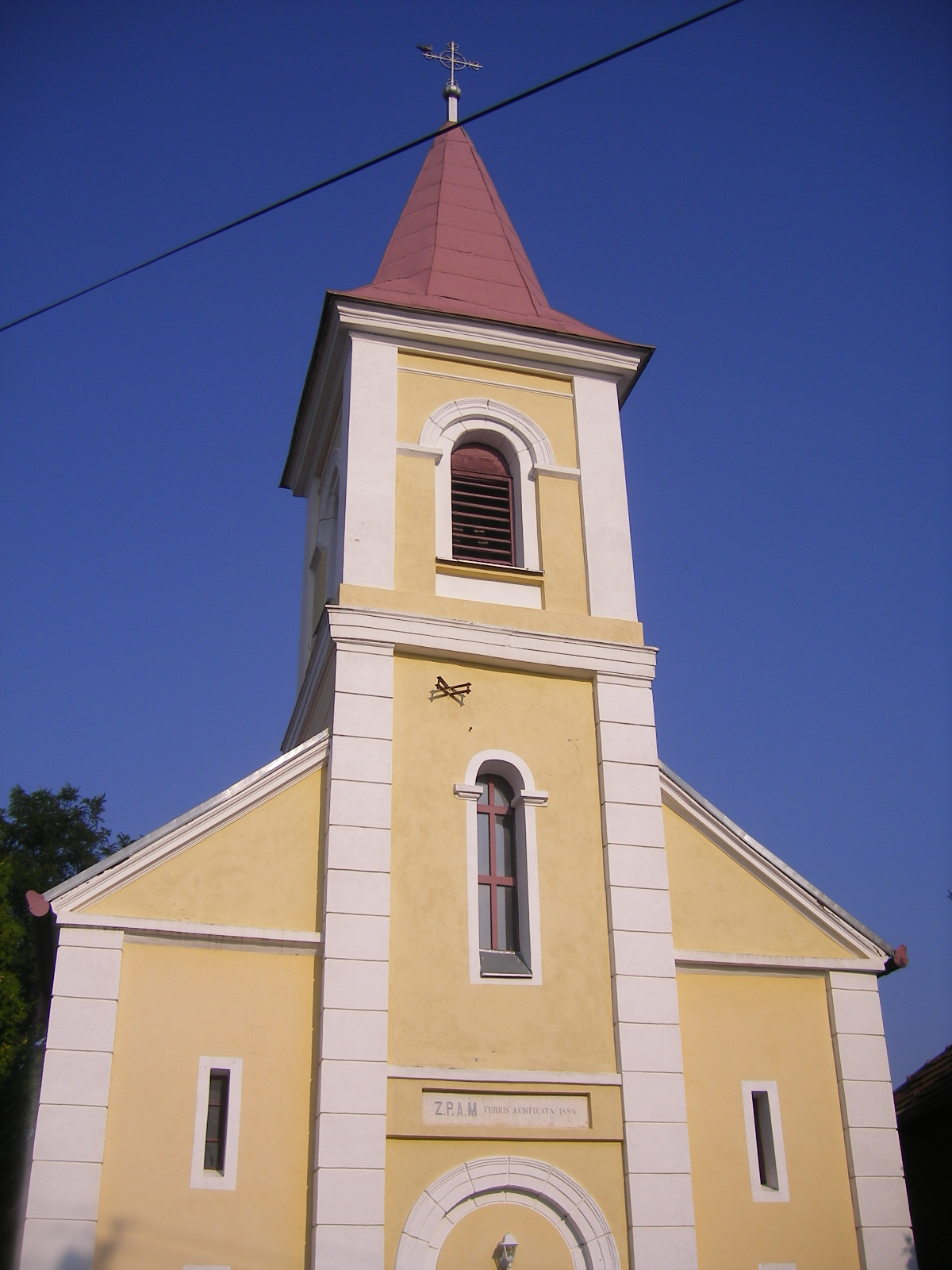
- Church in Bielovce

- Flag Coat of arms

- Location of Bielovce in the Nitra Region Location of Bielovce in Slovakia
- Coordinates: 48.00°N 18.78°E
- Country: Slovakia
- Region: Nitra Region
- District: Levice District
- First mentioned: 1138

Area
  - Total: 11.37 km^{2} (4.39 sq mi)
- Elevation: 115 m (377 ft)

Population (2025)
  - Total: 211
- Time zone: UTC+1 (CET)
  - Summer (DST): UTC+2 (CEST)
- Postal code: 935 74
- Area code: +421 36
- Vehicle registration plate (until 2022): LV
- Website: www.bielovce.sk

Bielovce (Hungarian: Ipolybél; pronounced [ˈipojbeːl]) is a village and municipality in the Levice District in the Nitra Region of south-west Slovakia.

== History ==
In historical records the village was first mentioned in 1138.

== Geography ==
The municipality lies at an altitude of 115 metres (377 ft) and covers an area of 11.37 km^{2} (4.39 sq mi) (2025).

== Population ==
Population statistic (10 years)
Year	1995	2005	2015	2025
Count	309	239	223	211
Difference		−22.65%	−6.69%	−5.38%

Population statistic
Year	2024	2025
Count	213	211
Difference		−0.93%

It has a population of 211 people (31 December 2025).

=== Ethnicity ===
Census 2021 (1+ %)
Ethnicity	Number	Fraction
Hungarian	177	78.66%
Slovak	46	20.44%
Not found out	10	4.44%
Total	225	

In year 2021 was 225 people by ethnicity 177 as Hungarian, 46 as Slovak, 10 as Not found out, 2 as Czech, 1 as Romani and 1 as Other.

Note on population: The difference values of population numbers in the table "Population statistic" and in the sections "Ethnicity" & "Religion" is caused by the use of various statistical methods.

=== Religion ===
Census 2021 (1+ %)
Religion	Number	Fraction
Roman Catholic Church	150	66.67%
Calvinist Church	34	15.11%
None	30	13.33%
Not found out	8	3.56%
Total	225	

In year 2021 was 225 people by religion 150 from Roman Catholic Church, 34 from Calvinist Church, 30 from None, 8 from Not found out, 2 from Evangelical Church and 1 from Other and not ascertained christian church.

== Facilities ==
The village has a public library, a swimming pool and a football pitch.

== Genealogical resources ==
The records for genealogical research are available at the state archive "Statny Archiv in Banska Bystrica, Nitra, Slovakia"

- Roman Catholic church records (births/marriages/deaths): 1714-1896 (parish B)
- Lutheran church records (births/marriages/deaths): 1793-1895 (parish B)
- Reformated church records (births/marriages/deaths): 1825-1895 (parish B)

== See also ==
- List of municipalities and towns in Slovakia
