= Bánovce nad Ondavou =

Village and municipality in Slovakia

Bánovce nad Ondavou Bánóc
- Municipality
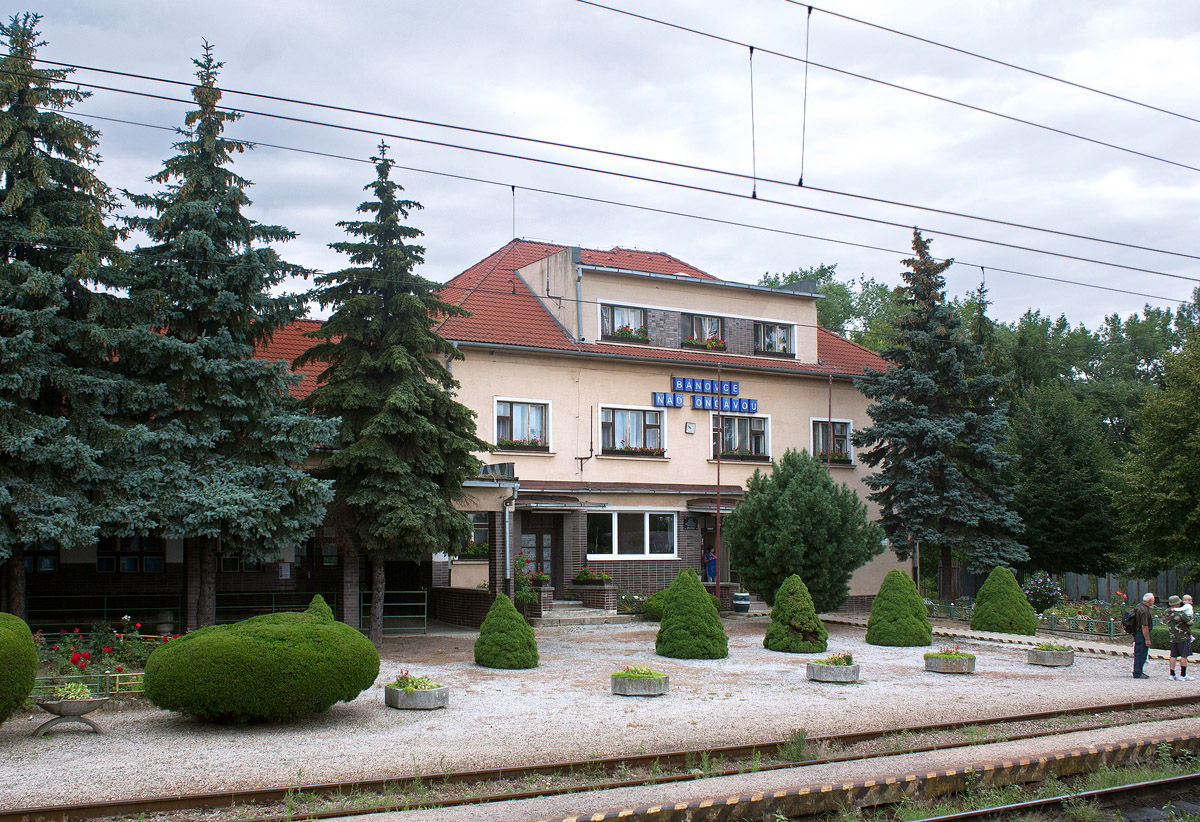

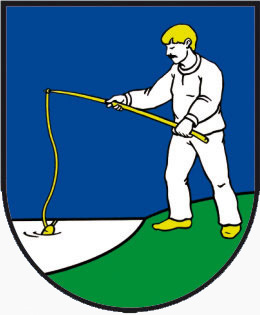
- Flag Coat of arms

- Location of Bánovce nad Ondavou in the Košice Region Location of Bánovce nad Ondavou in Slovakia
- Coordinates: 48.68°N 21.82°E
- Country: Slovakia
- Region: Košice Region
- District: Michalovce District
- First mentioned: 1326

Area
  - Total: 12.23 km^{2} (4.72 sq mi)
- Elevation: 110 m (360 ft)

Population (2025)
  - Total: 692
- Time zone: UTC+1 (CET)
  - Summer (DST): UTC+2 (CEST)
- Postal code: 720 4
- Area code: +421 56
- Vehicle registration plate (until 2022): MI
- Website: www.banovcenadondavou.sk

Bánovce nad Ondavou (Hungarian: Bánóc) is a village and municipality in the Michalovce District in the Kosice Region of eastern Slovakia.

== History ==
In historical records the village was first mentioned in 1326. Before the establishment of independent Czechoslovakia in 1918, it was part of Zemplén County within the Kingdom of Hungary.

== Geography ==
The municipality lies at an altitude of 110 metres (360 ft) and covers an area of 12.23 km^{2} (4.72 sq mi) (2025).

== Population ==
Population statistic (10 years)
| Year | 1995 | 2005 | 2015 | 2025 |
|---|---|---|---|---|
| Count | 751 | 762 | 730 | 692 |
| Difference | | +1.46% | −4.19% | −5.20% |

Population statistic
| Year | 2024 | 2025 |
|---|---|---|
| Count | 701 | 692 |
| Difference | | −1.28% |

It has a population of 692 people (31 December 2025).

=== Ethnicity ===
Census 2021 (1+ %)
| Ethnicity | Number | Fraction |
|---|---|---|
| Slovak | 679 | 97.41% |
| Not found out | 13 | 1.86% |
| Rusyn | 9 | 1.29% |
| Total | 697 | |

In year 2021 was 697 people by ethnicity 679 as Slovak, 13 as Not found out, 9 as Rusyn, 5 as Czech, 4 as Romani, 2 as Hungarian, 1 as Ukrainian and 1 as German.

Note on population: The difference values of population numbers in the table "Population statistic" and in the sections "Ethnicity" & "Religion" is caused by the use of various statistical methods.

=== Religion ===
Census 2021 (1+ %)
| Religion | Number | Fraction |
|---|---|---|
| Roman Catholic Church | 349 | 50.07% |
| Calvinist Church | 111 | 15.93% |
| Greek Catholic Church | 88 | 12.63% |
| Evangelical Church | 55 | 7.89% |
| None | 52 | 7.46% |
| Not found out | 21 | 3.01% |
| Eastern Orthodox Church | 17 | 2.44% |
| Total | 697 | |

In year 2021 was 697 people by religion 349 from Roman Catholic Church, 111 from Calvinist Church, 88 from Greek Catholic Church, 55 from Evangelical Church, 52 from None, 21 from Not found out, 17 from Eastern Orthodox Church, 1 from Other and not ascertained christian church, 1 from Jehovah's Witnesses, 1 from Other and 1 from Ad hoc movements.

== Government ==
The village relies on the tax and district offices, and fire brigade at Michalovce and relies on the police force and birth registry at Trhovište.

== Economy ==
The village has a post office, and a food store.

== Sports ==
The village has a football pitch.

== Transport ==
The village has a railway station.

== Genealogical resources ==
The records for genealogical research are available at the state archive in Prešov (Slovak: Štátny archív v Prešove).

- Roman Catholic church records (births/marriages/deaths): 1790-1895(parish B)
- Greek Catholic church records (births/marriages/deaths): 1804-1923(parish B)
- Lutheran church records (births/marriages/deaths): 1783-1895(parish B)
- Reformed church records (births/marriages/deaths): 1797-1895(parish A)

== Gallery ==
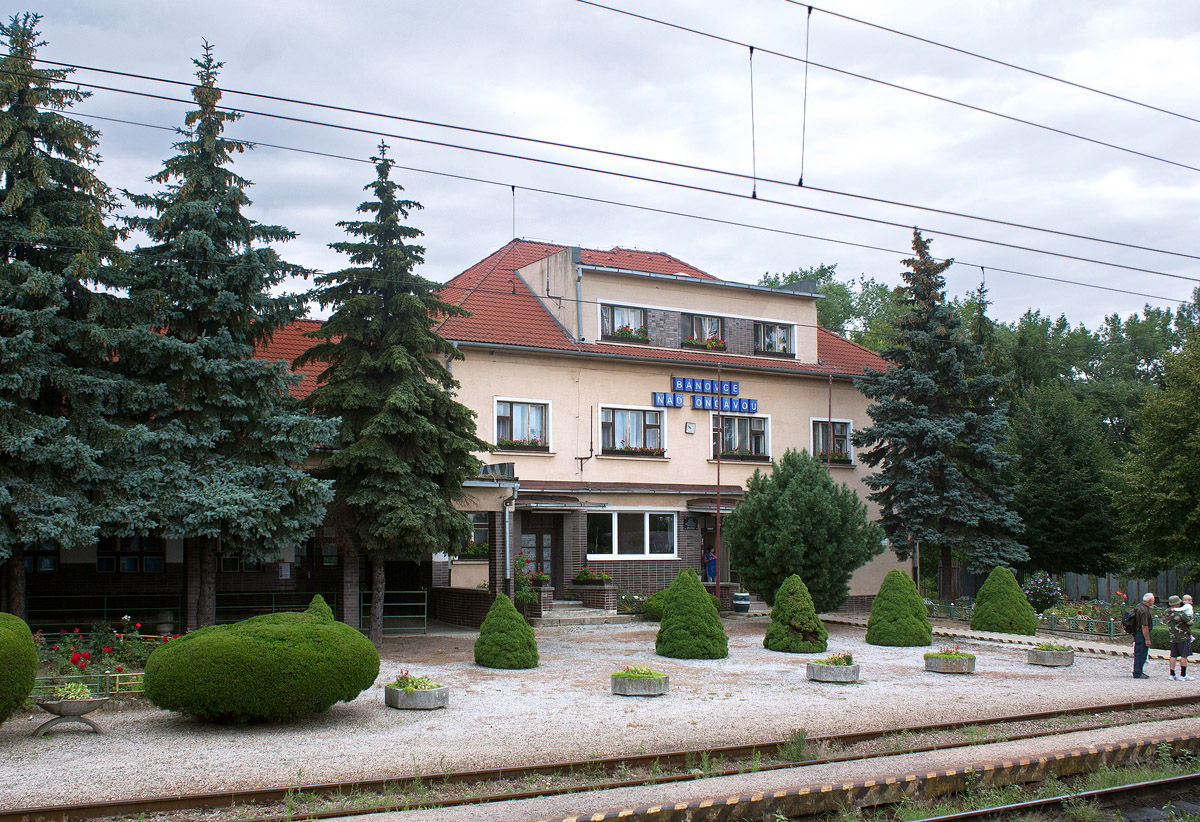
Bánovce nad Ondavou train station

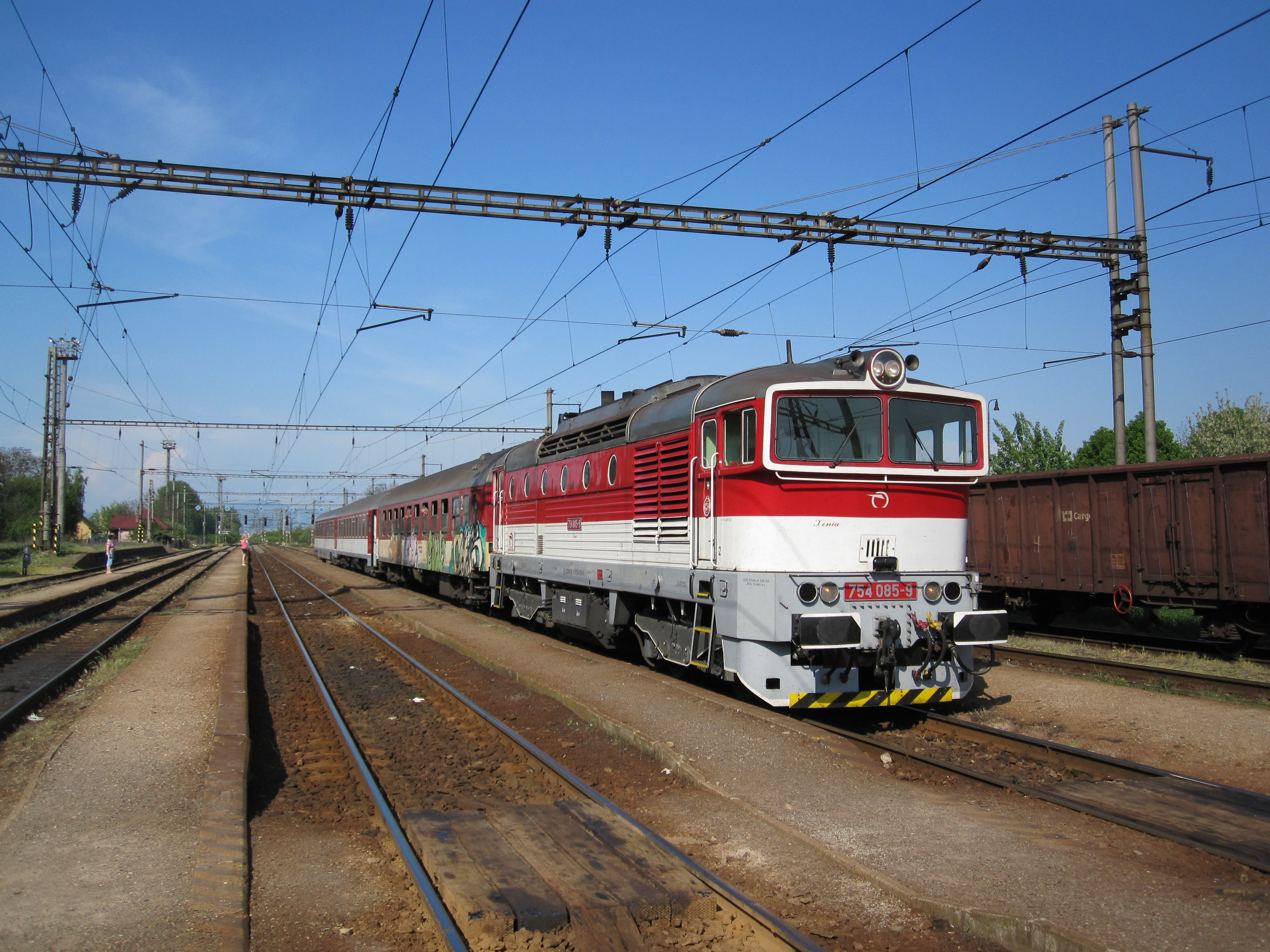
Diesel locomotive with passenger cars at Bánovce nad Ondavou train station

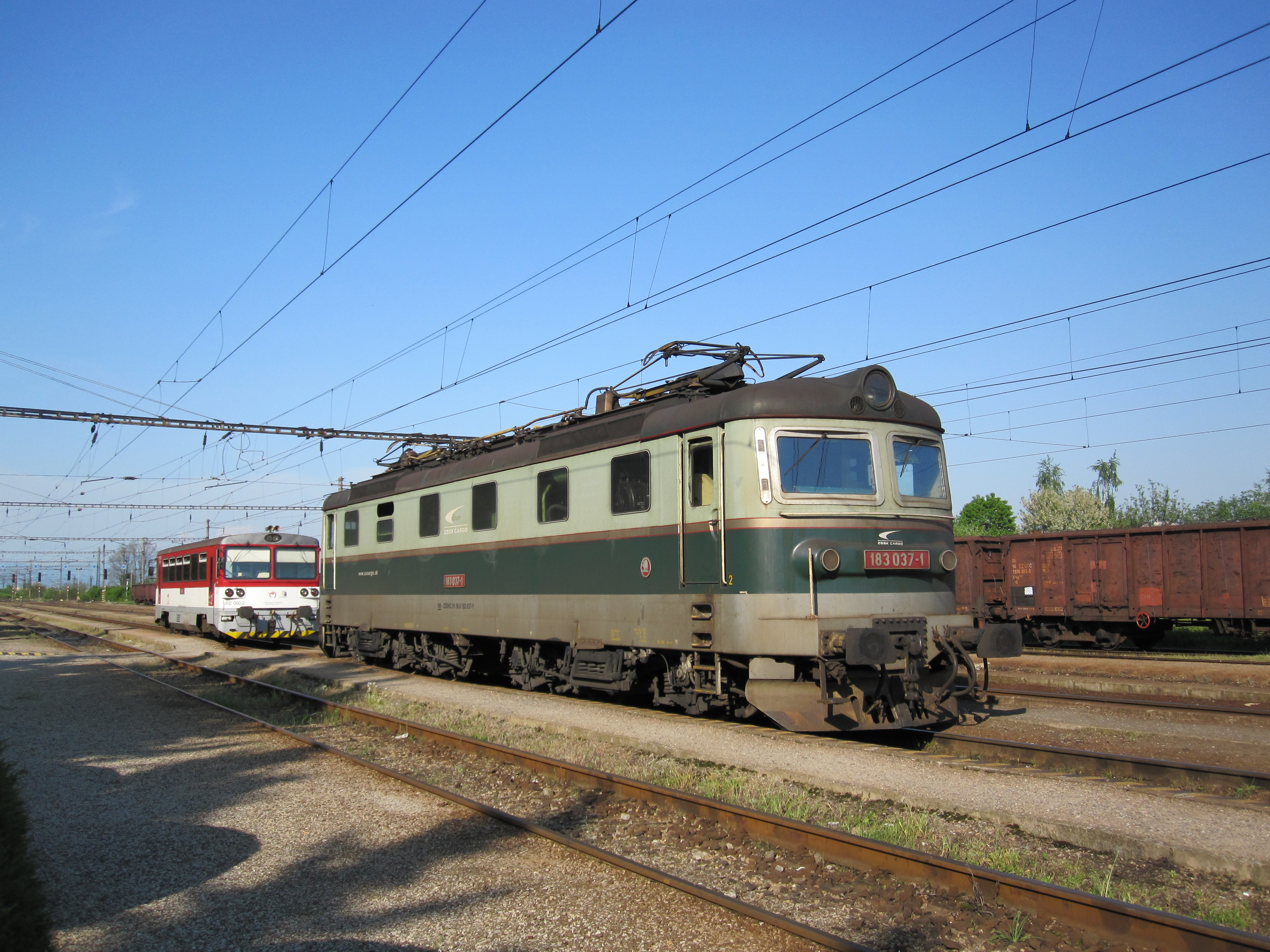
Electric locomotive (right) and 810 class DMU (left) at Bánovce nad Ondavou train station

== See also ==
- List of municipalities and towns in Michalovce District
- List of municipalities and towns in Slovakia
