= Nezbudská Lúčka =

Village and municipality in Slovakia

- Municipality
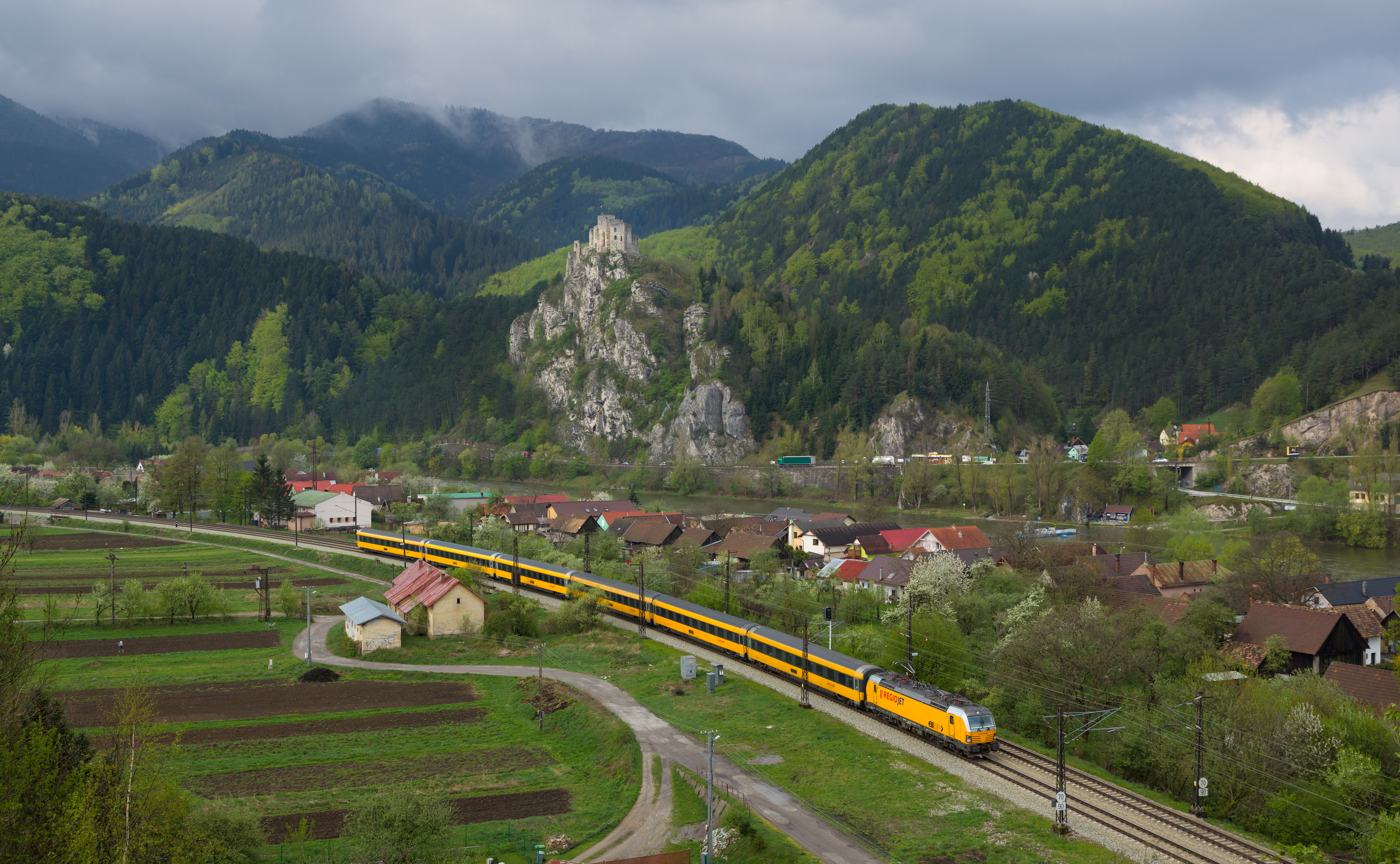

- Flag

- Location of Nezbudská Lúčka in the Žilina Region Location of Nezbudská Lúčka in Slovakia
- Coordinates: 49.18°N 18.87°E
- Country: Slovakia
- Region: Žilina Region
- District: Žilina District
- First mentioned: 1439

Area
  - Total: 8.21 km^{2} (3.17 sq mi)
- Elevation: 357 m (1,171 ft)

Population (2025)
  - Total: 397
- Time zone: UTC+1 (CET)
  - Summer (DST): UTC+2 (CEST)
- Postal code: 130 3
- Area code: +421 41
- Vehicle registration plate (until 2022): ZA
- Website: www.nezbudskalucka.sk

Nezbudská Lúčka (Hungarian: Óváralja) is a village and municipality in Žilina District in the Žilina Region of northern Slovakia.

== History ==
In historical records the village was first mentioned in 1439.

== Geography ==
The municipality lies at an altitude of 357 metres (1,171 ft) and covers an area of 8.21 km^{2} (3.17 sq mi) (2025).

== Population ==
Population statistic (10 years)
Year	1995	2005	2015	2025
Count	394	373	403	397
Difference		−5.32%	+8.04%	−1.48%

Population statistic
Year	2024	2025
Count	399	397
Difference		−0.50%

It has a population of 397 people (31 December 2025).

=== Ethnicity ===
Census 2021 (1+ %)
Ethnicity	Number	Fraction
Slovak	373	96.63%
Not found out	9	2.33%
Czech	4	1.03%
Total	386	

In year 2021 was 386 people by ethnicity 373 as Slovak, 9 as Not found out, 4 as Czech and 1 as Bulgarian.

Note on population: The difference values of population numbers in the table "Population statistic" and in the sections "Ethnicity" & "Religion" is caused by the use of various statistical methods.

=== Religion ===
Census 2021 (1+ %)
Religion	Number	Fraction
Roman Catholic Church	299	77.46%
None	42	10.88%
Not found out	14	3.63%
Christian Congregations in Slovakia	10	2.59%
Calvinist Church	6	1.55%
Greek Catholic Church	4	1.04%
Evangelical Church	4	1.04%
Baptists Church	4	1.04%
Total	386	

In year 2021 was 386 people by religion 299 from Roman Catholic Church, 42 from None, 14 from Not found out, 10 from Christian Congregations in Slovakia, 6 from Calvinist Church, 4 from Greek Catholic Church, 4 from Evangelical Church, 4 from Baptists Church, 2 from United Methodist Church and 1 from Ad hoc movements.
