= Slovenské Nové Mesto =

Slovenské Nové Mesto Slovenské Nové Mesto
- Municipality
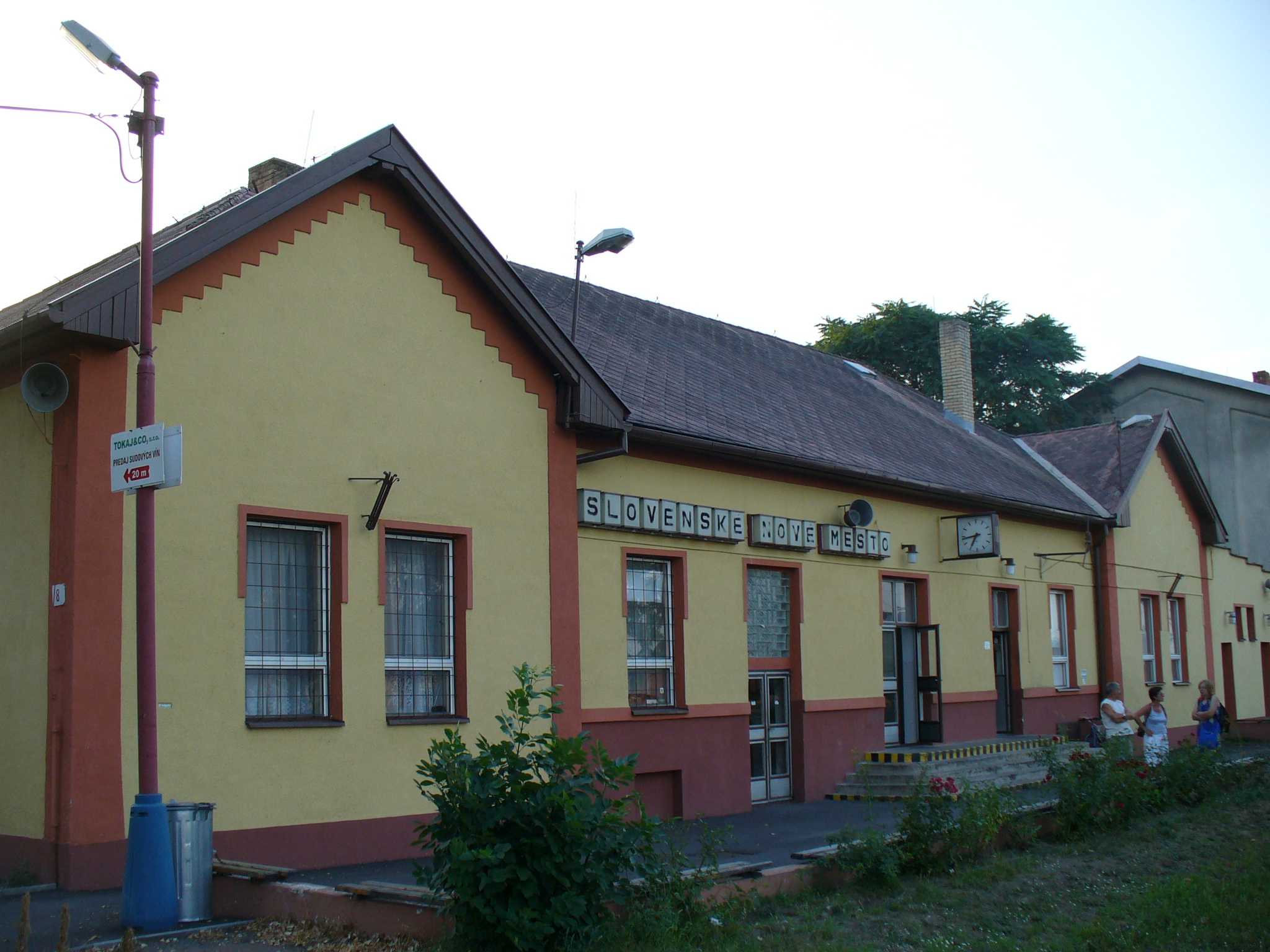
- Train station in Slovenské Nové Mesto

- Flag

- Location of Slovenské Nové Mesto in the Košice Region Location of Slovenské Nové Mesto in Slovakia
- Coordinates: 48.40°N 21.67°E
- Country: Slovakia
- Region: Košice Region
- District: Trebišov District
- First mentioned: 1918

Government
  - Mayor: Ján Kalinič

Area
  - Total: 13.37 km^{2} (5.16 sq mi)
- Elevation: 102 m (335 ft)

Population (2025)
  - Total: 1,059
- Time zone: UTC+1 (CET)
  - Summer (DST): UTC+2 (CEST)
- Postal code: 763 3
- Area code: +421 56
- Vehicle registration plate (until 2022): TV

Slovenské Nové Mesto (Hungarian: Újhely, Kisújhely, Szlovákújhely or Tótújhely) is a village and municipality in the Trebišov District in the Košice Region of south-eastern Slovakia.

== History ==
The village is a former suburb of the Hungarian city of Sátoraljaújhely (Slovak: Nové Mesto pod Šiatrom), which was separated from the rest of the city by the border of the newly created Czechoslovakia in 1920. The Košice - Mukachevo railway-line made the village strategically important.

== Geography ==
The municipality lies at an altitude of 102 metres (335 ft) and covers an area of 13.37 km^{2} (5.16 sq mi) (2025).

== Population ==
Population statistic (10 years)
Year	1995	2005	2015	2025
Count	978	1053	1095	1059
Difference		+7.66%	+3.98%	−3.28%

Population statistic
Year	2024	2025
Count	1067	1059
Difference		−0.74%

It has a population of 1059 people (31 December 2025).

=== Ethnicity ===
Census 2021 (1+ %)
Ethnicity	Number	Fraction
Slovak	880	80%
Hungarian	138	12.54%
Romani	120	10.9%
Not found out	40	3.63%
Total	1100	

In year 2021 was 1100 people by ethnicity 880 as Slovak, 138 as Hungarian, 120 as Romani, 40 as Not found out, 7 as Czech, 5 as Rusyn, 2 as Ukrainian, 1 as Polish, 1 as Other and 1 as English.

Note on population: The difference values of population numbers in the table "Population statistic" and in the sections "Ethnicity" & "Religion" is caused by the use of various statistical methods.

=== Religion ===
Census 2021 (1+ %)
Religion	Number	Fraction
Roman Catholic Church	417	37.91%
Greek Catholic Church	251	22.82%
None	193	17.55%
Calvinist Church	144	13.09%
Not found out	45	4.09%
Jehovah's Witnesses	27	2.45%
Total	1100	

In year 2021 was 1100 people by religion 417 from Roman Catholic Church, 251 from Greek Catholic Church, 193 from None, 144 from Calvinist Church, 45 from Not found out, 27 from Jehovah's Witnesses, 8 from Evangelical Church, 6 from Eastern Orthodox Church, 3 from Other and not ascertained christian church, 1 from Christian Congregations in Slovakia, 1 from Other, 1 from Hinduism, 1 from Seventh-day Adventist Church, 1 from Buddhism and 1 from Ad hoc movements.

== Politics ==
The present mayor is Ján Kalinič.

== Facilities ==
The village has a public library and a football pitch.
