= Michaľany =

Municipality of Slovakia

Michaľany Alsómihályi
- Municipality
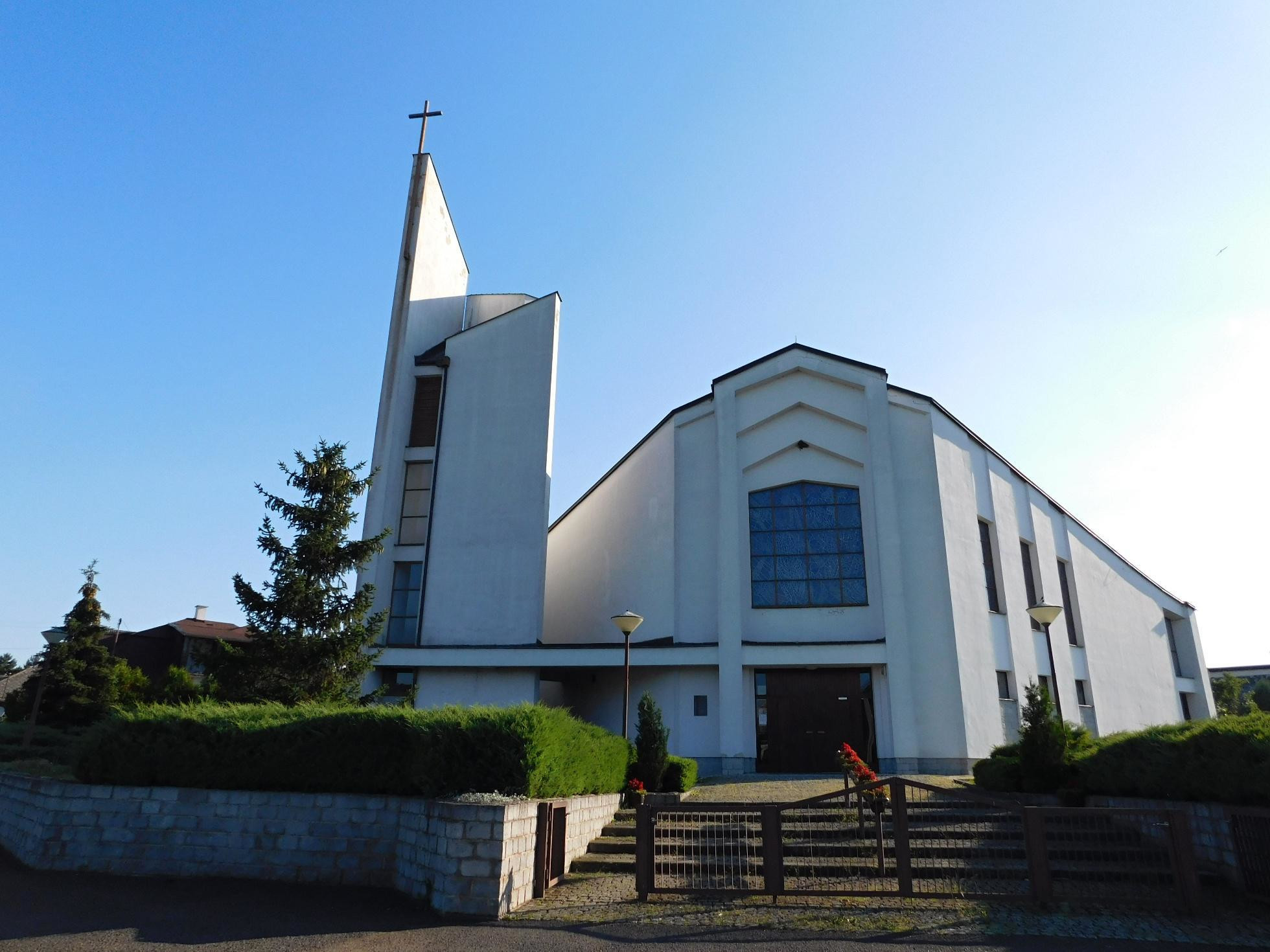

- Flag

- Location of Michaľany in the Košice Region Location of Michaľany in Slovakia
- Coordinates: 48.51°N 21.61°E
- Country: Slovakia
- Region: Košice Region
- District: Trebišov District
- First mentioned: 1273

Area
  - Total: 8.15 km^{2} (3.15 sq mi)
- Elevation: 130 m (430 ft)

Population (2025)
  - Total: 1,736
- Time zone: UTC+1 (CET)
  - Summer (DST): UTC+2 (CEST)
- Postal code: 761 4
- Area code: +421 56
- Vehicle registration plate (until 2022): TV
- Website: michalany.eu

Michaľany (Slovak: [ˈmixaʎani]; Hungarian: Alsómihályi [ˈɒlʃoːmihaːji]) is a village and municipality in the Trebišov District in the Košice Region of south-eastern Slovakia.

== History ==
In historical records the village was first mentioned in 1273.

== Geography ==
The municipality lies at an altitude of 130 metres (430 ft) and covers an area of 8.15 km^{2} (3.15 sq mi) (2025).

== Population ==
Population statistic (10 years)
Year	1995	2005	2015	2025
Count	1716	1758	1925	1736
Difference		+2.44%	+9.49%	−9.81%

Population statistic
Year	2024	2025
Count	1735	1736
Difference		+0.05%

It has a population of 1736 people (31 December 2025).

=== Ethnicity ===
Census 2021 (1+ %)
Ethnicity	Number	Fraction
Slovak	1573	90.19%
Not found out	111	6.36%
Romani	66	3.78%
Hungarian	29	1.66%
Total	1744	

In year 2021 was 1744 people by ethnicity 1573 as Slovak, 111 as Not found out, 66 as Romani, 29 as Hungarian, 8 as Czech, 5 as Rusyn, 3 as Ukrainian, 2 as Russian and 2 as Other.

Note on population: The difference values of population numbers in the table "Population statistic" and in the sections "Ethnicity" & "Religion" is caused by the use of various statistical methods.

=== Religion ===
Census 2021 (1+ %)
Religion	Number	Fraction
Roman Catholic Church	865	49.6%
Greek Catholic Church	374	21.44%
Not found out	179	10.26%
None	148	8.49%
Calvinist Church	99	5.68%
Eastern Orthodox Church	25	1.43%
Evangelical Church	23	1.32%
Total	1744	

In year 2021 was 1744 people by religion 865 from Roman Catholic Church, 374 from Greek Catholic Church, 179 from Not found out, 148 from None, 99 from Calvinist Church, 25 from Eastern Orthodox Church, 23 from Evangelical Church, 17 from Jehovah's Witnesses, 5 from Other and not ascertained christian church, 4 from Christian Congregations in Slovakia, 1 from Islam, 1 from United Methodist Church, 1 from Buddhism, 1 from Apostolic Church and 1 from Ad hoc movements.

== Facilities ==
The village has a public library a gym and a football pitch.
