= Orlov, Stará Ľubovňa District =

Orlov
- Municipality
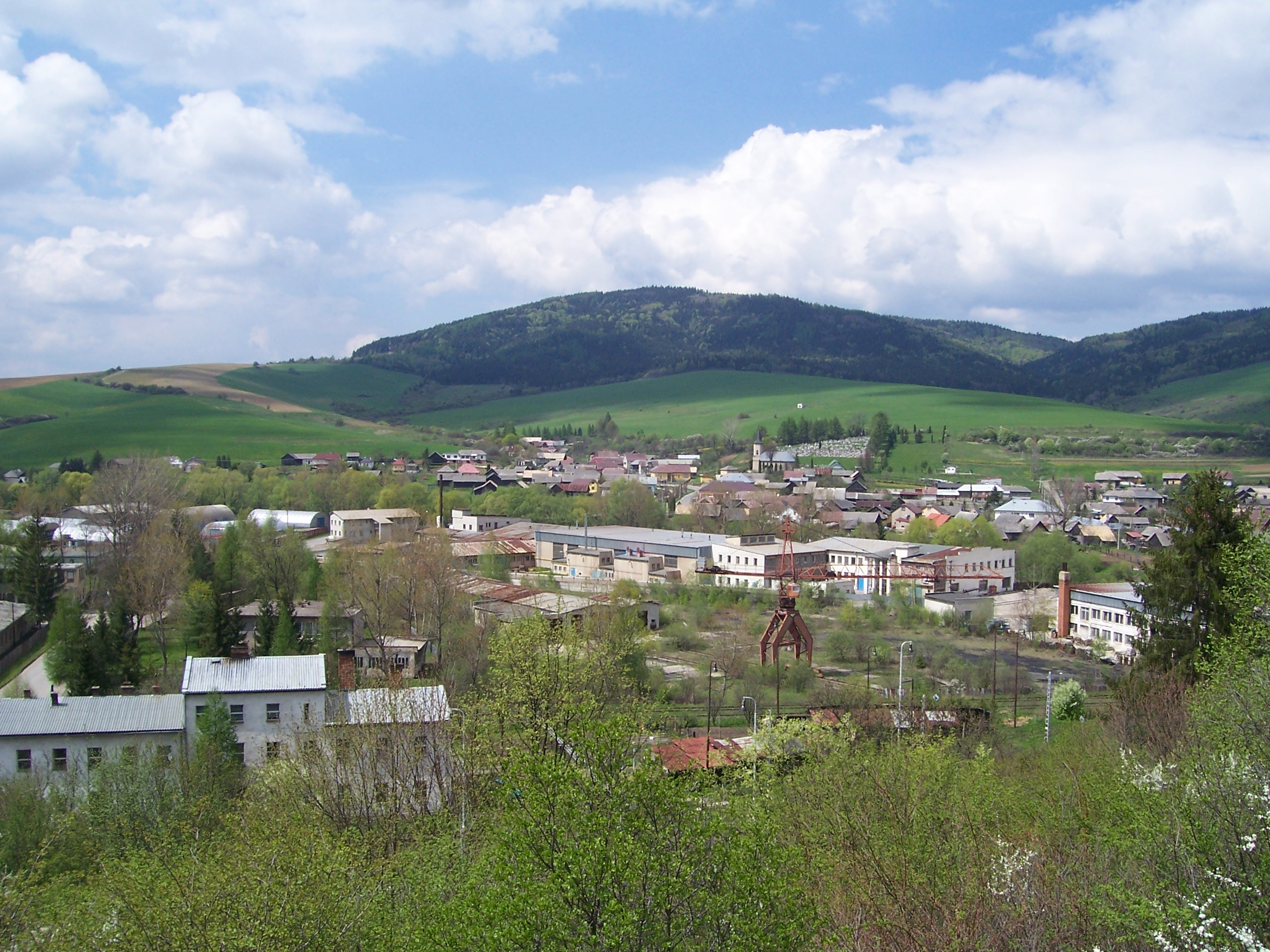

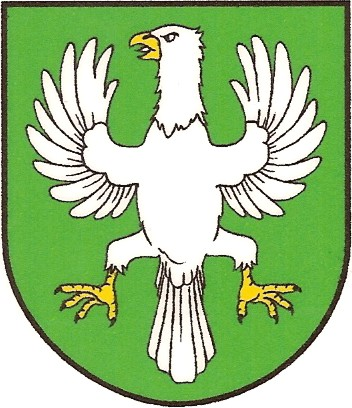
- Flag Coat of arms

- Location of Orlov in the Prešov Region Location of Orlov in Slovakia
- Coordinates: 49.28°N 20.87°E
- Country: Slovakia
- Region: Prešov Region
- District: Stará Ľubovňa District
- First mentioned: 1349

Area
  - Total: 20.76 km^{2} (8.02 sq mi)
- Elevation: 480 m (1,570 ft)

Population (2025)
  - Total: 599
- Time zone: UTC+1 (CET)
  - Summer (DST): UTC+2 (CEST)
- Postal code: 654 3
- Area code: +421 52
- Vehicle registration plate (until 2022): SL
- Website: www.obecorlov.sk

Orlov (Rusyn: Орлов; Hungarian: Orló) is a village and municipality in Stará Ľubovňa District in the Prešov Region of northern Slovakia.

== History ==
In historical records the village was first mentioned in 1349. Before the establishment of independent Czechoslovakia in 1918, Orlov was part of Sáros County within the Kingdom of Hungary. From 1939 to 1945, it was part of the Slovak Republic. On 23 January 1945, the Red Army dislodged the Wehrmacht from Orlov and it was once again part of Czechoslovakia.

== Geography ==
The municipality lies at an altitude of 480 metres (1,570 ft) and covers an area of 20.76 km^{2} (8.02 sq mi) (2025).

== Population ==
Population statistic (10 years)
Year	1995	2005	2015	2025
Count	790	757	633	599
Difference		−4.17%	−16.38%	−5.37%

Population statistic
Year	2024	2025
Count	600	599
Difference		−0.16%

It has a population of 599 people (31 December 2025).

=== Ethnicity ===
Census 2021 (1+ %)
Ethnicity	Number	Fraction
Slovak	537	89.35%
Rusyn	193	32.11%
Not found out	28	4.65%
Total	601	

In year 2021 was 601 people by ethnicity 537 as Slovak, 193 as Rusyn, 28 as Not found out, 6 as Russian, 1 as Czech, 1 as German and 1 as Hungarian.

Note on population: The difference values of population numbers in the table "Population statistic" and in the sections "Ethnicity" & "Religion" is caused by the use of various statistical methods.

=== Religion ===
Census 2021 (1+ %)
Religion	Number	Fraction
Greek Catholic Church	457	76.04%
Roman Catholic Church	96	15.97%
Not found out	22	3.66%
None	15	2.5%
Eastern Orthodox Church	7	1.16%
Total	601	

In year 2021 was 601 people by religion 457 from Greek Catholic Church, 96 from Roman Catholic Church, 22 from Not found out, 15 from None, 7 from Eastern Orthodox Church, 1 from Paganism and natural spirituality, 1 from Christian Congregations in Slovakia, 1 from Other and 1 from Ad hoc movements.
