= Chrenovec-Brusno =

- Municipality
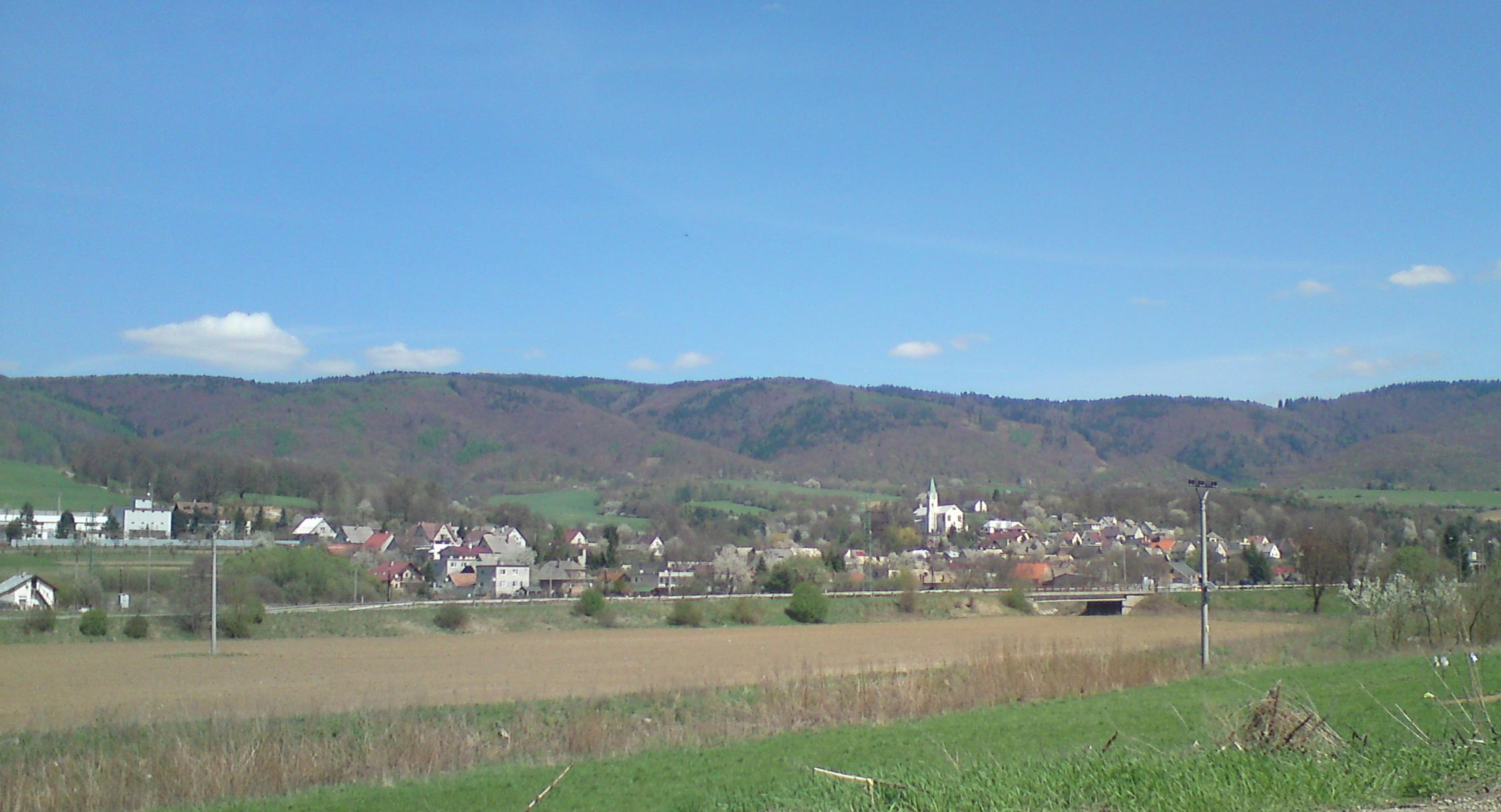

- Flag

- Location of Chrenovec-Brusno in the Trenčín Region Location of Chrenovec-Brusno in Slovakia
- Coordinates: 48.78°N 18.73°E
- Country: Slovakia
- Region: Trenčín Region
- District: Prievidza District
- First mentioned: 1243

Area
  - Total: 12.32 km^{2} (4.76 sq mi)
- Elevation: 335 m (1,099 ft)

Population (2025)
  - Total: 1,413
- Time zone: UTC+1 (CET)
  - Summer (DST): UTC+2 (CEST)
- Postal code: 972 32
- Area code: +421 46
- Vehicle registration plate (until 2022): PD
- Website: www.chrenovec-brusno.sk

Chrenovec-Brusno (Hungarian: Tormásborosznó) is a village and municipality in Prievidza District in the Trenčín Region of western Slovakia.

== History ==
The village was first mentioned in historical records in 1243.

== Geography ==
The municipality lies at an altitude of 335 metres (1,099 ft) and covers an area of 12.32 km^{2} (4.76 sq mi) (2025).

== Population ==
Population statistic (10 years)
Year	1995	2005	2015	2025
Count	1262	1342	1376	1413
Difference		+6.33%	+2.53%	+2.68%

Population statistic
Year	2024	2025
Count	1413	1413
Difference		+0%

It has a population of 1413 people (31 December 2025).

=== Ethnicity ===
Census 2021 (1+ %)
Ethnicity	Number	Fraction
Slovak	1349	96.98%
Not found out	41	2.94%
Total	1391	

In year 2021 was 1391 people by ethnicity 1349 as Slovak, 41 as Not found out, 6 as Czech, 5 as German, 4 as Hungarian, 2 as Polish, 2 as Other, 1 as Jewish, 1 as Irish, 1 as Italian, 1 as Russian and 1 as Canadian.

Note on population: The difference values of population numbers in the table "Population statistic" and in the sections "Ethnicity" & "Religion" is caused by the use of various statistical methods.

=== Religion ===
Census 2021 (1+ %)
Religion	Number	Fraction
Roman Catholic Church	856	61.54%
None	465	33.43%
Not found out	36	2.59%
Total	1391	

In year 2021 was 1391 people by religion 856 from Roman Catholic Church, 465 from None, 36 from Not found out, 12 from Evangelical Church, 7 from Greek Catholic Church, 6 from Christian Congregations in Slovakia, 4 from Ad hoc movements, 2 from Other and not ascertained christian church, 1 from Jehovah's Witnesses, 1 from Other and 1 from Buddhism.

== Genealogical resources ==
The records for genealogical research are available at the state archive "Statny Archiv in Nitra, Slovakia"

- Roman Catholic church records (births/marriages/deaths): 1698–1929 (parish A)

== See also ==
- List of municipalities and towns in Slovakia
