= Haniska, Košice-okolie District =

Village and municipality in Slovakia

Haniska Enyicke
- Municipality
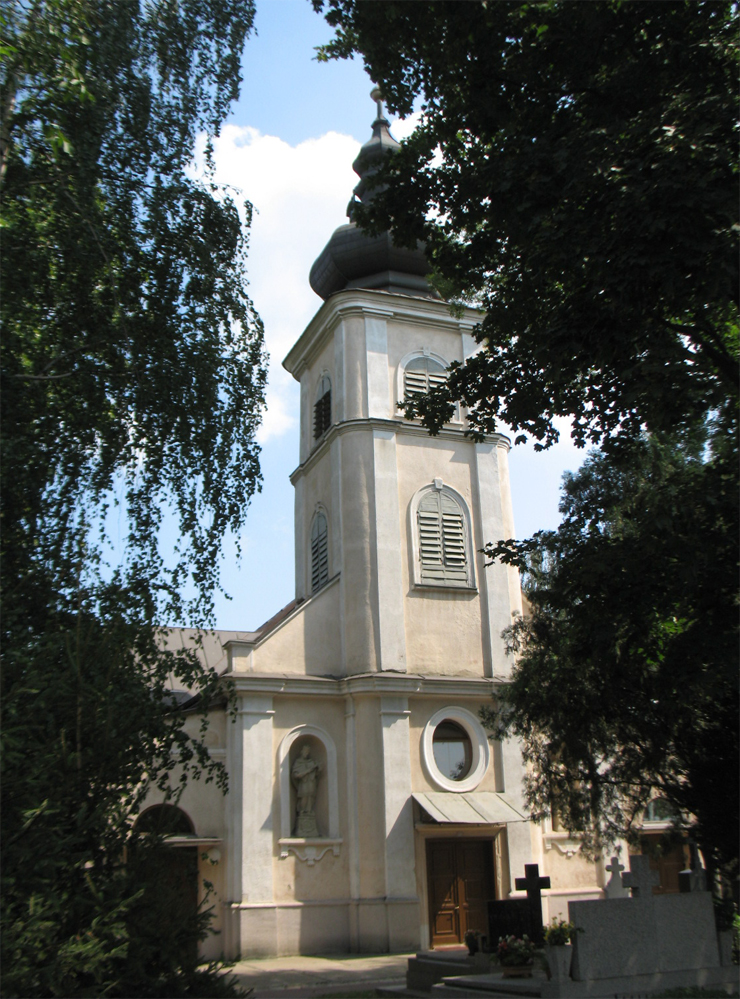

- Flag

- Location of Haniska in the Košice Region Location of Haniska in Slovakia
- Coordinates: 48.72°N 21.25°E
- Country: Slovakia
- Region: Košice Region
- District: Košice-okolie District
- First mentioned: 1288

Area
  - Total: 17.28 km^{2} (6.67 sq mi)
- Elevation: 200 m (660 ft)

Population (2025)
  - Total: 1,579
- Time zone: UTC+1 (CET)
  - Summer (DST): UTC+2 (CEST)
- Postal code: 445 7
- Area code: +421 55
- Vehicle registration plate (until 2022): KS
- Website: www.haniska.sk

Haniska (Hungarian: Enyicke) is a village and municipality in Košice-okolie District in the Kosice Region of eastern Slovakia.

== History ==
Historically, the village was first mentioned in 1288. Haniska has been its official name since 1921, and was a co-name in the early 20th century and most of the 19th century. Its Hungarian name, its original and former co-name, is Enyiczke, variously spelled Enjiczke, Enjicske, and Enyicske.

== Geography ==
The municipality lies at an altitude of 200 metres (660 ft) and covers an area of 17.28 km^{2} (6.67 sq mi) (2025).

== Population ==
Population statistic (10 years)
Year	1995	2005	2015	2025
Count	1317	1345	1486	1579
Difference		+2.12%	+10.48%	+6.25%

Population statistic
Year	2024	2025
Count	1572	1579
Difference		+0.44%

It has a population of 1579 people (31 December 2025).

=== Ethnicity ===
Census 2021 (1+ %)
Ethnicity	Number	Fraction
Slovak	1467	98.19%
Not found out	26	1.74%
Total	1494	

In year 2021 was 1494 people by ethnicity 1467 as Slovak, 26 as Not found out, 5 as Hungarian, 4 as Rusyn, 2 as German, 1 as Ukrainian, 1 as Polish, 1 as Other and 1 as French.

Note on population: The difference values of population numbers in the table "Population statistic" and in the sections "Ethnicity" & "Religion" is caused by the use of various statistical methods.

=== Religion ===
Census 2021 (1+ %)
Religion	Number	Fraction
Roman Catholic Church	1247	83.47%
None	131	8.77%
Greek Catholic Church	46	3.08%
Not found out	42	2.81%
Total	1494	

In year 2021 was 1494 people by religion 1247 from Roman Catholic Church, 131 from None, 46 from Greek Catholic Church, 42 from Not found out, 9 from Evangelical Church, 5 from Calvinist Church, 3 from Eastern Orthodox Church, 3 from Ad hoc movements, 2 from Other and not ascertained christian church, 2 from Christian Congregations in Slovakia, 1 from Jehovah's Witnesses, 1 from Seventh-day Adventist Church, 1 from Buddhism and 1 from Apostolic Church.

== Genealogical resources ==
The records for genealogical research are available at the state archive "Statny Archiv in Kosice, Slovakia"

- Roman Catholic church records (births/marriages/deaths): 1714-1952 (parish A)
- Greek Catholic church records (births/marriages/deaths): 1791-1896 (parish B)
- Reformated church records (births/marriages/deaths): 1800-1895 (parish B)

== See also ==
- List of municipalities and towns in Slovakia
