= Čata =

Čata Csata
- Municipality
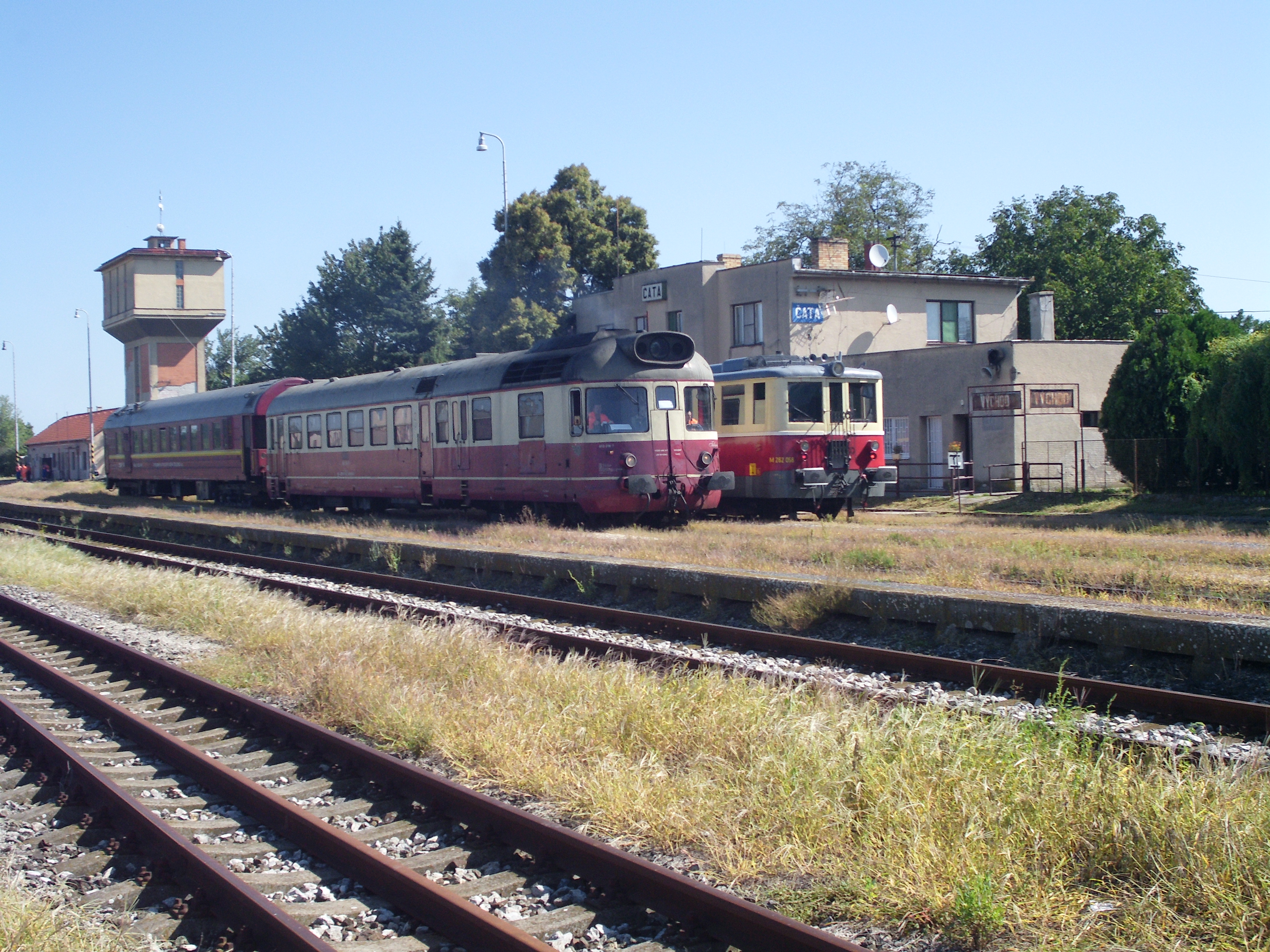
- View of Čata Station

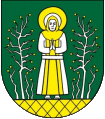
- Flag Coat of arms

- Location of Čata in the Nitra Region Location of Čata in Slovakia
- Coordinates: 47.95°N 18.67°E
- Country: Slovakia
- Region: Nitra Region
- District: Levice District
- First mentioned: 1386

Area
  - Total: 14.77 km^{2} (5.70 sq mi)
- Elevation: 132 m (433 ft)

Population (2025)
  - Total: 1,024
- Time zone: UTC+1 (CET)
  - Summer (DST): UTC+2 (CEST)
- Postal code: 935 63
- Area code: +421 36
- Vehicle registration plate (until 2022): LV
- Website: www.obeccata.sk

Čata (Hungarian: Csata) is a village and municipality in the Levice District in the Nitra Region of south-west Slovakia.

== History ==
In historical records the village was first mentioned in 1386.

== Geography ==
The municipality lies at an altitude of 132 metres (433 ft) and covers an area of 14.77 km^{2} (5.70 sq mi) (2025).

== Population ==
Population statistic (10 years)
Year	1995	2005	2015	2025
Count	1220	1166	985	1024
Difference		−4.42%	−15.52%	+3.95%

Population statistic
Year	2024	2025
Count	1041	1024
Difference		−1.63%

It has a population of 1024 people (31 December 2025).

=== Ethnicity ===
Census 2021 (1+ %)
Ethnicity	Number	Fraction
Hungarian	618	56.95%
Slovak	417	38.43%
Not found out	70	6.45%
Romani	46	4.23%
Total	1085	

In year 2021 was 1085 people by ethnicity 618 as Hungarian, 417 as Slovak, 70 as Not found out, 46 as Romani, 9 as Romanian, 4 as Czech, 2 as German, 2 as Other and 1 as Russian.

Note on population: The difference values of population numbers in the table "Population statistic" and in the sections "Ethnicity" & "Religion" is caused by the use of various statistical methods.

=== Religion ===
Census 2021 (1+ %)
Religion	Number	Fraction
Roman Catholic Church	624	57.51%
None	250	23.04%
Not found out	60	5.53%
Calvinist Church	59	5.44%
Evangelical Church	49	4.52%
Christian Congregations in Slovakia	18	1.66%
Greek Catholic Church	12	1.11%
Total	1085	

In year 2021 was 1085 people by religion 624 from Roman Catholic Church, 250 from None, 60 from Not found out, 59 from Calvinist Church, 49 from Evangelical Church, 18 from Christian Congregations in Slovakia, 12 from Greek Catholic Church, 7 from Jehovah's Witnesses, 2 from United Methodist Church, 1 from Old Catholic Church, 1 from Paganism and natural spirituality, 1 from Other and not ascertained christian church and 1 from Apostolic Church.

== Facilities ==
The village has a public library a gym and a football pitch.

== Genealogical resources ==
The records for genealogical research are available at the state archive "Statny Archiv in Nitra, Slovakia"

- Roman Catholic church records (births/marriages/deaths): 1700-1896 (parish B)
- Reformated church records (births/marriages/deaths): 1784-1895 (parish B)

== See also ==
- List of municipalities and towns in Slovakia
