= Bratislava-Vinohrady railway stop =

Railway station in Bratislava, Slovakia

Bratislava-Vinohrady
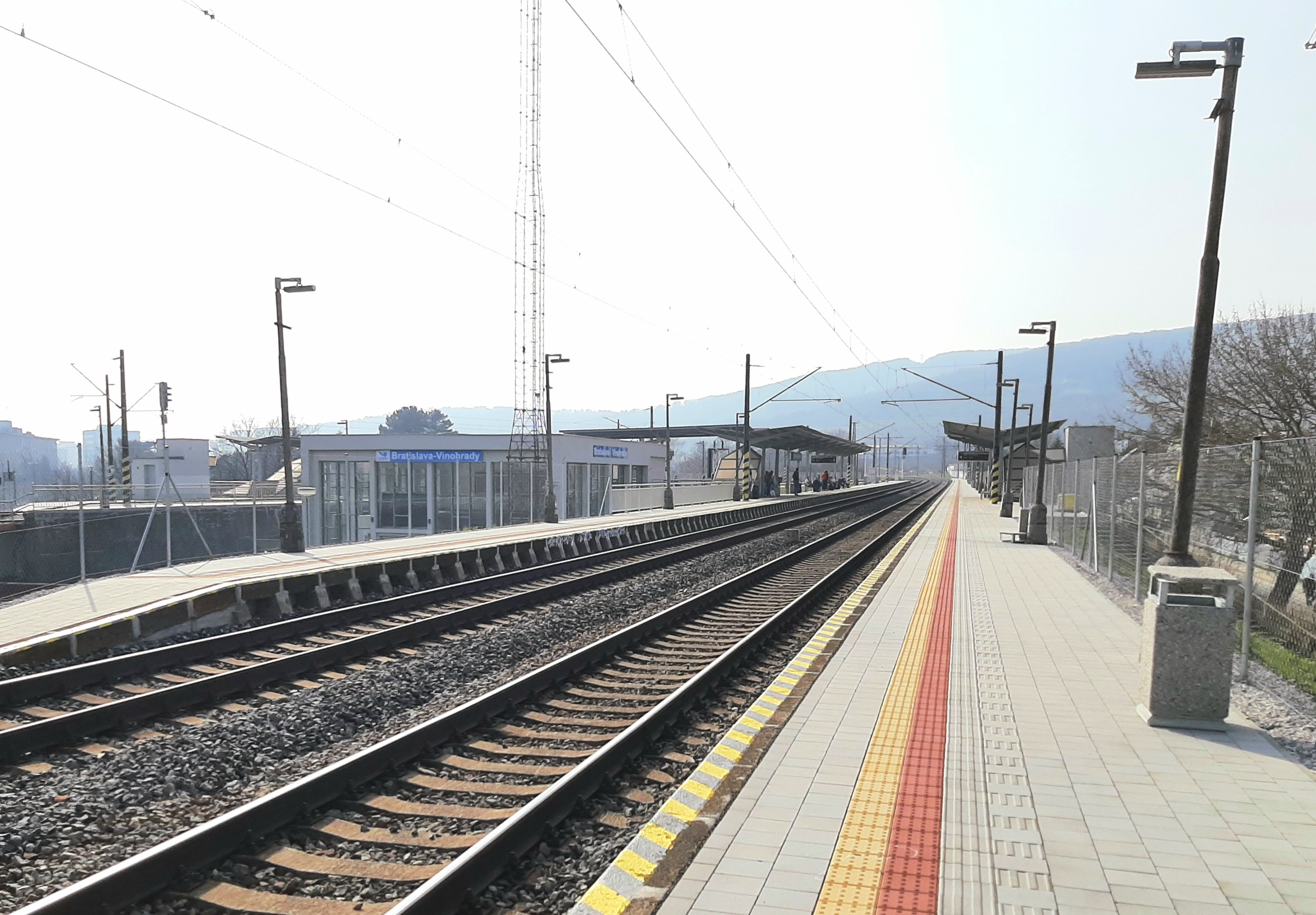
- Bratislava-Vinohrady railway stop in 2024, platforms of the Žilina – Bratislava hl. st railway (line No. 120)

General information
- Other names: Bratislava-Vinohrady railway station (Slovak: Železničná stanica Bratislava-Vinohrady)
- Location: Račianska; Nové Mesto, Bratislava; Slovakia
- Coordinates: 48.18693°N 17.133848°E
- Operated by: Železnice Slovenskej Republiky
- Line: 120, 130
- Platforms: 4
- Tracks: 4
Location

Bratislava-Vinohrady railway stop or halt (Slovak: Železničná zastávka Bratislava-Vinohrady), often incorrectly called Bratislava-Vinohrady railway station (Slovak: Železničná stanica Bratislava – Vinohrady) is a railway station classified as a halt in the third Bratislava district in the Nové Mesto borough on the border with the Rača in the local part known as Vinohrady.

Approximately 160 trains stop at the station daily, including no international express trains.

It was created during the transshipment of the section Bratislava-Vinohrady – Rača-odbočka, while the off-level crossing of the section with the line Rača-odbočka – Bratislava predmestie and also the associated sharp curve were removed. With this, the Rača-odbočka transport station was renamed to Odbočka Vinohrady.

It also allows you to transfer between most trains from/to Galanta and Trnava without having to go to main station.

In January 2019, ŽSR allocated 370 thousand euros for the repair of the stop. The platforms (surface) as well as the interior of the stop (ceilings, walls and roof) will undergo reconstruction. The work started in the first quarter and continued for 6 months. During the reconstruction, there were minor traffic measures, but the stop was not closed. During the summer and autumn of 2023, the boarding edges were raised slightly and the surface of the platforms was replaced with concrete paving with guiding elements for the visually impaired or blind. Originally, it was supposed to be interlocking paving.
