= Banská Bystrica mesto railway station =

Railway station in Banská Bystrica, Slovakia

Banská Bystrica mesto
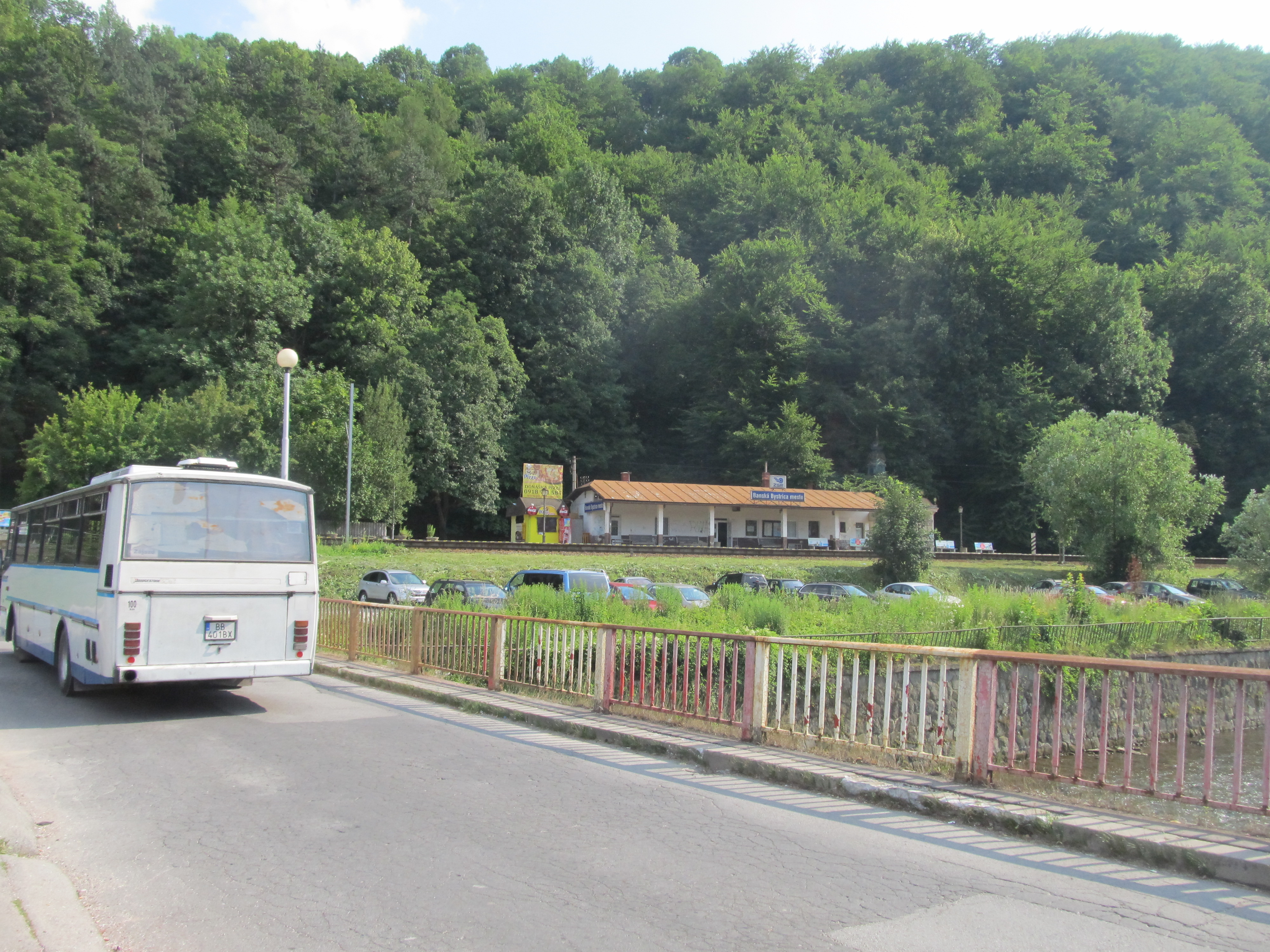
- View of the station building, 2012

General information
- Location: Banská Bystrica; Banská Bystrica; Banská Bystrica Region; Slovakia
- Coordinates: 48°43′53″N 19°08′48″E
- Owner: Železnice Slovenskej republiky
- Operator: Železnice Slovenskej republiky
- Line: Vrútky–Zvolen
- Connections: Buses
Location
- Location within Slovakia

Banská Bystrica mesto railway station (Slovak: Železničná stanica Banská Bystrica mesto) serves the city of Banská Bystrica in central Slovakia.

== History ==
The station was opened on 3 September 1873 as Banská Bystrica Svätý Jan (Hungarian: Besztercebánya Szt. János) together with the rest of the Zvolen–Banská Bystrica section of the Vrútky–Zvolen railway.

== Services ==
The station is owned by Železnice Slovenskej republiky (ŽSR); passenger train services are operated by Železničná spoločnosť Slovensko (ZSSK).

Preceding station	ŽSSK	Following station
Sliač kúpele toward Bratislava	Regional fast trains	Banská Bystrica; Terminus
Radvaň toward Zvolen	Stopping trains	Banská Bystrica; Terminus

== See also ==
- History of rail transport in Slovakia
- Rail transport in Slovakia
