= Volksstimme =

Volksstimme (People's Voice) is the name of several newspapers:

- Volksstimme (Saxony-Anhalt), published in Magdeburg since 1980
- Volksstimme (Austrian newspaper), newspaper of the Communist Party of Austria
- Westungarische Volksstimme
- Elbinger Volksstimme
