= Banská Bystrica railway station =

Railway station in Banská Bystrica, Slovakia

Banská Bystrica
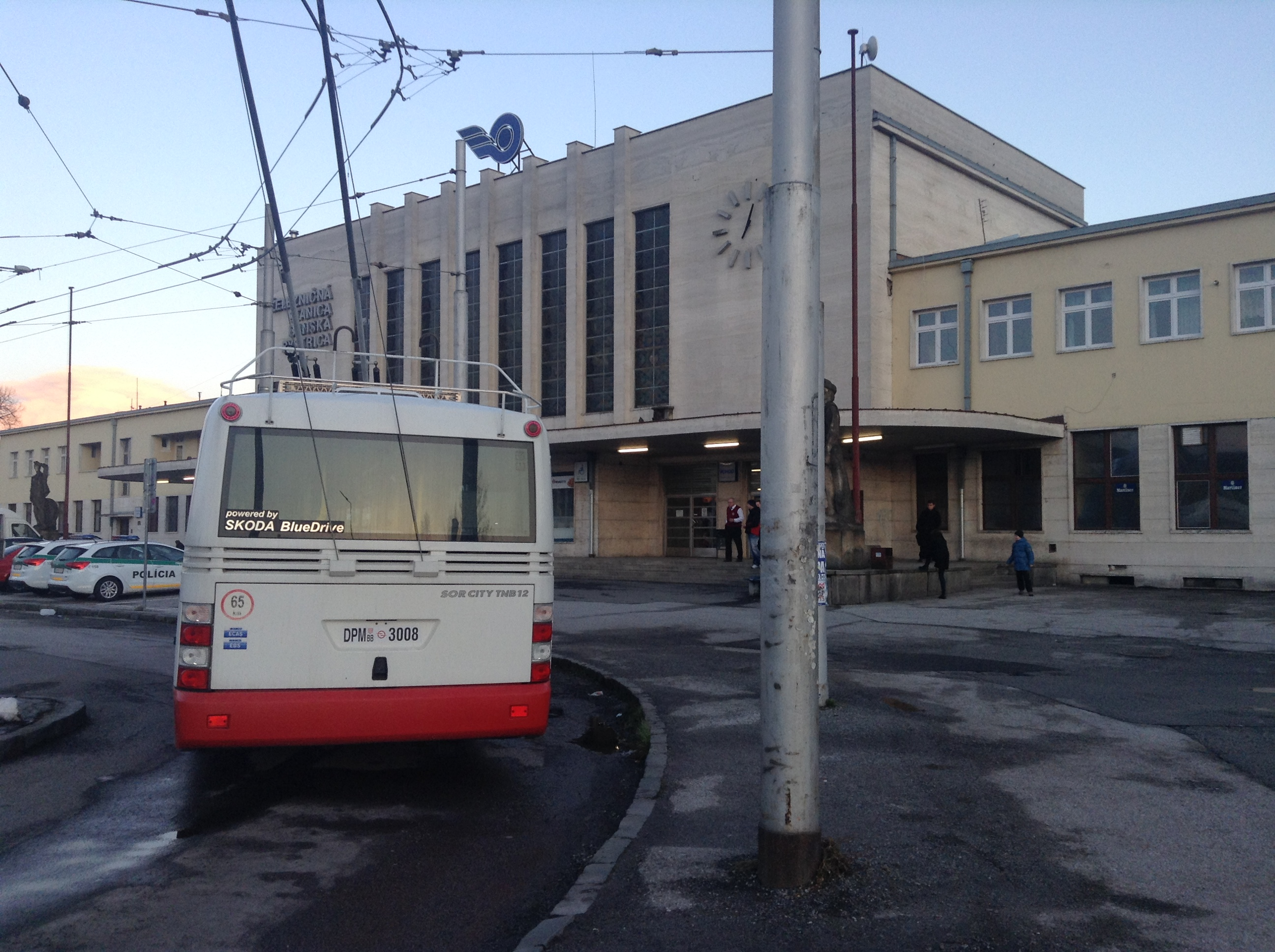

General information
- Location: 29. Augusta; 97401 Banská Bystrica; Banská Bystrica; Banská Bystrica; Banská Bystrica Region; Slovakia
- Coordinates: 48°44′07″N 19°09′48″E
- Owner: Železnice Slovenskej republiky
- Operator: Železnice Slovenskej republiky
- Lines: Vrútky–Zvolen; Banská Bystrica–Červená Skala
- Distance: 21.383 km (13.287 mi) from Zvolen
- Connections: Buses

History
- Opened: 1873
Location
- Location within Slovakia

Banská Bystrica railway station (Slovak: Železničná stanica Banská Bystrica) serves the city and municipality of Banská Bystrica, seat of the Banská Bystrica Region, central Slovakia.

Opened in 1873, the station is a junction between the Vrútky–Zvolen railway and the Banská Bystrica–Červená Skala railway.

The station is currently owned by Železnice Slovenskej republiky (ŽSR); train services are operated by Železničná spoločnosť Slovensko (ZSSK). Banská Bystrica railway station is situated at the southern end of 29. Augusta, on the edge of the city centre.

== History ==
The station was opened on 3 September 1873, together with the rest of the Zvolen–Banská Bystrica section of the Vrútky–Zvolen railway. On 26 July 1884, the station became a through station, upon the inauguration of the Banská Bystrica–Brezno section of the Banská Bystrica–Červená Skala railway.

It was not until 19 December 1940 that the Banská Bystrica–Dolná Štubňa section of the Vrútky–Zvolen railway was opened, thus completing the construction of that railway, and simultaneously transforming Banská Bystrica into a junction.

== Lines ==
- 170 Vrútky–Zvolen
- 172 Banská Bystrica–Červená Skala

Preceding station	ŽSSK	Following station
Terminus	Regional fast trains	Horná Štubňa obec toward Žilina
Banská Bystrica mesto toward Bratislava	Regional fast trains	Terminus
Banská Bystrica mesto toward Zvolen	Stopping trains	Šalková toward Brezno
Terminus	Regional Express	Medzibrod toward Margecany

== See also ==
- History of rail transport in Slovakia
- Rail transport in Slovakia
