= Parndorf–Bratislava railway line =

Railway line in Slovakia and Austria

Parndorf–Bratislava
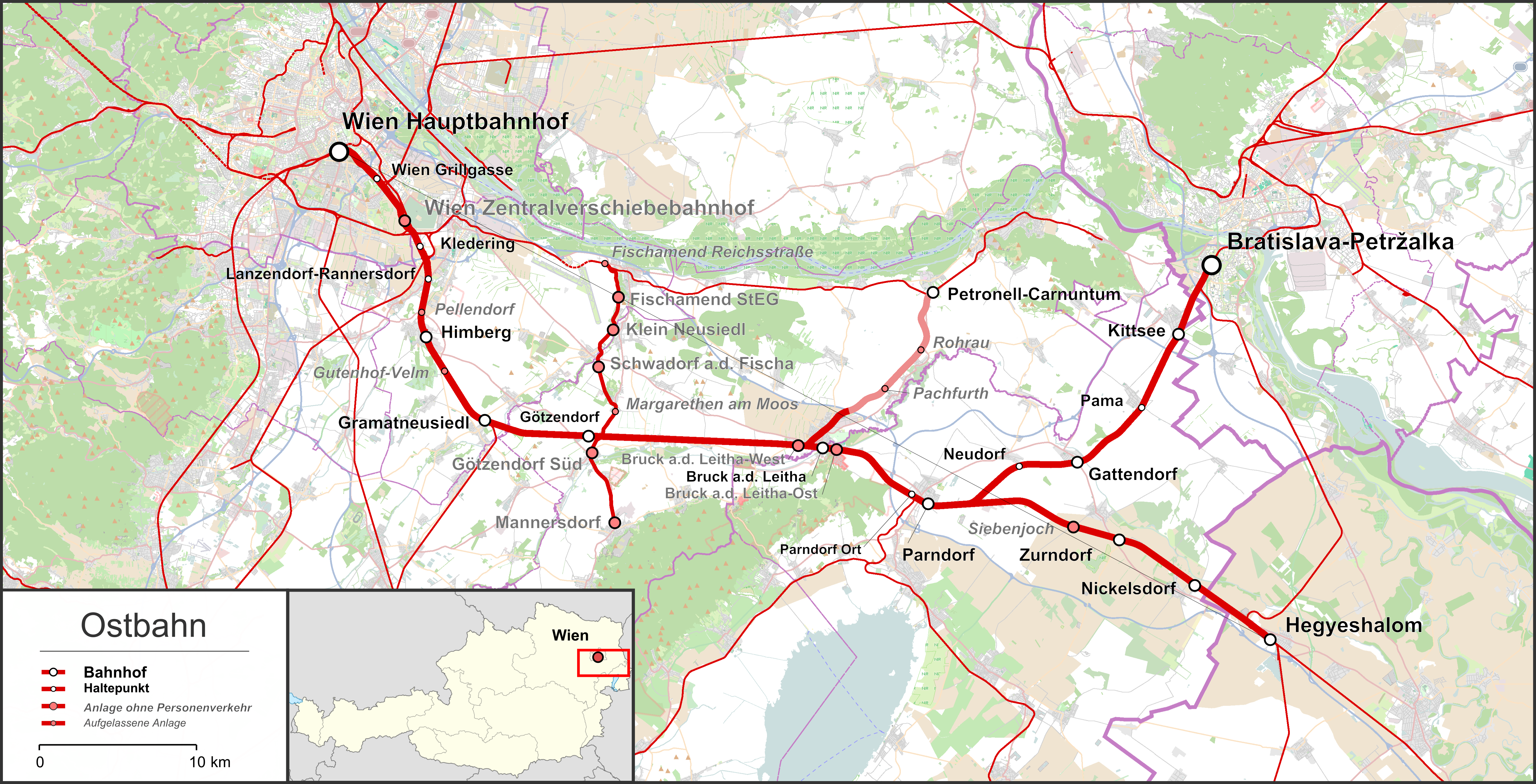
- Route map of the Eastern Railway, including the Parndorf–Bratislava railway line

Overview
- Owner: ÖBB; ZSR

History
- Opened: 18 December 1897

Technical
- Line length: 24.8 km (15.4 mi)
- Number of tracks: 1
- Track gauge: 1,435 mm (4 ft 8 1/2 in) standard gauge
- Electrification: 15 kV 16.7 Hz AC

The Parndorf–Bratislava railway line is a railway line in Austria and Slovakia. It branches off the Eastern Railway in Parndorf and runs 24.8 kilometres (15.4 mi) northeast to Bratislava.

== Route ==
The Parndorf–Bratislava railway line branches off from the Eastern Railway east of Parndorf railway station. It is single-tracked and electrified at 15 kV 16.7 Hz AC. The line runs northeast, crossing the river Leitha before entering Slovakia. It runs parallel to the Bratislava–Hegyeshalom railway line before terminating at Bratislava-Petržalka.

== History ==
The line originally opened on 18 December 1897. At the time, the line was located within the borders of Austria-Hungary. The line was split between Austria and Czechoslovakia after World War I. Cross-border service ended during World War II, and passenger service on the Austrian portion of the line ended in 1951. The line was electrified and re-opened for through passenger service on 15 December 1998.

== Operation ==
The line hosts hourly Regional-Express services between Wien Hauptbahnhof and Bratislava-Petržalka. Direct services between Vienna and Bratislava main use the Marchegger Ostbahn.
