= Paul Wittich (politician) =

Czechoslovak politician (1877–1957)

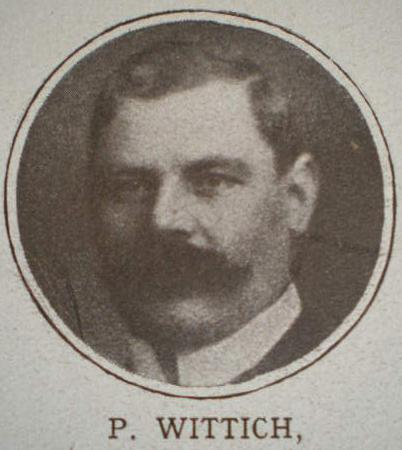
Paul Wittich

Paul Wittich (1877–1957) was a Carpathian German social democratic politician in Slovakia (then part of Austria-Hungary and later Czechoslovakia). He was a prominent labour leader in Pressburg (today known as Bratislava). During a few days around New Year's Eve 1919, he led a workers militia that vied for control of the city. After the integration of Pressburg into Czechoslovakia, he sat in the national parliament.

== Volkstimme editor ==
Wittich emerged as the main leader of the social democratic movement in Pressburg following the departure of Heinrich Kalmár to Budapest. Wittich was the editor of the weekly newspaper Westungarische Volkstimme (a regional organ of the Social Democratic Party of Hungary) between July 1905 and May 1914, and then again from September 1914 to 1918.

In 1907 Wittich was imprisoned after having called for reform of the electoral system.

== Town Council member ==
In November 1914 Wittich was elected to the Pressburg town council, being the first social democrat to be able to win a seat in that body. His constituency was the Theresienstadt ward, an urban working class and multi-cultural district with a large Jewish population. Wittich's campaign had three main themes; the introduction of a progressive income and property tax, autonomy from central and county government control and electoral reform (seeking to scrap the system that automatically accorded seats to the 'virilists').

== Militia leader ==
At the end of the First World War, Wittich emerged as a key political leader in the city. In the first week of November 1918, the German-Hungarian Workers Council was formed, with Wittich as its leader. Soon thereafter, Wittich represented the Pressburg National Council and Pressburg at a meeting with the Hungarian National Council in Budapest. On 9 November 1918 Wittich was part of a delegation that met with the Czechoslovak envoy Vlastimil Tusar in Vienna, to discuss the future of Pressburg.

On 15 December 1918, Wittich was one of the key speakers at a mass meeting of ethnic Germans, held in connection with the launching of the German Volksrat of Pressburg (a national platform of the German population of the city). On 19 December 1918, Wittich was elected to the presidium of the Volksrat, representing the Workers Council. On the same day, the Volksrat Presidium adopted a unanimous resolution, appealing to the population of Pressburg not to resist the imminent Czechoslovak occupation of the city. Wittich was reported to have opposed this position, seeing it as too defeatist, but nevertheless signed it. Wittich also travelled to Prague to negotiate the terms of the Czechoslovak occupation.

Around Christmas Eve 1918, chaos engulfed Pressburg. Wittich was approached by the vice-mayor Richard Kánya and some police officers, asking him to take charge of security in the city. On 30 December 1918 Wittich assumed the title of People's Commissar, supported by the Workers Council and the Volksrat. An Arbeitergarde ('Workers Guard') was formed under his command, with a few hundred men.

Around New Year's Eve Wittich's Arbeitergarde clashed with Red Guards over the control of the city. Whilst the social democratic press sought to present Wittich as the saviour of the town, the rival Christian Social press tried to portray the Arbeitergarde as a band of looters.

== Czechoslovak occupation ==
On 1 January 1919 Wittich led the Pressburg delegation at a negotiation with Entente officers, led by the Italian Colonel Barreca, at the Pressburg railway station. Wittich demanded that Barreca respect civil liberties. An agreement was reached that Czechoslovak troops, Arbeitergarde and police would control the city jointly. On 2 January 1919, after Pressburg had been seized by Czechoslovak troops, Wittich (in his function as People's Commissar) and the acting mayor Kánya issued a joint appeal. The appeal, in German and Hungarian, was distributed throughout the city. It called on the citizenry to remain calm, that the population of the city had protested occupation and that the status of the city would be solved through diplomacy.

On 4 January 1919 Wittich resigned as People's Commissar at a Pressburg town council meeting.

== February Strike ==
In the following February Strike of 1919, Wittich played a leading role, as the main leader of the German-Hungarian labour movement in the city. Initially, condemned the policies of the Czechoslovak government as 'imperialist' and 'militarist'. Soon thereafter, he came to project the strike as solely related to economic issues, and appealed to the Slovak social democrats to join the strike. He led the worker's delegation in negotiations with the Czechoslovak government on 9–10 February 1919. Wittich was later arrested by the Pressburg police, accused of being a 'Bolshevik' agent and preparing an armed putsch. Wittich was released. On 23 February 1919, he addressed a mass meeting of unemployed people in Pressburg.

== Political prisoner ==
On 25 March 1919, following the proclamation of the Hungarian Soviet Republic, martial law was introduced in Slovakia. Wittich was amongst the social democratic leaders arrested, accused of being a Bolshevik agent. He was detained at the Ilava prison. He was released on 15 May 1919.

== Parliamentarian ==
Wittich became a leading figure in the Hungarian-German Social Democratic Party, founded in Czechoslovakia in 1919. He was elected to the Czechoslovak National Assembly in the 1920 election. He became the chairman of the parliamentary group of the Hungarian-German Social Democratic Party.

== Cracks in the party ==
The socialist movement in Bratislava was radicalized, as Hungarian revolutionaries settled in Czechoslovakia in large numbers. A party meeting was held on 11 and 18 July 1920. The meeting approved a proposal by F. Pfifferling to adhere to the Communist International. Wittich, who had denounced the Hungarian Soviet Republic at the meeting, was deposed from his leadership position in the party. This was Wittich's first mayor political setback. A party congress was convened on 24 September 1920, Wittich was expelled for not having supported the Communist International.

The Marxist grouping eventually merged with the Communist Party of Czechoslovakia. The social democratic minority re-organized the party. Wittich did however break with the party in late 1920.

== Bibliography ==
- Karl Bosl, Collegium Carolinum (Munich, Germany). Die erste Tschechoslowakische Republik als multinationaler Parteienstaat: Vorträge d. Tagungen d. Collegium Carolinum in Bad Wiessee vom 24.-27. November 1977 u. vom 20.-23. April 1978. München: Oldenbourg, 1979. ISBN 3-486-49181-4
- Pieter van Duin. Central European Crossroads: Social Democracy and National Revolution in Bratislava (Pressburg), 1867–1921. New York: Berghahn Books, 2009 ISBN 1-84545-395-6
