= Hungarian-German Social Democratic Party =

- German name: Ungarisch-Deutsche Partei der Sozialdemokraten
- Hungarian name: Magyar és Német Szociál-Demokrata Párt
- Chairman of the parliamentary group: Paul Wittich
- Founded: 1919
- Dissolved: January 1, 1927
- Merged into: Czechoslovak Social Democratic Workers Party
- Newspaper: Volksstimme, Népszava
- Ideology: Socialism
- International affiliation: Labour and Socialist International

The Hungarian-German Social Democratic Party (German: Ungarisch-Deutsche Partei der Sozialdemokraten, Hungarian: Magyar és Német Szociál-Demokrata Párt) was a social democratic political party in Slovakia (part of Czechoslovakia at the time). It was founded in 1919 by social democrats from ethnic minority communities. The party had a German and a Hungarian section. The German and Hungarian social democrats in Slovakia had developed an antagonistic relationship with the Slovak social democrats, who had merged into the Czechoslovak Social Democratic Workers Party as Austria-Hungary was broken up after the First World War. Issues of contention between Hungarian/German and Slovak social democrats included views of the February Strike of 1919 and the Hungarian Soviet Republic (which the Slovak social democrats considered a threat to their new state).

Like the other Hungarian parties in Czechoslovakia at the time, the Hungarian-German Social Democratic Party opposed the very existence of the Czechoslovak Republic.

Leaders of the party included Sam Mayer, Gyula Nagy (between 1919 and 1922), Géza Borovszky (from 1922 onwards) and Jószef Földessy.

== 1920 election ==
The party congress held January 18, 1920 resolved that the party would contest the 1920 Czechoslovak National Assembly election independently. The party contested the Chamber of Deputies election in the Nové Zámky 16th electoral district and the Košice 20th electoral district. However, the party contested the Senate election on a joint list with the Czechoslovak Social Democratic Workers Party.

The election campaign was initiated in March 1920. On March 16, 1920 a brief general strike was organized in Bratislava, to support socialist demands after the elections. Banners with slogans like "Death to profiteers" and "Long live communism" were put up in the city. The party got 1.8% of the votes in Czechoslovakia. The main stronghold of the party was the Nové Zámky electoral district (which included Bratislava). In the Nové Zámky constituency, the party won 35.7% of the National Assembly vote. It mustered 110,282 votes in the constituency, winning four seat in the National Assembly.

Paul Wittich, who had been the chairman of the Pressburg Workers Council, became the chairman of the parliamentary faction of the party. The three other parliamentarians of the party were Samuel Mayer, Dr. Jószef Földessy and Gyula Nagy. Wittich, Mayer and Nagy were elected from Bratislava, whilst Földessy was elected from Komárno.

The party also won two seats in the Czechoslovak Senate from Bratislava, represented by Matthias Kreppenhofer and Antal Svrak.

== Press ==
The Hungarian section of the party published a weekly newspaper, Népszava ('People's Voice'), whilst the German organ was Volksstimme ('People's Voice').

== International affiliation ==
The party was affiliated to the Labour and Socialist International between 1923 and 1926.

== Factionalism and disintegration ==
The socialist movement in Bratislava was radicalized, as Hungarian revolutionaries settled in Czechoslovakia in large numbers. A party meeting was held on July 11 and 18, 1920. The meeting approved a proposal by F. Pfifferling to adhere to the Communist International. Népszava and Volksstimme became pro-communist organs. Wittich, who had denounced the Hungarian Soviet Republic at the meeting, was deposed from his leadership position. A party congress was convened on September 24, 1920, at which the old leadership (Wittich, Mayer and August Masár) was expelled. The Marxist grouping eventually merged with the Communist Party of Czechoslovakia.

The social democratic minority re-organized themselves. In October 1920, they launched new newspapers in German (Volksrecht) and Hungarian. On November 20, 1920, a German Social Democratic Party was formed (led by Wittich, Mayer and Masár), and on December 4, 1920 the small group of Hungarian social democrats that hadn't joined the communists formed the Hungarian Social Democratic Party. The Hungarian-German party thus consisted of two national sections.

However, starting from the end of 1920 members of the German section of the party began defecting to the German Social Democratic Workers Party in the Czechoslovak Republic (DSAP). The two German parliamentarians, Wittich and Mayer, were amongst those who left the party in late 1920. As of 1926 the German section had been completely absorbed by DSAP. On January 1, 1927 the Hungarian remainder of the party merged into the Czechoslovak Social Democratic Workers Party, becoming a Hungarian section of the Czechoslovak party.

== Election results ==
Chamber of Deputies
Date	Votes			Seats		Position	Size
Date	No.	%	± pp	No.	±	Position	Size
1920	108,546	1.75	New	4 / 281	New	Extra-parliamentary	13th

Senate
Date	Votes			Seats		Position	Size
Date	No.	%	± pp	No.	±	Position	Size
1920							
