= Bratislava-Petržalka railway station =

Railway station in Slovakia

Bratislava-Petržalka
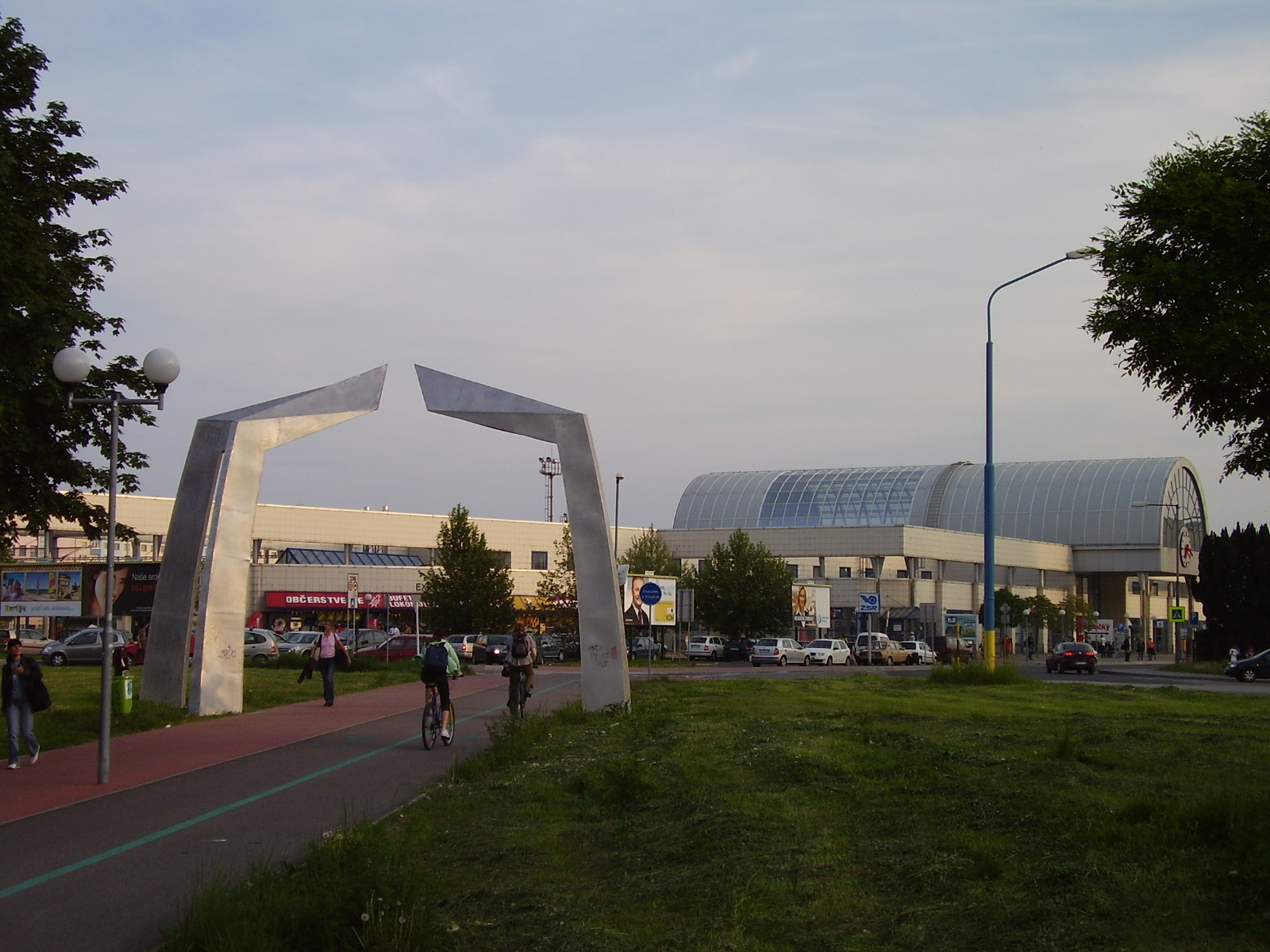
- Bratislava-Petržalka railway station

General information
- Location: Kopčianska; 85101 Petržalka; Petržalka; Bratislava V Bratislava Region; Slovakia
- Coordinates: 48°07′20″N 17°05′55″E
- Owner: Železnice Slovenskej republiky (ŽSR)
- Operator: Železnice Slovenskej republiky
- Lines: Parndorf–Bratislava; Bratislava–Hegyeshalom

History
- Opened: 1897
- Rebuilt: 1998
Location
- Location within Slovakia

Bratislava-Petržalka railway station is a station in Petržalka, the southern part of Bratislava. The station was built in 1897. The station was rebuilt in the 1990s as a terminus for international trains to and from Vienna, which restarted in 1999 after having stopped in 1945. Shuttle trains between the station and Wien Hauptbahnhof operate approximately once per hour.

The station is a connection point between the southern Slovak 25 kV/50 Hz electrification and Austrian 15 kV/16.7 Hz.

Public transport bus line No. 80 connects the station with the city center and No. 93 (it is necessary to use station's underpass to get to the stop of No. 93) connects the station with Bratislava main railway station where it is possible to transfer to line No. 61 to the M. R. Štefánik Airport or to line No. 210 to the central bus station at Mlynské Nivy.

== Gallery ==
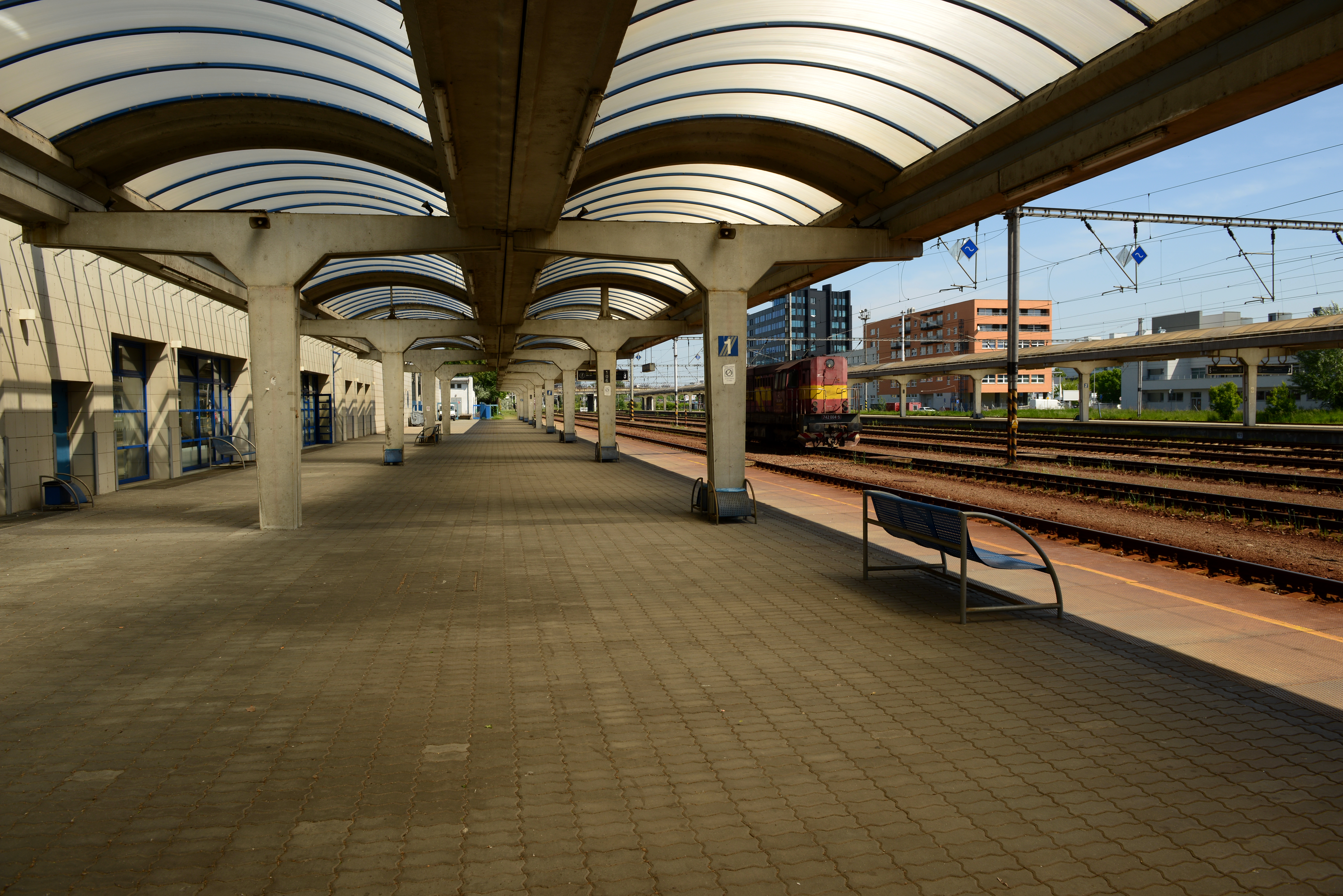

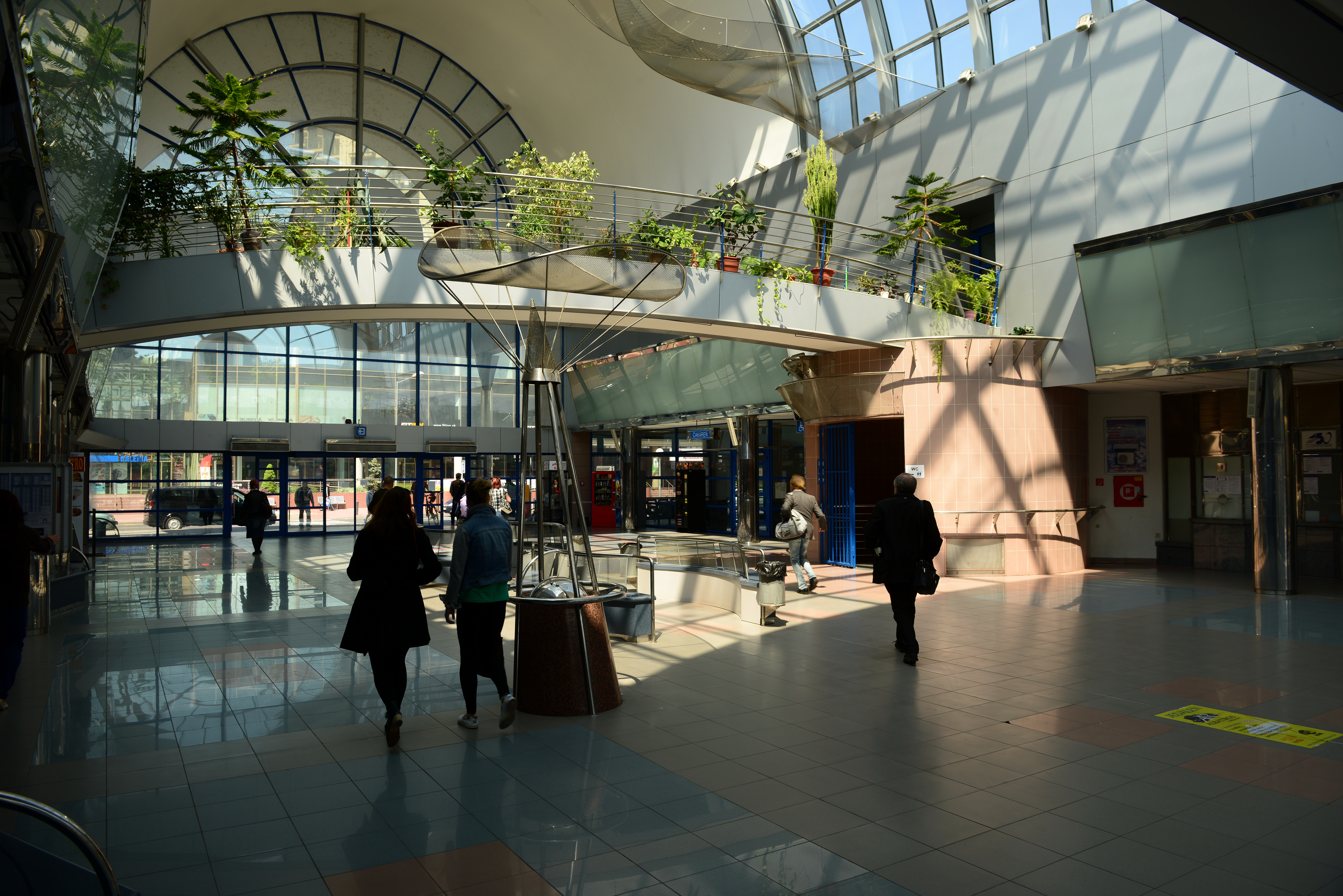

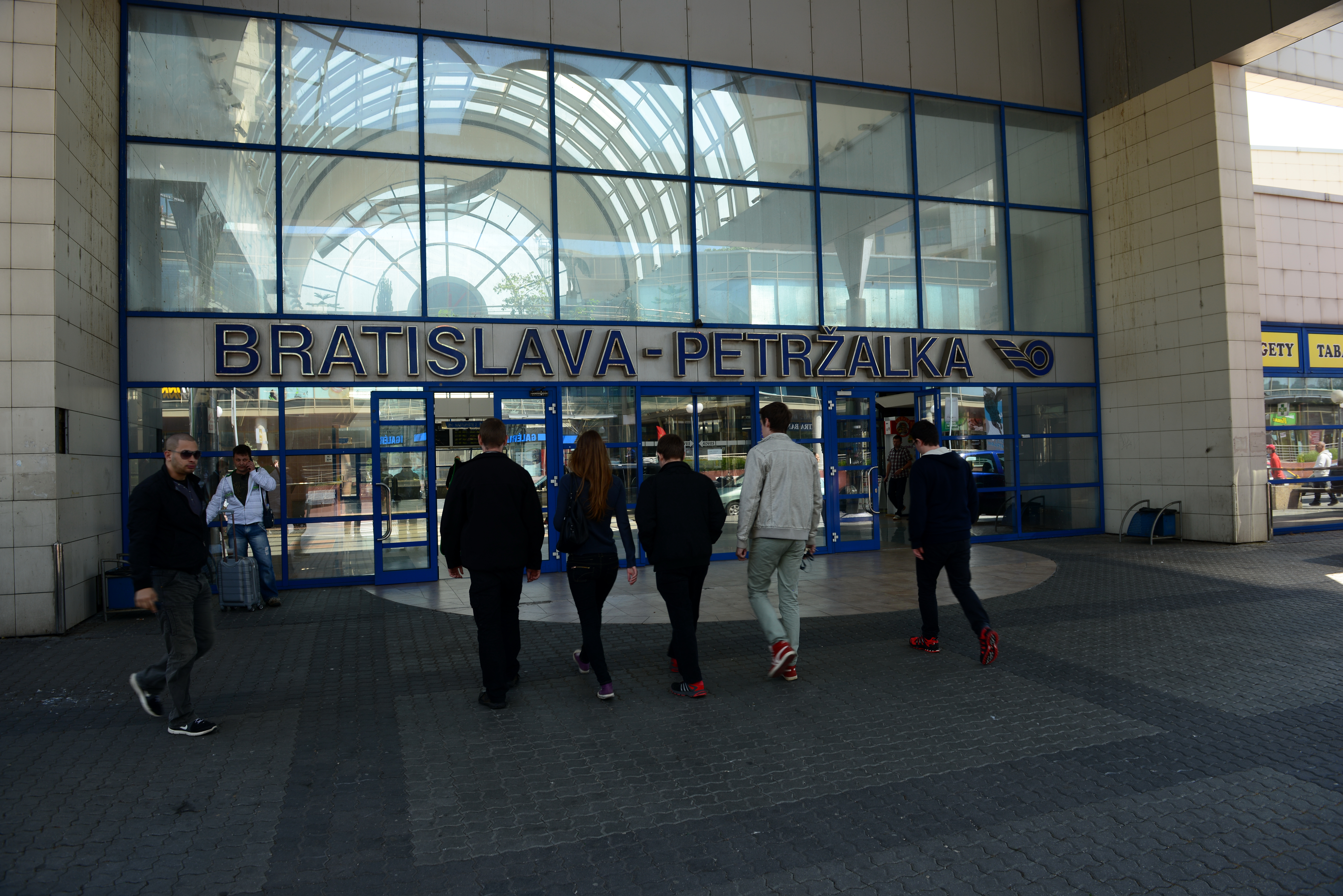
