= Westungarische Volksstimme =

Defunct German-language weekly newspaper

Westungarische Volksstimme ('West Hungarian People's Voice') was a German-language weekly newspaper published from Pressburg (Kingdom of Hungary, Austria-Hungary; later Bratislava, Czechoslovakia).

The first issue was published on March 18, 1902. Westungarische Volkstimme was a regional organ of the Social Democratic Party of Hungary. The name was inspired by the central party organ Volksstimme, published from Budapest.

Heinrich E. Kalmár was the founding editor of the newspaper. Paul Wittich then served as editor between July 1905 and May 1914, and then again from September 1914 onwards. Kalmár and Jozef Balbam served as editors between May and September 1914 Samuel Mayer served as editor of the newspaper around 1918.

The by-line of the newspaper was 'Organ of the Social Democratic Party of Hungary for the working population in West Hungary' (Organ der ungarländischen socialdemokratischen Partei für die arbeitende Bevölkerung in Westungarn). Westungarische Volksstimme had a Hungarian-language sister newspaper, Népszava (also meaning 'People's Voice').

After the incorporation of Pressburg into Czechoslovakia, the Czechoslovak government ordered the newspaper to remove "Westungarische" from its name. This move caused resentment amongst the Hungarian and German social democrats of the city. Volksstimme became an organ of the Hungarian-German Social Democratic Party after the First World War. Westungarische Volksstimme got a Hungarian-language sister newspaper in Bratislava, Népszava (also meaning 'People's Voice').

In 1920 control of Volkstimme and Népszava was taken over by the pro-communist leftwing that emerged from the Hungarian-German Social Democratic Party. The Austrian-born leftist leader F. Pfifferling became the editor of the newspaper. The social democratic faction led by Wittich established a new newspaper in October 1920, Volksrecht ('People's Right').

== Bibliography ==
- Pieter van Duin. Central European Crossroads: Social Democracy and National Revolution in Bratislava (Pressburg), 1867–1921. New York: Berghahn Books, 2009 ISBN 1845453956
