= Zvolen osobná railway station =

Main railway station in Zvolen, Slovakia

Zvolen osobná stanica
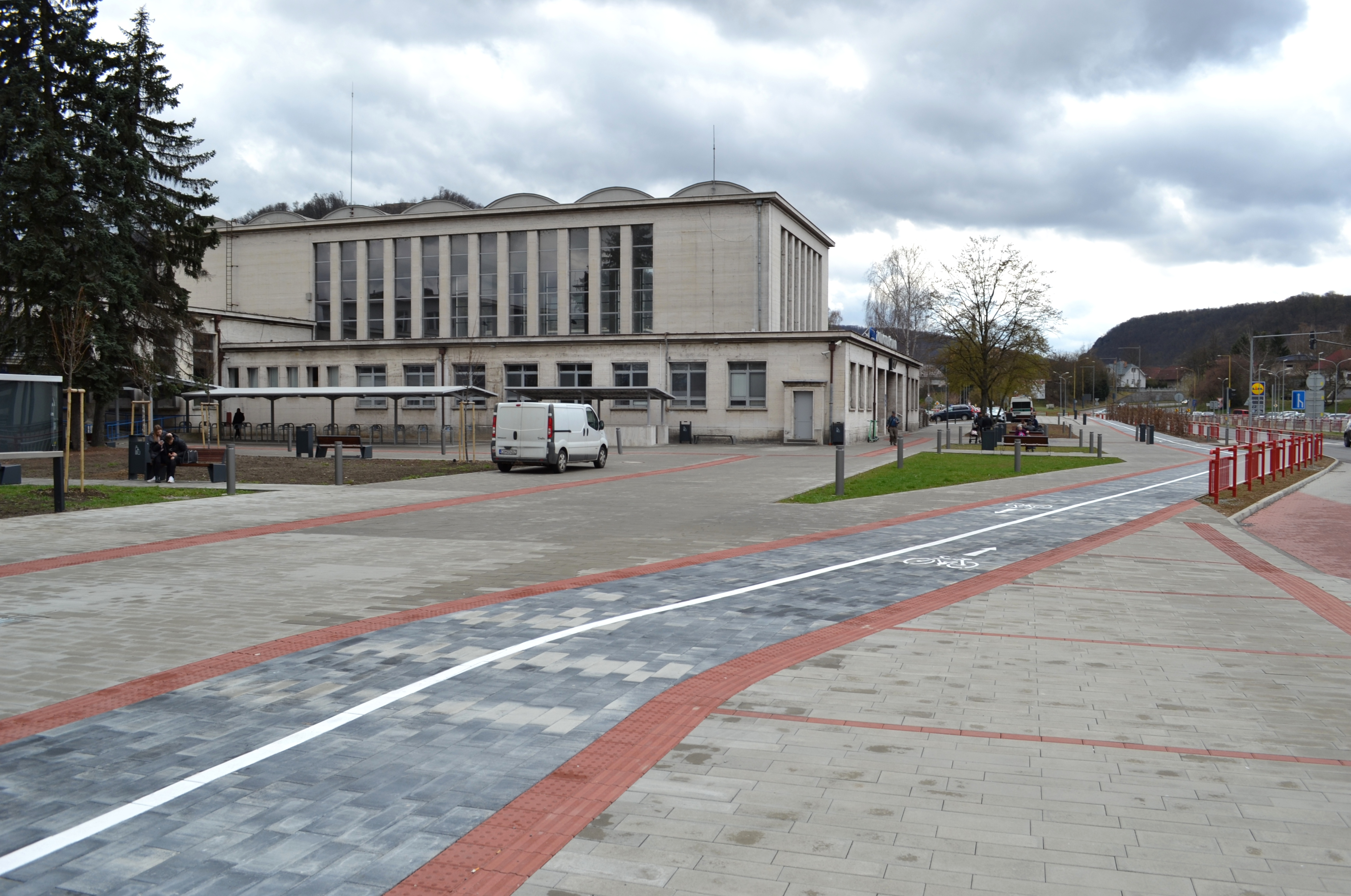
- The station main hall, 2022

General information
- Other names: Zvolen hlavná stanica
- Location: T. G. Masaryka; 966 01 Zvolen; Zvolen; Zvolen District; Banská Bystrica Region; Slovakia
- Coordinates: 48°34′12″N 19°07′12″E
- Elevation: 304 m (997 ft)
- System: Central station
- Owner: Železnice Slovenskej republiky
- Operator: Železnice Slovenskej republiky
- Lines: Zvolen – Nové Zámky (line 150); Zvolen – Čata (line 153); Zvolen – Košice (line 160); Zvolen – Vrútky (line 170); Zvolen – Diviaky (line 171)
- Distance: 21.383 km (13.287 mi) from Banská Bystrica
- Platforms: 4 (+ 1a)
- Tracks: 39
- Connections: Buses (national and international); Buses (city); Taxi

Construction
- Structure type: at-grade
- Parking: yes
- Accessible: yes
- Architect: Jozef Lacko

History
- Opened: 1959; 67 years ago
- Rebuilt: 2020–2022 (renovation)
Location
- Location within Slovakia

Zvolen osobná stanica (literally 'Zvolen passenger station', abbreviated Zvolen os.st.; Hungarian: Zólyom-személyi pályaudvar), colloquially known as Zvolen hlavná stanica, is the main passenger railway station serving the city of Zvolen, Zvolen District, located in Banská Bystrica Region, central Slovakia. It is an important railway junction in Slovakia.

== Etymology ==
The station is named osobná stanica (passenger station) to differentiate it from Zvolen nákladná stanica, a large freight terminal a short distance east, which is also served by some local stopping trains.

Zvolen osobná stanica was previously called "Zvolen Hrad station" (prior to 1959) and "Zvolen osobné nádraží" (between 1959 - 1972).

== Location ==
Zvolen osobná railway station is located southwest from the city centre on the northern bank of the Slatina river and is accessible from T. G. Masaryka street.

There is a bus station across the street, offering access to local and intercity buses.

== Present day ==
Zvolen railway station currently serves as a main railway junction connecting the southern route (between Bratislava and Košice) with other cities such as Šahy, Levice, Banská Bystrica and Vrútky. Trains of all national categories (Os, R, RR, REX) stop at the station. For most national train lines, the station is the terminating or departing station. The REX category has been operating specifically between Zvolen and Banská Bystrica since 2022 to speed up transport between the two cities.

The main station is divided into passenger and cargo parts. There is a mailing station right next to Zvolen osobná railway station, which is connected to train rails as well.

=== Other stations ===
There are also two smaller stations in Zvolen:

- Zvolen mesto (direction to Banská Bystrica), north of Zvolen osobná railway station, closer to the town centre
- Zvolen nákladná stanica (direction to Košice), east of Zvolen osobná railway station, serves primarily for freight trains

=== ŽOS Zvolen ===
The Zvolen railway junction also includes railway workshops, which today function as an independent production and repair company of ŽOS Zvolen rail vehicles.

=== Armored train Hurban ===
The replica armored train Hurban is displayed close to the station which was an armored train used during World War II, during the Slovak National uprising.

== Platforms ==
There are 4 platforms (+ 1a) in the station. Platforms 1 and 1a are accessible from the main station building and from both underpasses, platforms 2–4 are "island" based and are accessible via both underpasses.

Each platform has a lift, serving primarily for wheelchair access.

Platform 1a elongates the first platform, which serves longer trains (usually of categories R or RR).

== History ==
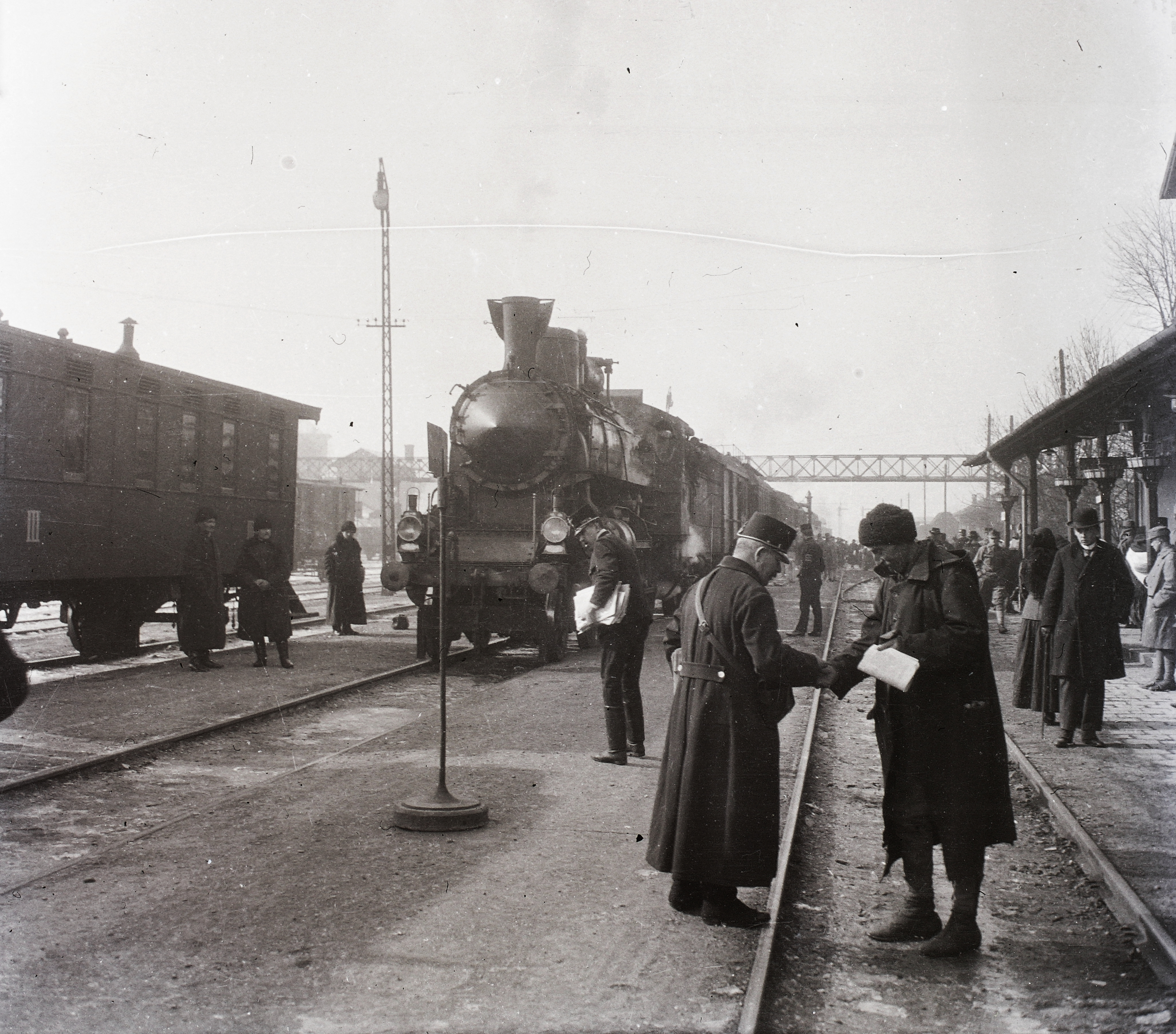
Old main railway station (today serves for freight trains, 1915)

=== First rails ===
At the beginning of the 1860s, coal consumption in Hungary began to grow significantly. In May 1861, the St. Stephen's Coal Mining Company was established, which sought to exploit the coal reserves of the Salgotarjan Coalfield. To ensure the transport of the coal extracted from this district, the General Assembly of this company in 1861 decided to build the railway Lučenec – Fiľakovo – Salgótarián – Pázstó – Hatvan – Aszód – Isaszeg – Pest and applied for a concession for this railway. On January 19, 1863, the newly established The Pest-Lučenec-Banská Bystrica Railway and Satoštofan Coal Mining Company was granted a concession, which obliged the association to build a railway in the Pest – Lučenec section until 1866 and to continue the line in the Lučenec – Banská Bystrica section until 1870.

=== First station ===
Because the private company had problems raising capital and financing the construction, in 1868 the company was bought by the state and the line was renamed the Hungarian Northern Railway and the construction of the railway in today's Slovakia was intensified. At the same time, it was decided to build a connection between this line and the Košice-Bohumín railway under construction on the Zvolen – Hronská Dúbrava – Kremnica – Vrútky route. The section Salgótarián – Fiľakovo – Lučenec was put into operation on May 4, 1871, Zvolen was put into operation a month later – June 18, 1871, when the section Lučenec – Zvolen was put into operation. An important traffic junction was destined for the construction of a railway depot, which provided the background for technology. Zvolen became an important railway hub and important industrial centre.

=== New station ===
The current passenger station began construction in 1952 [1] on the site of the original Zvolen – Hrad stop. Work on the new passenger station was completed in 1963, and was put into operation during construction (1959), which significantly relieved the original main railway station in Zvolen, which began to serve primarily for the needs of rail freight, which was also adapted its name on Zvolen – freight station.

== Reconstruction ==
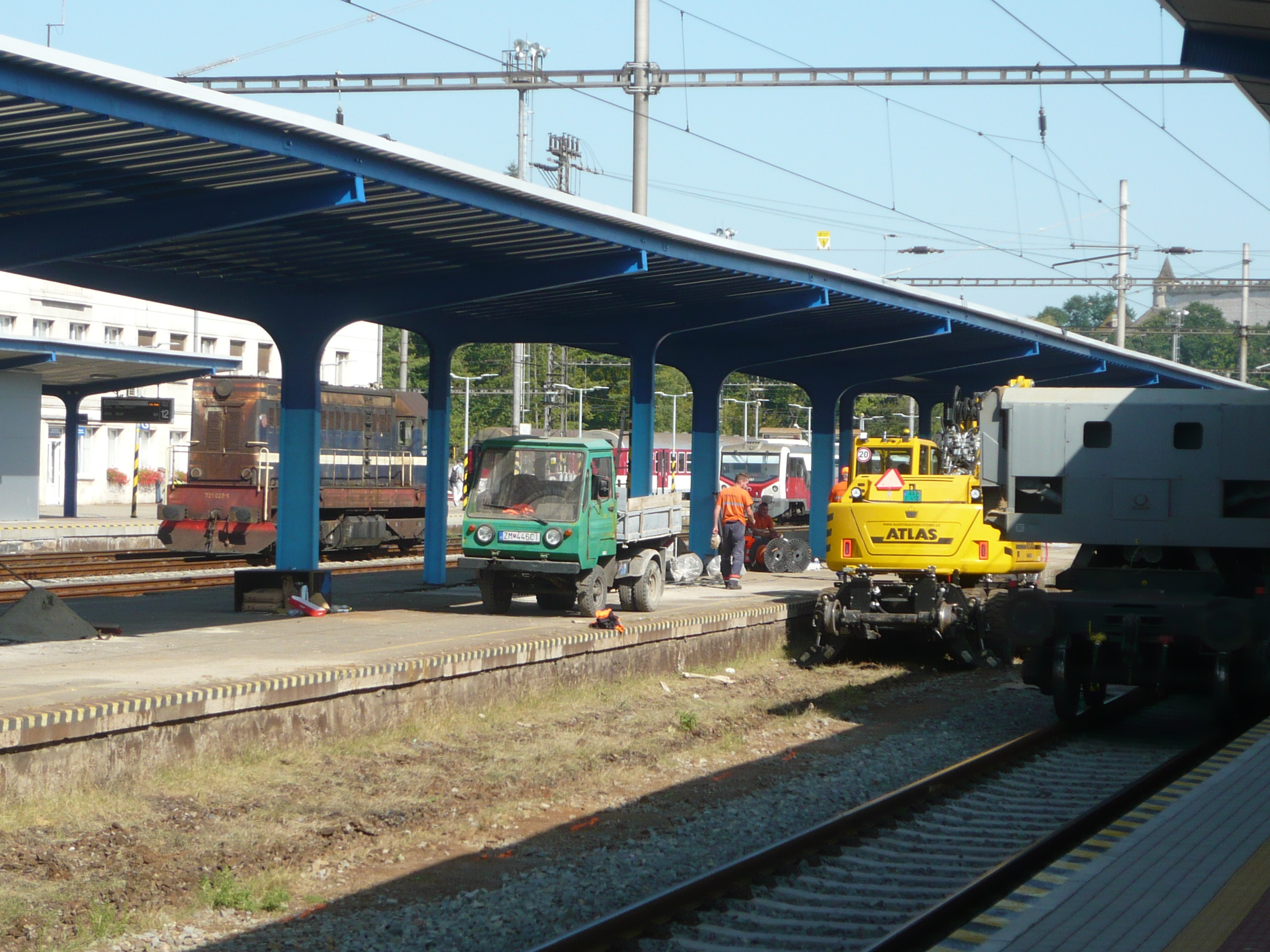
Reconstruction of the 2nd platform

Reconstruction of the station building to its current form began in 2019 and was completed in 2022. Reconstruction of the station included the modernization of the main passenger railway station in Zvolen, which includes the installation of a camera system and new elevators on each of the platforms, which should ensure barrier-free transfer for immobile passengers throughout the railway station. The reconstruction also included the redesign of the platforms themselves. There was also an reseeding of tracks near the station. The existing Internet connection was also modified, the HaVIS information equipment (voice and visual train information) was expanded and reloaded, and a new electronic security system and electric fire alarm system were built.

At the same time, the city of Zvolen reconstructed the area and park located in front of the passenger station itself from 2020 to 2022, which changed the dispositional connection of the pedestrian infrastructure to the main bus station, but also the platform of public transport. New parking spaces for motor vehicles have also been added, as well as bicycle stands for passengers and visitors to the city. The mineral spring near the station was also reconstructed (by draining mineral waters).

Since 2022, a new modern technical and hygienic train maintenance center has been under construction, which is also to be established in Nové Zámky, Košice and Humenné. It is located near the building of the Main Passenger Railway Station in Zvolen.

== Services ==
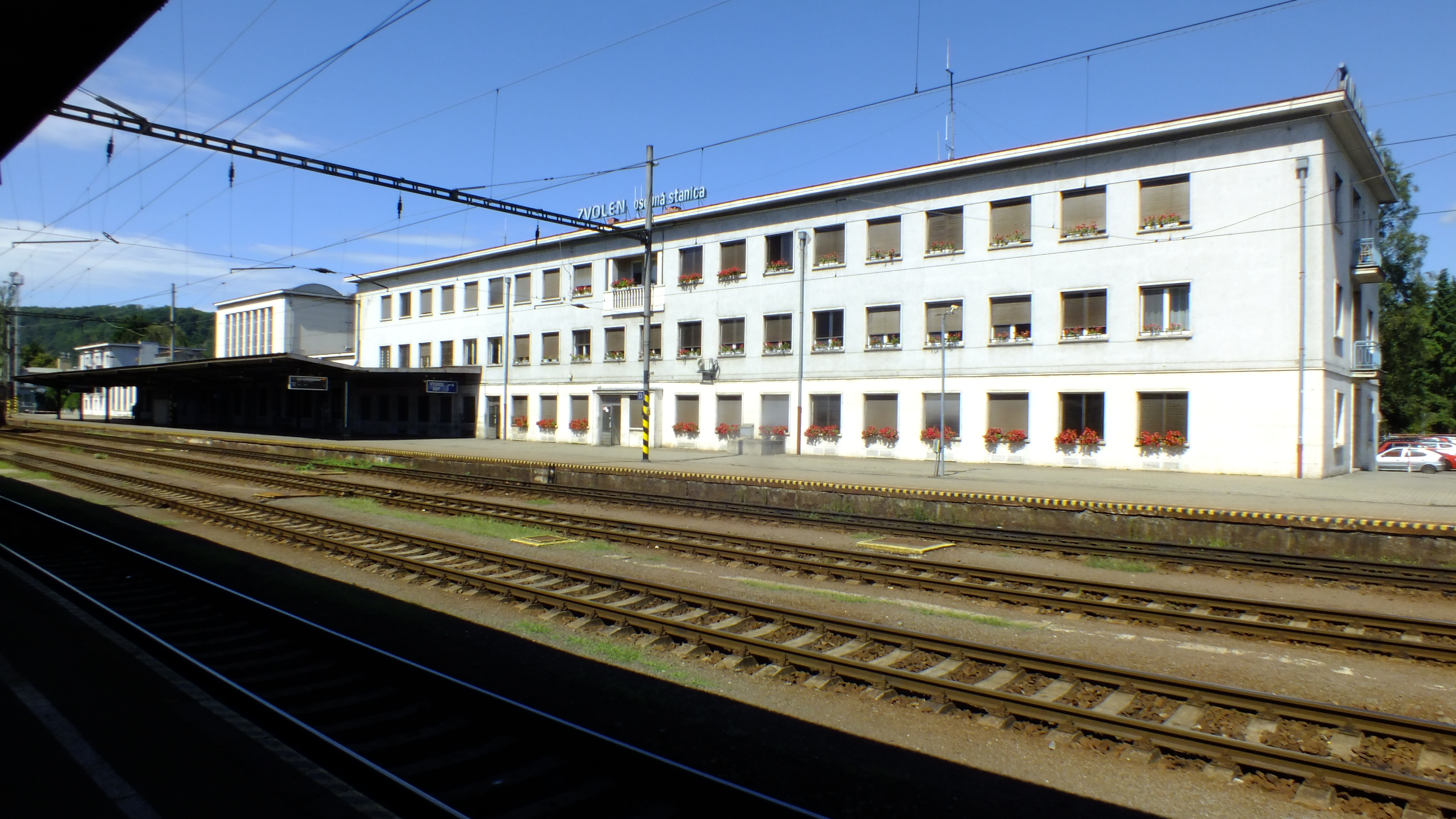
View of the main building from the 2nd platform

The station is owned by Železnice Slovenskej republiky (ŽSR); passenger train services are operated by Železničná spoločnosť Slovensko (ZSSK).

- Ticket sales (national and international)
- Customer Center
- Luggage storage
- Buffet
- Newsstand
- Barrier-free access
- Tactile paving
- Wifi network
- WC
- Cycling station

== Nearby ==
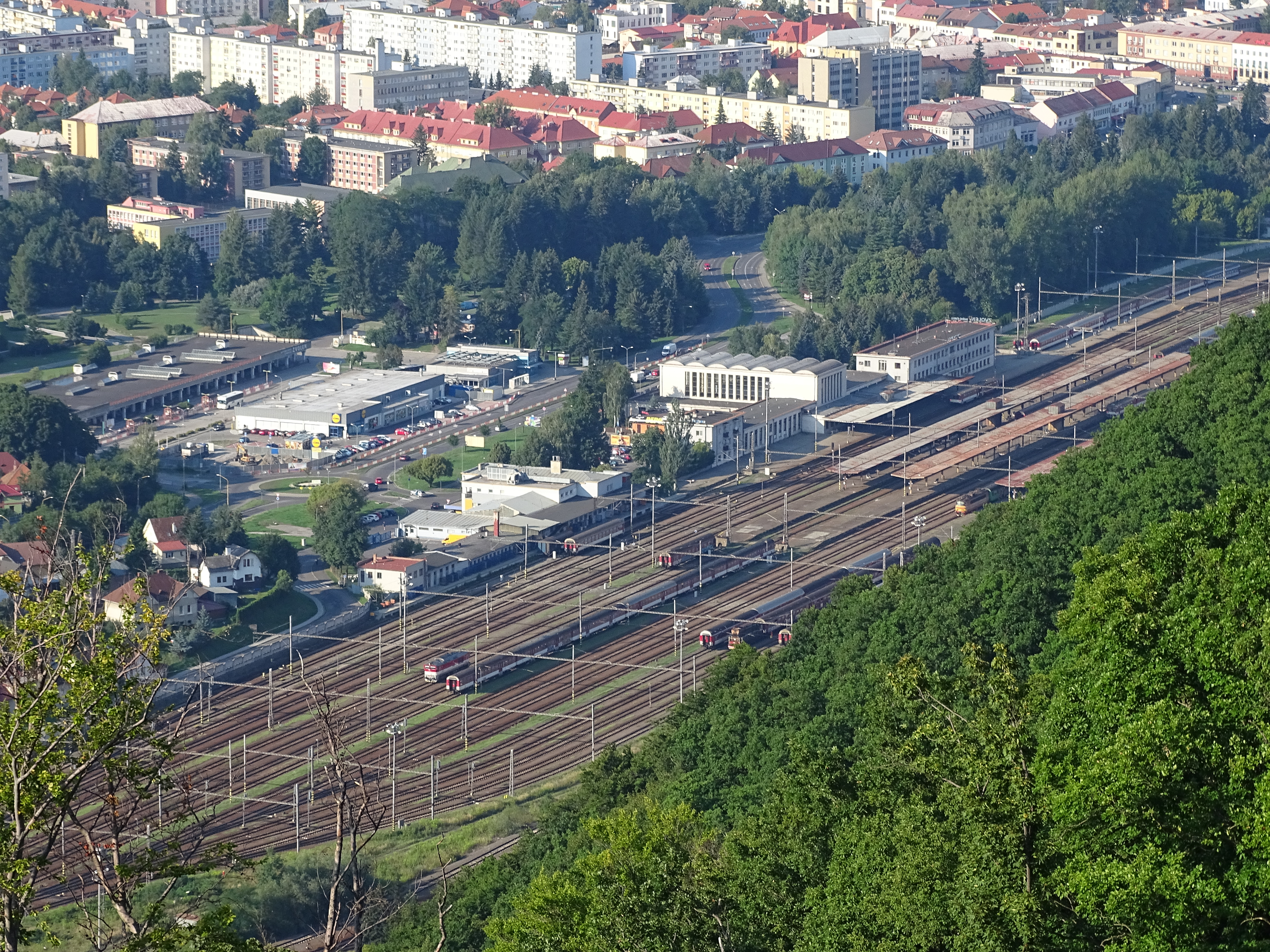
View from Pusty Hrad

=== Transport ===
- Zvolen bus station (national and international transport)
- MHD bus stops (city transport)
- Rail station parking space

== Lines ==
Zvolen osobná railway station is a hub for the following Slovak railway lines:

- Nové Zámky – Zvolen railway (line number 150)
- Zvolen – Čata railway (line number 153)
- Zvolen – Košice railway (line number 160)
- Zvolen – Vrútky railway (line number 170)
- Zvolen – Diviaky railway (line number 171)

Preceding station	ŽSSK	Following station
Terminus	Regional fast trains	Banská Bystrica toward Žilina
Žiar nad Hronom toward Bratislava	Regional fast trains	Zvolen mesto toward Košice via Banská Bystrica
Žiar nad Hronom toward Bratislava	Regional fast trains	Detva toward Košice via Lučenec
Hronská Dúbrava toward Levice	Stopping trains	Zvolen mesto toward Banská Bystrica
Hronská Dúbrava toward Levice	Stopping trains	Zvolen nákladná stanica toward Lučenec

== Gallery ==
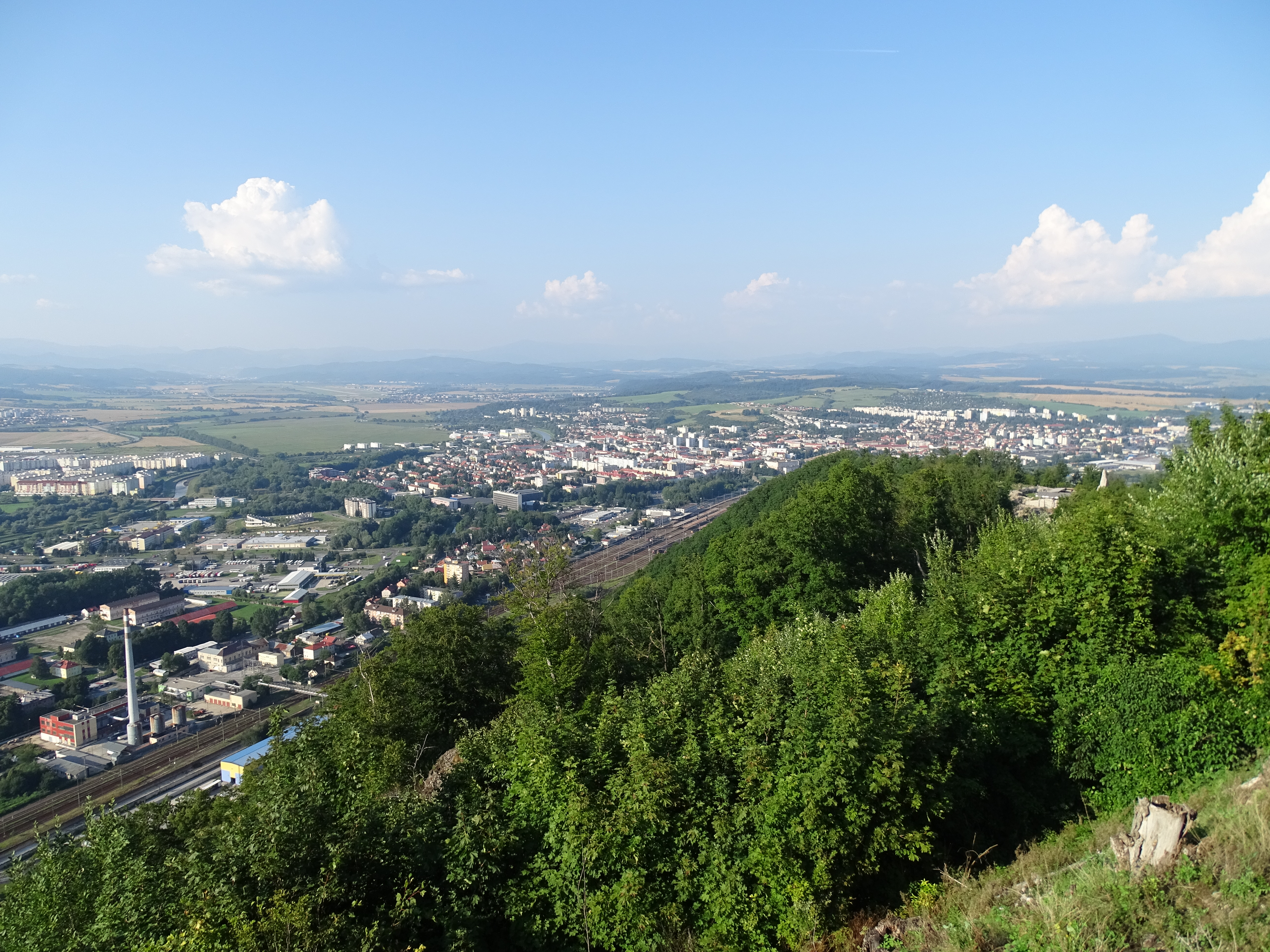
View from Pustý Hrad

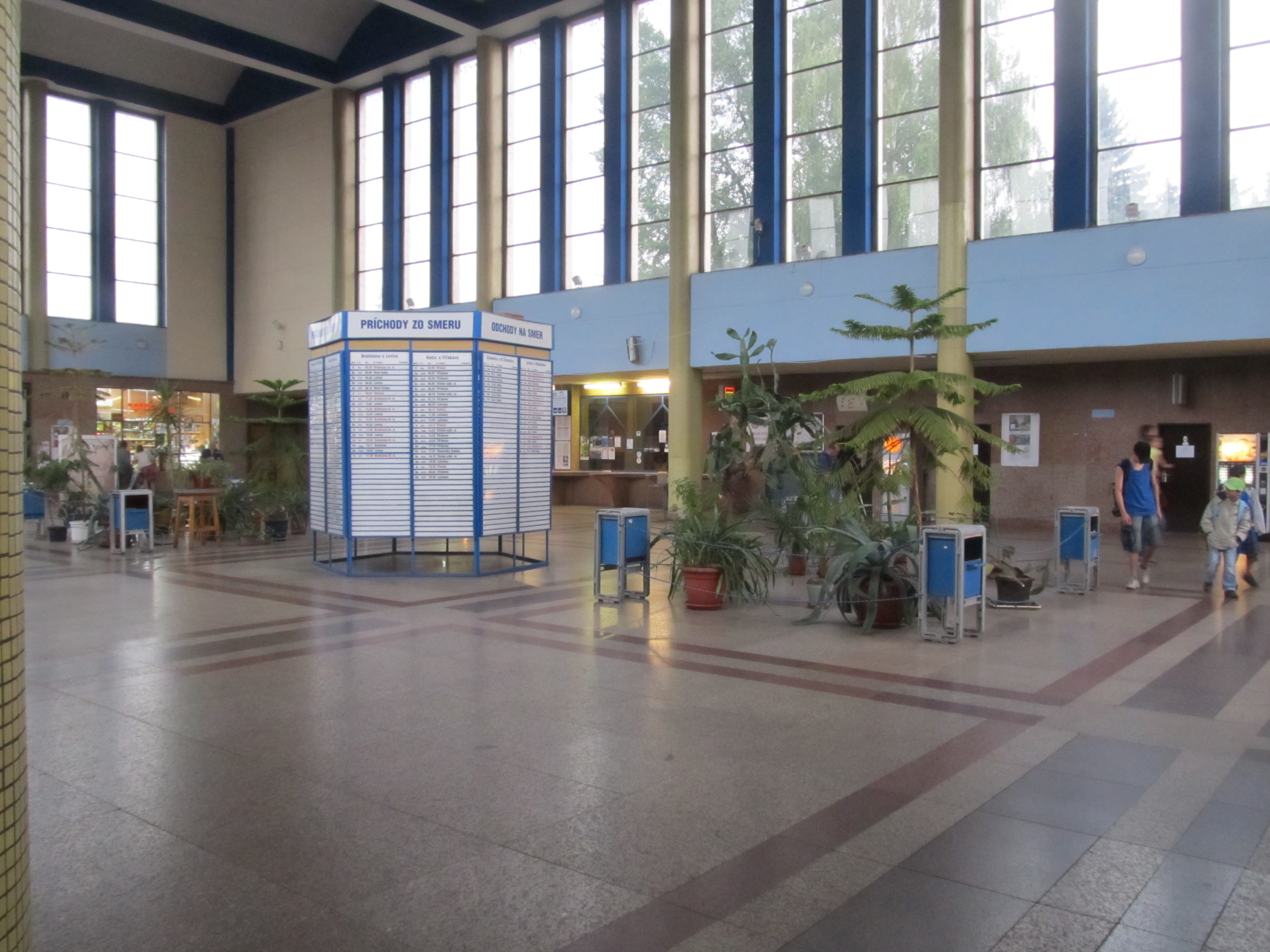
Interior

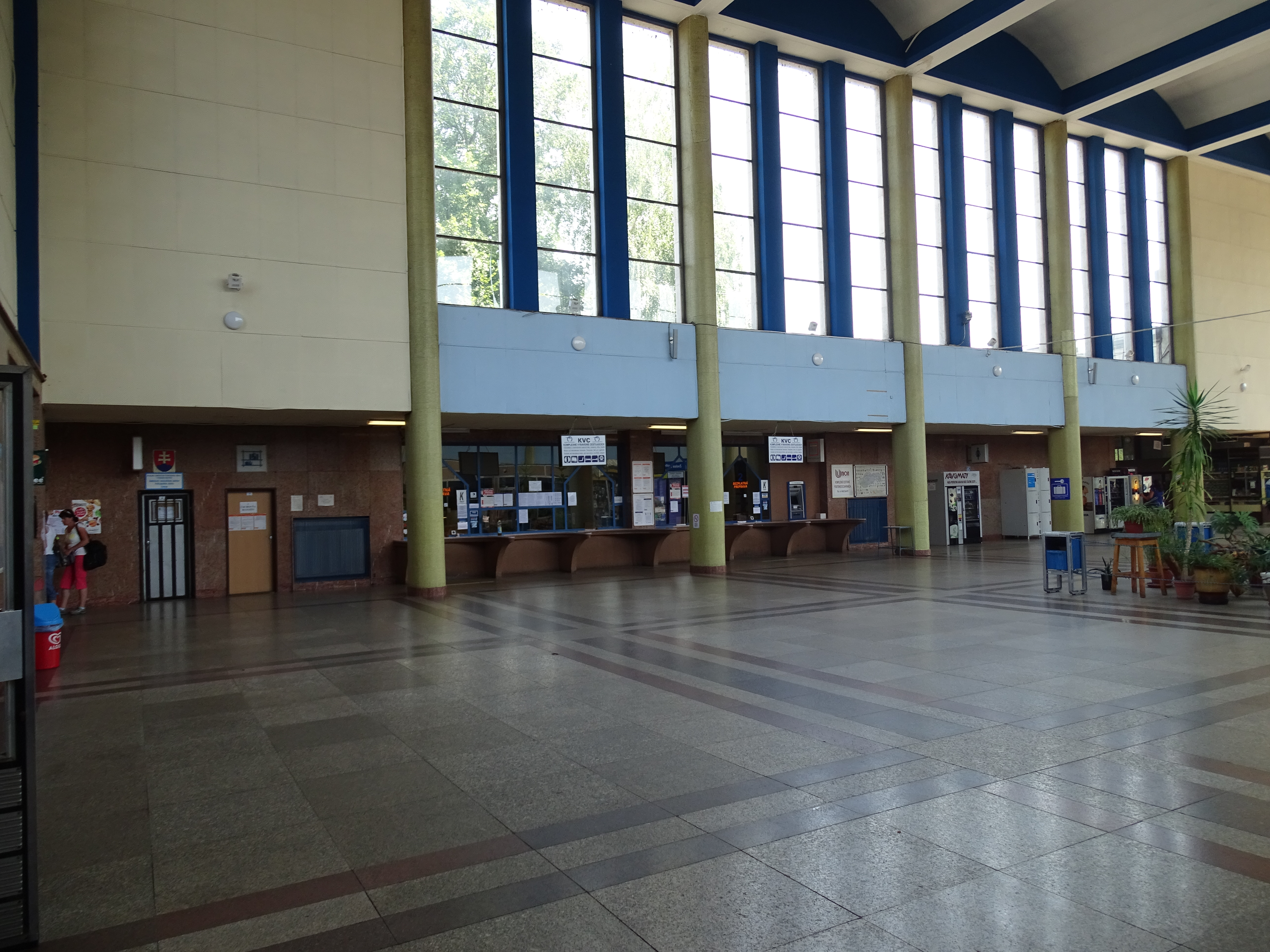
Ticket office

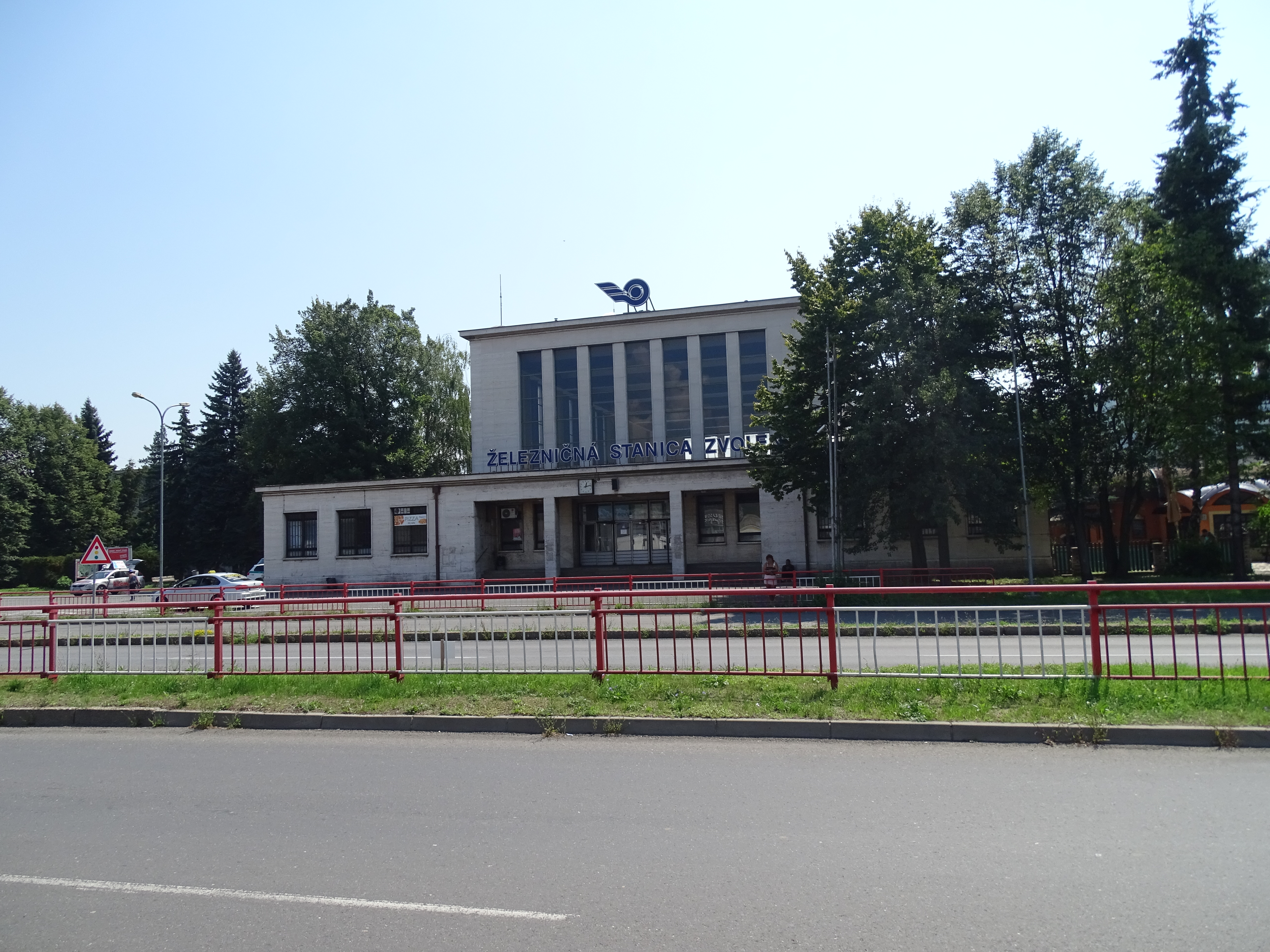
View of the main entrance

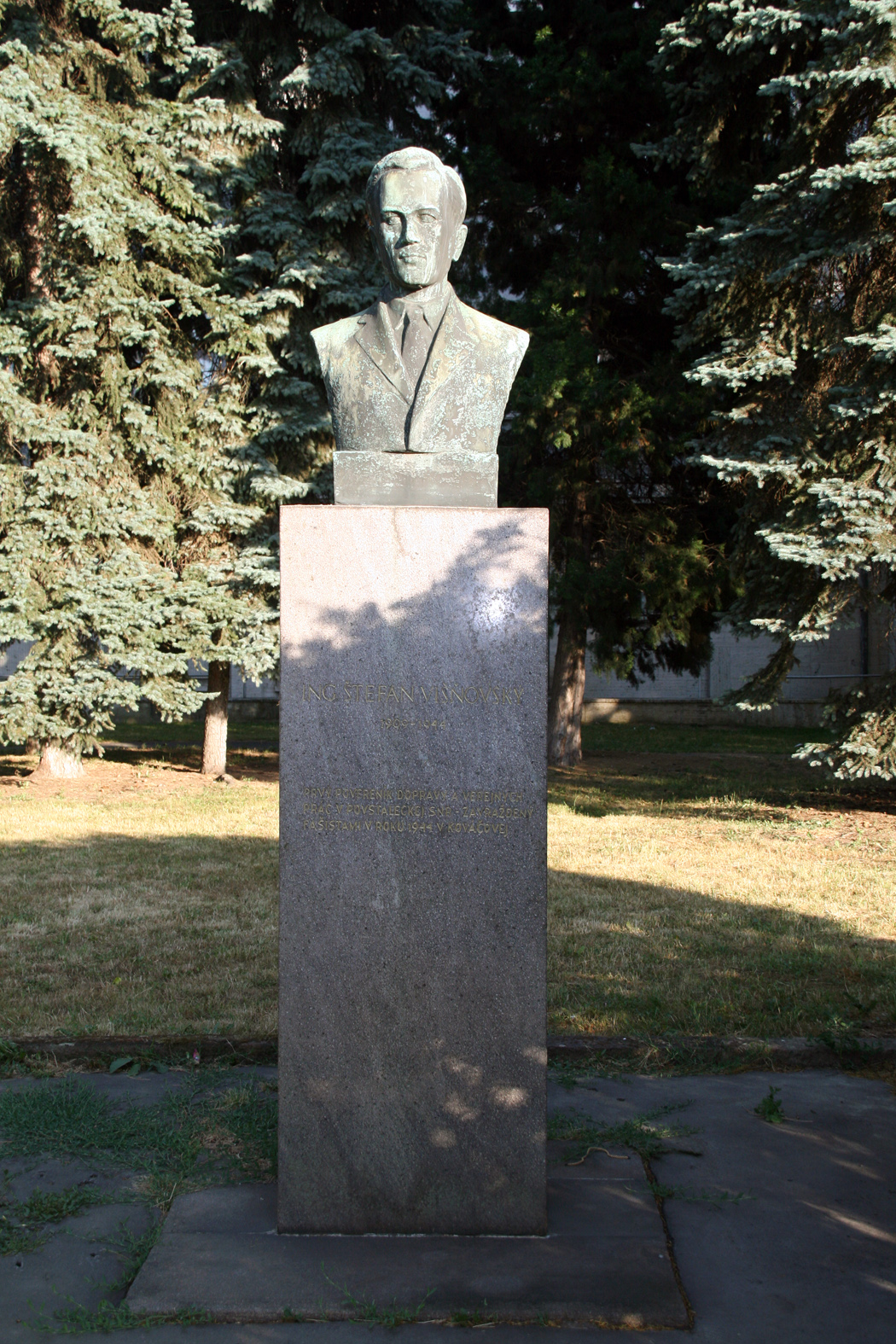
Memorial of Ing. František Višňovský

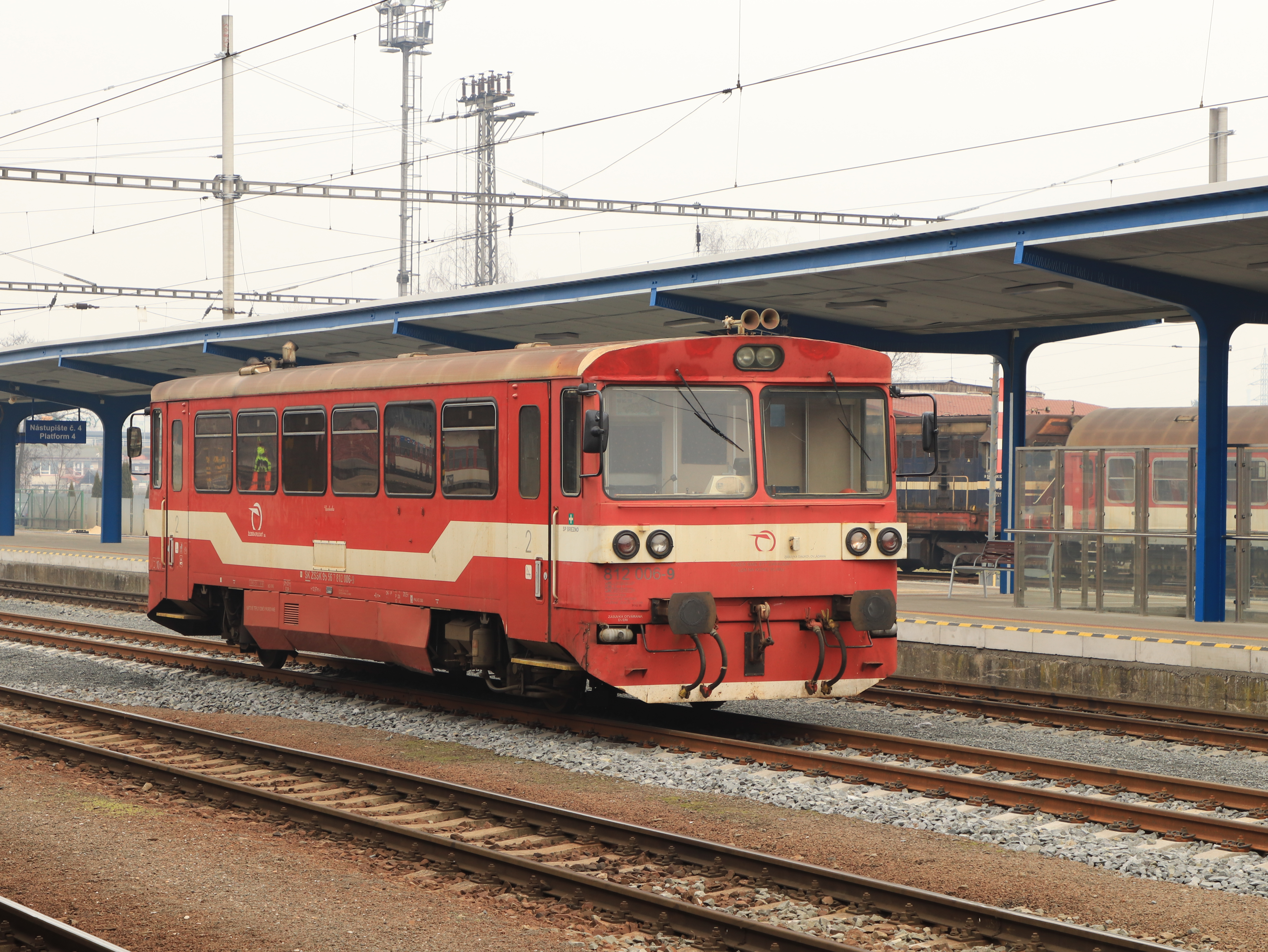
ZSSK 812

== See also ==
- History of rail transport in Slovakia
- Rail transport in Slovakia
