= Elbinger Volksstimme =

Elbinger Volksstimme ('People's Voice of Elbing') was a newspaper published from the West Prussian city of Elbing. Between 1920 and 1922 it was a local organ of the Independent Social Democratic Party of Germany. Gustav Schröder was the editor of the newspaper.
