= Bratislava 3 =

Coordinates: 48.191963°N 17.126513°E

Bratislava III District
- District
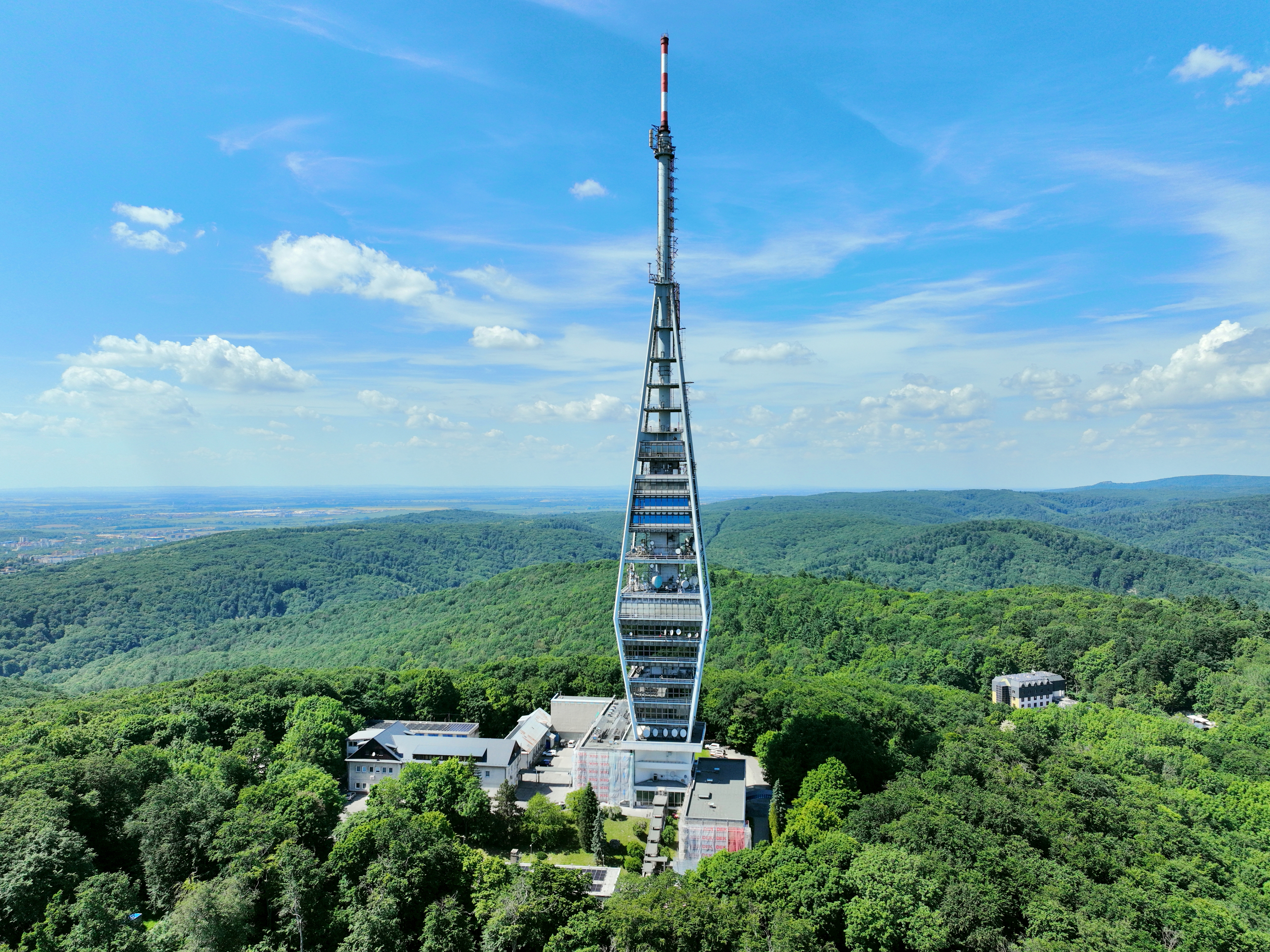
- Country: Slovakia
- Region (kraj): Bratislava Region
- Seat: Bratislava

Area
  - Total: 74.67 km^{2} (28.83 sq mi)

Population (2025)
  - Total: 78,663
- Time zone: UTC+1 (CET)
  - Summer (DST): UTC+2 (CEST)
- Telephone prefix: 02
- Vehicle registration plate (until 2022): BA, BL, BT, BD, BE, BI
- Boroughs: 3

Bratislava III (Slovak: okres Bratislava III; Hungarian: Pozsonyi III. járás) is an okres (district) of Bratislava in the Bratislava Region of Slovakia. The district includes the boroughs of Nové Mesto, Rača and Vajnory. It has an area of 75 km² and 76,720 inhabitants. It is bordered by the Bratislava I, Bratislava II, Bratislava IV, Pezinok and Senec districts.

== Population ==
Historical population
Year	Pop.	±%
1970	75,192	—
1980	72,571	−3.5%
1991	64,485	−11.1%
2001	61,418	−4.8%
2011	61,046	−0.6%
2021	76,270	+24.9%
Source: Censuses

Population statistic (10 years)
Year	1995	2005	2015	2025
Count	64,403	61,728	63,997	78,663
Difference		−4.15%	+3.67%	+22.91%

Population statistic
Year	2024	2025
Count	78,125	78,663
Difference		+0.68%

It has a population of 78,663 people (31 December 2025).

=== Ethnicity ===
Census 2021 (1+ %)
Ethnicity	Number	Fraction
Slovak	64,879	81.63%
Not found out	7860	9.89%
Hungarian	1566	1.97%
Czech	1317	1.65%
Other	823	1.03%
Total	79,474	

In year 2021 was 79,474 people by ethnicity 64,879 as Slovak, 7860 as Not found out, 1566 as Hungarian, 1317 as Czech, 823 as Other, 587 as Vietnamese, 330 as Rusyn, 326 as Ukrainian, 285 as German, 278 as Russian, 120 as Polish, 101 as Chinese, 100 as French, 96 as Italian, 95 as Serbian, 88 as Jewish, 73 as Romanian, 71 as Romani, 71 as Moravian, 70 as Croatian, 66 as Bulgarian, 58 as Austrian, 37 as Greek, 33 as Korean, 32 as English, 32 as Albanian, 28 as Turkish, 27 as Canadian, 10 as Irish, 8 as Silesian and 7 as Iranian.

Note on population: The difference values of population numbers in the table "Population statistic" and in the sections "Ethnicity" & "Religion" is caused by the use of various statistical methods.

=== Religion ===
Census 2021 (1+ %)
Religion	Number	Fraction
None	33,199	43.53%
Roman Catholic Church	27,864	36.53%
Not found out	7813	10.24%
Evangelical Church	3182	4.17%
Greek Catholic Church	841	1.1%
Total	76,270	

In year 2021 was 76,270 people by religion 33,199 from None, 27,864 from Roman Catholic Church, 7813 from Not found out, 3182 from Evangelical Church, 841 from Greek Catholic Church, 466 from Eastern Orthodox Church, 415 from Other, 408 from Ad hoc movements, 294 from Buddhism, 253 from Calvinist Church, 238 from Christian Congregations in Slovakia, 227 from Other and not ascertained christian church, 194 from Jehovah's Witnesses, 166 from Islam, 119 from Apostolic Church, 105 from Church of the Brethren, 99 from Jewish community, 97 from Baptists Church, 80 from Paganism and natural spirituality, 56 from Seventh-day Adventist Church, 44 from United Methodist Church, 37 from Czechoslovak Hussite Church, 24 from Hinduism, 22 from Bahá'i Community, 20 from Old Catholic Church, 6 from Church of Jesus Christ of Latter-day Saints and 1 from New Apostolic Church.

== Boroughs ==
Borough	Area [km^{2}]	Population
Nové Mesto	37.48	45,966
Rača	23.59	26,686
Vajnory	13.53	6,011

Population and area values are current for year 2025.
