= Bratislava hlavná stanica =

Train station in Slovakia

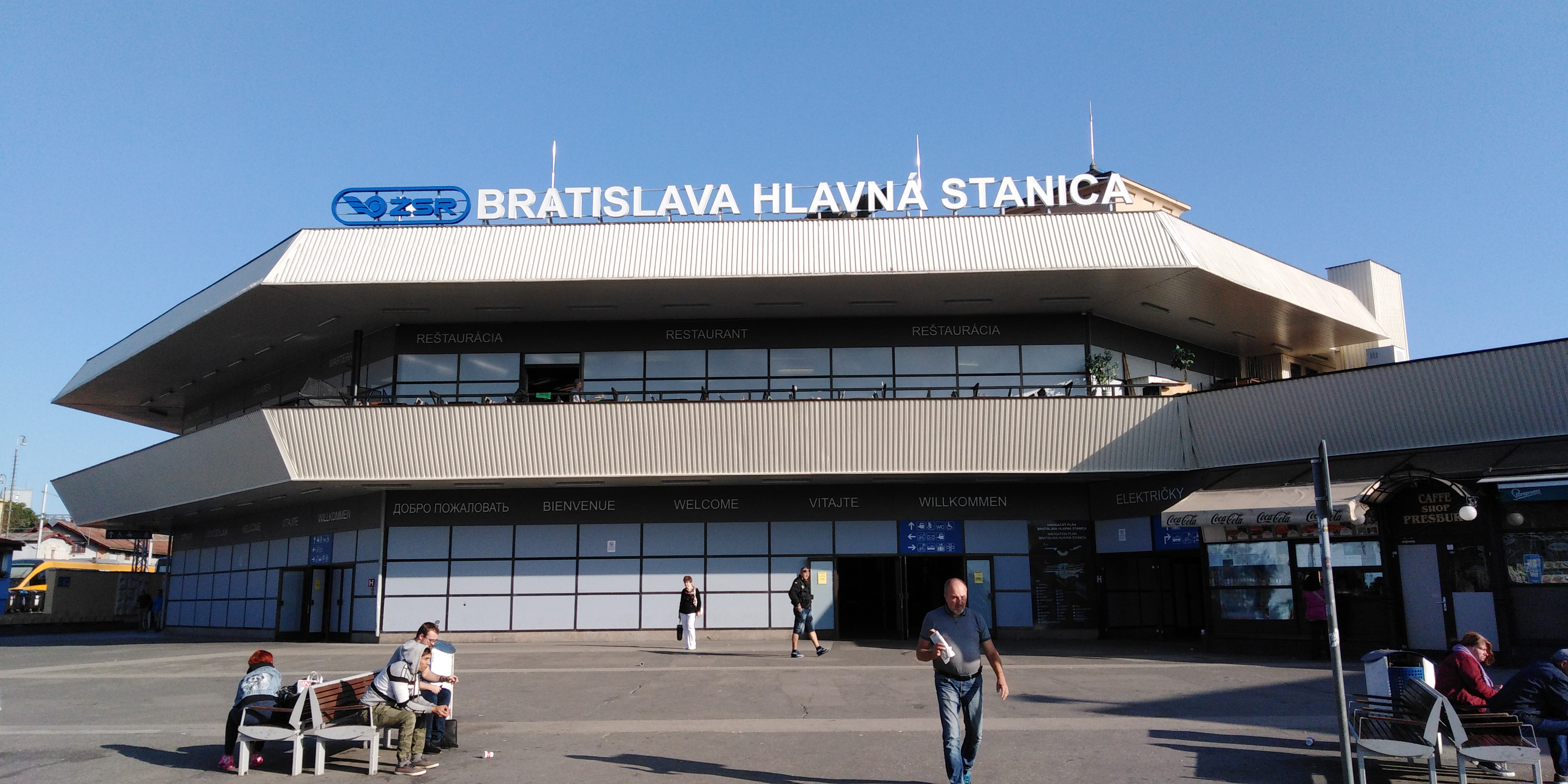
- View of the main entrance to the station

General information
- Location: Námestie Franza Liszta 1 Bratislava I 811 01 Bratislava; Bratislava Region; Slovakia
- Coordinates: 48°09′30″N 17°06′22″E
- Elevation: 130 m (430 ft)
- Owner: Železnice Slovenskej republiky
- Operator: Železnice Slovenskej republiky
- Platforms: 6
- Connections: Trams:, Buses:, Trolleybuses:,,, S trains:,,,

Construction
- Architect: Ignatz Feigler Jr. Ferenc Pfaff

History
- Opened: 20 August 1848
- Rebuilt: 1850, 1988
Location
- Location within Slovakia

The station's main building before the addition of the foyer

Bratislava hlavná stanica (abbreviated as Bratislava hl.st.; German: Pressburg Hauptbahnhof; Hungarian: Pozsony főpályaudvar) is the main railway station of the city of Bratislava, Slovakia. It averages about 60,000 passengers per day.

Apart from domestic routes, international routes from this station include trains to Austria, Croatia (summer only), the Czech Republic, Germany, Hungary, Poland, Serbia, and Switzerland.

== Etymology ==
Prior to 1919 the city was part of Austria-Hungary, and was known as "Pressburg", in German, and "Pozsony", in Hungarian. The station was named Pressburg Hauptbahnhof and Pozsony főpályaudvar in those languages.

== History ==
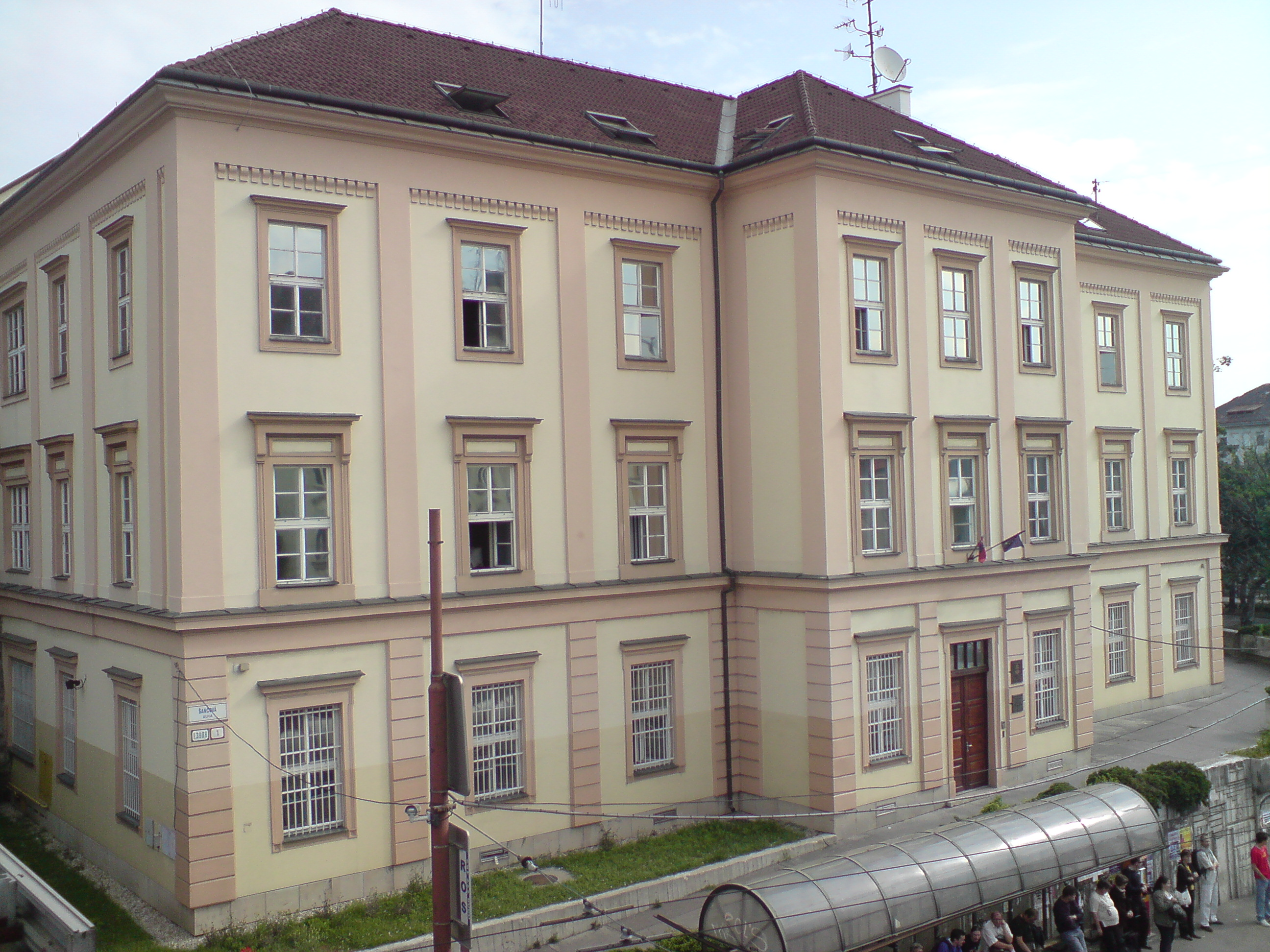
The original station building from 1848

The first station building, a two-storey building at Šancová 1, now serves as the headquarters of the railway police. It was built in 1848 as the terminus for the Vienna – Gänserndorf – Bratislava (Pressburg) and Břeclav – Bratislava (Pressburg) lines. The second building, which is used to this day, was built after the completion of the Budapest – Párkány (Štúrovo) – Bratislava line in 1905 to the design of Ferenc Pfaff, who was the Hungarian State Railways's main architect at the time. Originally it was built in eclectic style, however in 1960 it underwent a major reconstruction, when the exterior was completely changed to be more "socialist" in nature. The frescos were added to the interior at the same time. The foyer, colloquially called "Skleník" (meaning "greenhouse"), was added to the second building in 1987 as an extension, which was meant only as a temporary solution already during its construction. This extension was scheduled to be demolished during the reconstruction of the Franz Liszt Square, which, though, has never been started by the investor, what led into a lawsuit by the city and the state-owned railway company. That caused a stall to any changes for many years. Newest plans by the railway company are just to renew the foyer and surrounding area, until a new station will be built.

In 1883, a connection was added to the Bratislava-Rača station, which was connected to the line to Žilina. The line to the Nové Mesto station is the most recently added line, and it was built in 1962

At first, the station also had freight loading and unloading facilities. One unique feature was the "vínovod" ("wine transport system"), which consisted of tubing from the station to the Palugyay family's wine cellars. Gravity flow drew wine from trains into barrels in the cellars. The station also had a ropeway conveyor to Patrónka (cartridge factory) which produced ammunition cartridges, colloquially known as "patróny". As passenger traffic increased, freight operations were progressively relocated to other stations in the city.

The station's engine house by the stabling yard was built after the removal of the old stabling yard, which was formerly in the space occupied by platforms 3-5.

On January 1, 1919, as Czechoslovak troops were about to enter the city, negotiations between representatives of the Pressburg population, led by Paul Wittich, and Entente officers, led by the Italian Colonel Barreca, took place at the Pressburg railway station.

== Current situation ==
Current rail traffic exceeds the station's track capacity, which occasionally becomes evident in a domino effect caused by delayed trains. One suggested solution is to transfer some of the trains to the Nové Mesto and Petržalka stations, which currently have unused track capacity.

=== Future reconstruction ===
Since 2000, there have been plans to reconstruct not only the station but also the surrounding area, most importantly the Franz Liszt Square. The investor is the company I.P.R. Slovakia and the cost was estimated at €232,357,432 in 2008. In 2003, the Bratislava City Magistrate agreed with the project. In 2006, the Old Town district of Bratislava and the Regional Environment Office decided to allow I.P.R. Slovakia to cut down 630 trees worth €230,000 and shrubs worth of €14,000. The decision is final and according to experts, when executed it will forever change the micro-climate of the area. Since 1 September 2007 a new City plan came into effect in Bratislava and in 2008 the Old Town district informed the investor that he needs another agreement from the Bratislava City Magistrate.

== Access ==
Bratislava main station serves as the hub for the local public transport service (MHD). It can thus be conveniently accessed from all parts of Bratislava. Many buses and trolleybuses terminate here as well as almost all of the night buses for which station serves as the hub.

Tram routes number 1 and 7 commence at the station and serve both the old town and the new town. In 2012 the government allocated part of a €420m transport funding package towards the construction of a segregated light rail line from the main station to the Šafárik Square and Janíkov Dvor, and modernisation of the existing tram route to Dúbravka.

== Military shelter ==
Bratislava main station features one of the city's major war shelters built during the communist era, to protect citizens from air raids or attacks with weapons of mass destruction. As with many other similar structures in Bratislava, it is inaccessible and not widely known to the public. Built in the 1950s, it is located underneath the Jaskový rad Street and nearby houses and its designed capacity is 1,500 people. The main entrance can be found at the very end of the tunnel leading to platforms, after leaving the tunnel, the entrance is behind a small metal door built into the massive rock wall.
The shelter features several hallways, rooms, a command centre, air filtering and power generating machinery and toilets. There are two emergency exits, one behind Hotel Spirit and the other behind the building known as U Matúša, which in the past featured a pub with the same name, both on private property. The shelter belongs to the Railways of Slovak Republic.

== Services ==
Preceding station	Železničná spoločnosť Slovensko	Following station
Kúty toward Berlin	EuroNight; EN Metropol	Nové Zámky toward Budapest
Kúty toward Prague or Ostrava	EuroCity	Nové Zámky toward Budapest occasional terminus
Terminus	InterCity	Trnava toward Košice
Terminus	Regional fast trains	Bratislava-Vinohrady toward Zvolen or Štúrovo
Terminus	Regional fast trains	Bratislava-Vinohrady toward Košice or Žilina
Terminus	Regional Express	Bratislava-Vinohrady toward Trenčín or Trnava
Terminus	Regional Express	Bratislava-Vinohrady toward Prievidza
Devínska Nová Ves toward Kúty or Břeclav	Regional Express	Terminus
Terminus	Regional Express	Bratislava-Vinohrady toward Nové Zámky
Bratislava-Lamač toward Vienna	Regional Express	Terminus
Bratislava-Železná studienka toward Kúty or Malacky	Stopping trains	Terminus
Terminus	Stopping trains	Bratislava-Vinohrady toward Nové Zámky
Terminus	Stopping trains	Bratislava-Vinohrady toward Leopoldov
Preceding station	Leo Express	Following station
Terminus	Regional Express	Bratislava-Nové Mesto toward Komárno

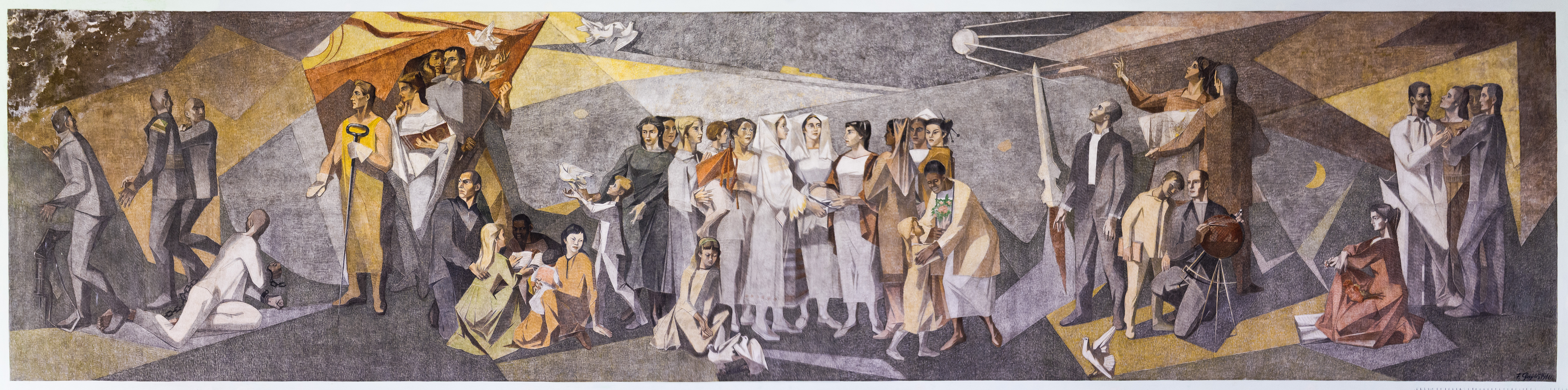
A composite view of the large Socialist Realist fresco by František Gajdoš

== See also ==
- Transport in Bratislava
- Bratislava-Petržalka railway station
