= Rača, Bratislava =

Rača
- Borough
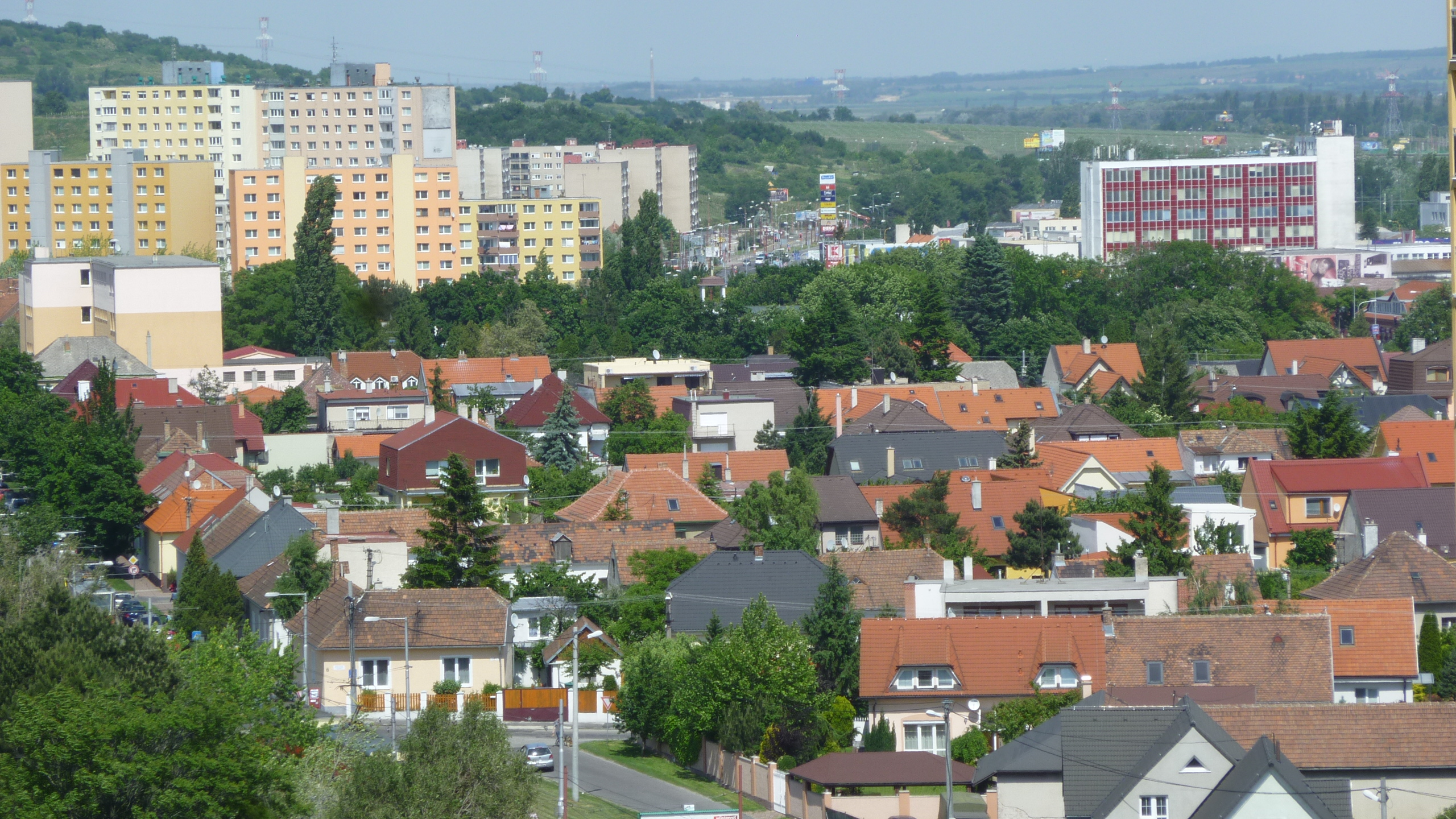
- View over Rača

- Coat of arms

- Area of Rača in Bratislava

- Location of Rača in Slovakia
- Coordinates: 48°08′00″N 17°07′00″E
- Country: Slovakia
- Region: Bratislava Region
- District: Bratislava III
- First mentioned: 1226 (Julian)

Government
  - Mayor: Michal Drotován

Area
  - Total: 23.59 km^{2} (9.11 sq mi)
- Elevation: 148 m (486 ft)

Population (2025)
  - Total: 26,686
- Time zone: UTC+1 (CET)
  - Summer (DST): UTC+2 (CEST)
- Postal code: 831 06
- Area code: +421-2
- Vehicle registration plate (until 2022): BA, BL, BT
- Website: www.raca.sk

Rača is a borough of Bratislava, Slovakia, in the Bratislava III district.

== Names and etymology ==
The name probably comes from the Slavic personal name Radša/Radoslav or the Slavic stem vorč-/vrača (a fence). (Note: Although historic records mention a person Racha/Rechee, the personal name could be derived from the name of the village and not otherwise.) The name was adopted by Germans as Rechesdorf (literally Rača's village, 1390). The Germanized form had been used even by the Slovaks themselves, e.g., Račissdorf (1914), Račištorf (1920-1946) except for a short period in 1920 when the official name was Raslavice. In 1946, its original name Rača was restored.

== History ==
Rača was mentioned for the first time in 1296 as a vineyard village under the name villa Racha. In 1946, the village became a borough of Bratislava.

== Geography ==
The municipality lies at an altitude of 148 metres (486 ft) and covers an area of 23.59 km^{2} (9.11 sq mi) (2025).

== Population ==
Population statistic (10 years)
Year	1995	2005	2015	2025
Count	21,079	20,357	20,791	26,686
Difference		−3.42%	+2.13%	+28.35%

Population statistic
Year	2024	2025
Count	26,493	26,686
Difference		+0.72%

It has a population of 26,686 people (31 December 2025).

=== Ethnicity ===
Census 2021 (1+ %)
Ethnicity	Number	Fraction
Slovak	22,098	85.87%
Not found out	2618	10.17%
Hungarian	482	1.87%
Czech	430	1.67%
Total	25,733	

In year 2021 was 25,733 people by ethnicity 22,098 as Slovak, 2618 as Not found out, 482 as Hungarian, 430 as Czech, 200 as Other, 177 as Vietnamese, 123 as Rusyn, 121 as Ukrainian, 92 as Russian, 73 as German, 34 as Romani, 27 as Moravian, 26 as Serbian, 26 as Polish, 23 as Jewish, 20 as Bulgarian, 19 as Italian, 15 as Chinese, 12 as Romanian, 12 as Austrian, 12 as French, 9 as Greek, 8 as Canadian, 8 as English, 7 as Croatian, 4 as Turkish, 2 as Silesian, 2 as Albanian and 1 as Iranian.

Note on population: The difference values of population numbers in the table "Population statistic" and in the sections "Ethnicity" & "Religion" is caused by the use of various statistical methods.

=== Religion ===
Census 2021 (1+ %)
Religion	Number	Fraction
None	11,017	42.81%
Roman Catholic Church	9582	37.24%
Not found out	2635	10.24%
Evangelical Church	1022	3.97%
Greek Catholic Church	305	1.19%
Total	25,733	

In year 2021 was 25,733 people by religion 11,017 from None, 9582 from Roman Catholic Church, 2635 from Not found out, 1022 from Evangelical Church, 305 from Greek Catholic Church, 171 from Eastern Orthodox Church, 135 from Ad hoc movements, 130 from Other, 123 from Jehovah's Witnesses, 110 from Christian Congregations in Slovakia, 87 from Other and not ascertained christian church, 77 from Buddhism, 73 from Calvinist Church, 43 from Apostolic Church, 40 from Baptists Church, 37 from Paganism and natural spirituality, 32 from Church of the Brethren, 31 from Islam, 27 from Jewish community, 14 from United Methodist Church, 11 from Seventh-day Adventist Church, 10 from Czechoslovak Hussite Church, 8 from Hinduism, 7 from Old Catholic Church, 3 from Church of Jesus Christ of Latter-day Saints and 3 from Bahá'i Community.
