= Battle of Čierny Balog =

Battle during WWII in Slovakia

- Part of World War II
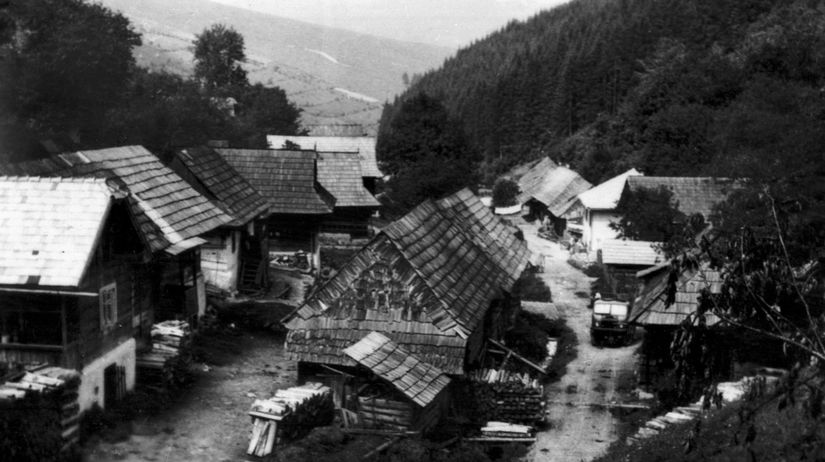
- Čierny Balog c.1944
Date	28– 29 January 1945
Location	Čierny Balog, Banská Bystrica Region, Slovakia 48.747222°N 19.656111°E
Result	Local militia and partisans prevented the retreating German forces from entering the village. At a critical moment, Red Army soldiers entered the village. The Germans were subsequently forced to retreat from Horehronie to Brezno.

Belligerents
(Nazi Germany) 309th Rifle Regiment (Nazi Germany) 208th Division	(Czechoslovakia) Local militia (Czechoslovakia) (Soviet Union) Nikolai Radula's detachment of the Khrushchev partisan brigade (Soviet Union) 136th Guards Regiment, 42nd Guards Division

Commanders and leaders
—	Capt. Ján Benko; Lt. Anton Kupec

Units involved
700 men retreating from Klenovac; 120 men advancing from Hronec	Approx. 60 militiamen and partisans hundreds of civilian helpers

Casualties and losses
- Dozens for both sides
- Location within Slovakia

The Battle of Čierny Balog and its liberation took place on 28–29 January 1945 in the village of Čierny Balog. In 1944, the inhabitants of the village participated in the Slovak National Uprising in large numbers and the village was the target of Nazi reprisals in October–November. Units of the 1st Czechoslovak Partisan Brigade of Joseph Stalin, the Khrushchev Partisan League and units of the 2nd Czechoslovak Paratrooper Brigade operated in the vicinity of the village. On the afternoon of 28 January, about 700 German soldiers of the 309th Rifle Regiment of the 208th Division retreated towards the village after being defeated in Klenovec. The municipal militia and partisans were alerted by the mountaineer Ján Daniš, who reported about 100 Germans. Despite the fact that the Germans were superior, the local militia and partisans resisted and managed to repel the Germans near the settlement of Dobroč on January 28. This encouraged the entire village, whose citizens participated en masse either in the defense or in clearing the road through the Šaling valley, where the Red Army was expected to advance. By appropriate maneuvering, the defenders under the command of the native Lt. Anton Kupec - Múranica managed to repel several German attacks, including an attack through the Hronec valley, where another German company was attacking the Balok settlement of Krám. On January 29, 1945, around 11 a.m., the first units of the Red Army entered Čierny Balog and by the evening the entire village was liberated.

== Build-up ==
The residents of Čierny Balog participated in the Slovak National Uprising by joining the rebel army and partisan units.

=== Nazi repression ===
The German army first entered the village on October 26, 1944. On that day, local residents, a train driver and his assistant, were driving a partisan commander and one partisan from Klenovec on a narrow-gauge train to Hroncec, where they encountered an advancing German unit of the 18th SS Horst Wessel Division in the Hrončianska Valley. The partisan commander managed to escape during the shooting, the other three were captured by the Germans and placed against the wall in Hronec and shot as a warning. German execution of captured rebel soldiers on Sihla On November 7-16, 1944, the SS Schill group occupied the Brezno - Hriňová road, thus closing the encirclement ring around Poľana, where the last organized battle of the rebel forces was taking place. 25 rebel soldiers were captured and subsequently murdered in the Sedmák area, in the Sihla municipality. 312 In total, around 80 rebel soldiers and partisans were shot while attempting to cross this road. On 11 November 1944, in the Čierny Balog municipality, the Germans shot the captured partisan Ema Klimentová. On 14 November 1944, the Germans discovered a group of gypsies from Neresnica hiding in the Vydrovo Valley. They divided the families into men and women with children. Both groups, totalling about 60 people, were herded into two wooden huts and burned alive.

=== Partisan activities ===
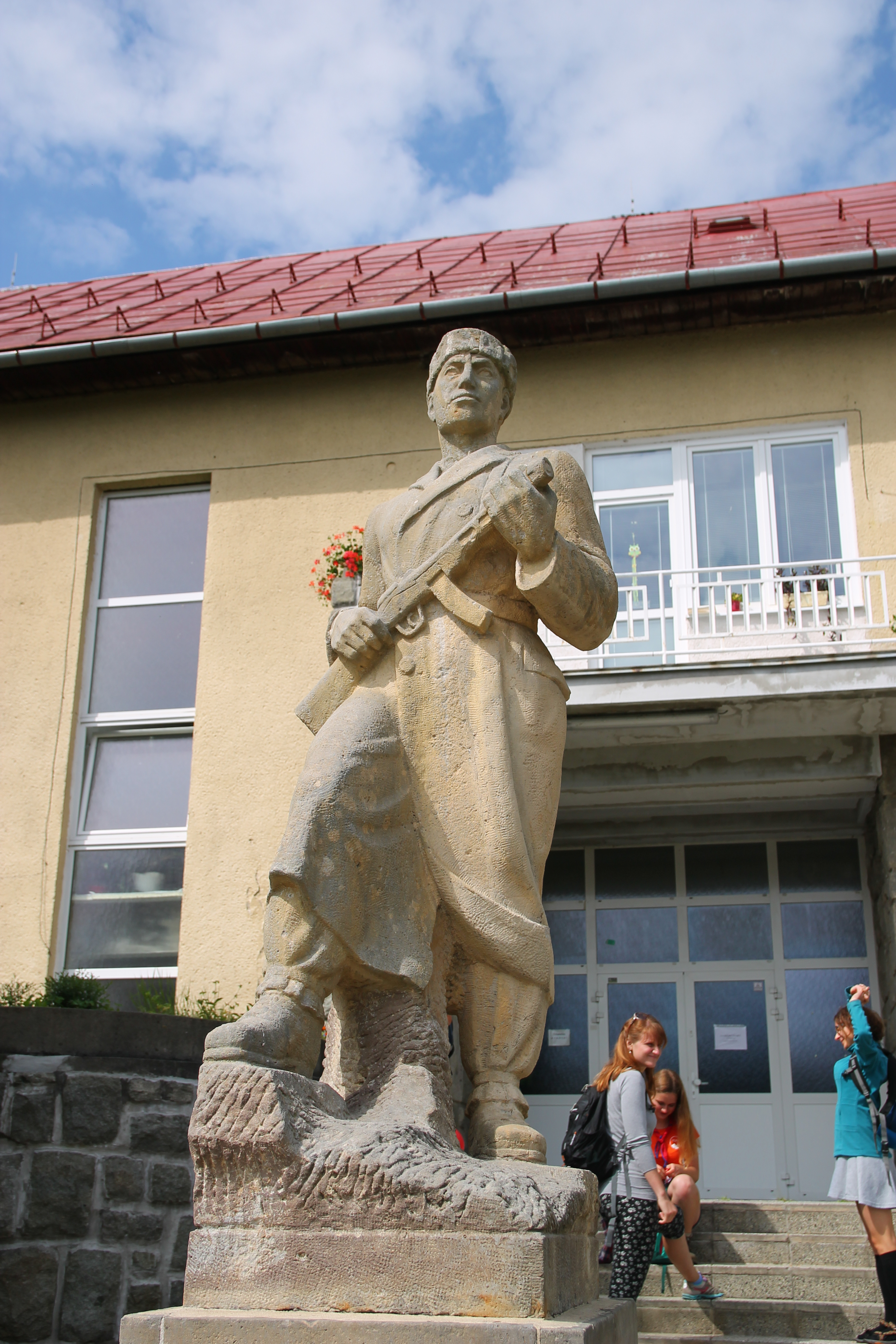
Monument to the Partisans

After the uprising was suppressed, units of the 1st Czechoslovak Partisan Brigade of J. V. Stalin, the Khrushchev Partisan League and units of the 2nd Czechoslovak Paratrooper Brigade operated in the vicinity of the village. Communist functionaries Karol Bacílek and Marek Čulen were hiding in a bunker in Stará dolina below Klenovským Vepr. The Germans withdrew from the village and sent patrols there, and several clashes with the partisans occurred: in January 1945, the partisans captured and killed 3 German soldiers in the settlement of Jánošovka. On January 16, 1945, members of the 1st Czechoslovak Partisan Brigade Stalin's partisan brigade under the command of Nikolai Łaška in Čierny Balog captured 13 Hungarian soldiers from the 62nd Border Regiment of the 1st Hungarian Army, 5 of whom were shot. On January 21, members of the Khrushchev partisan unit in Čierny Balog in the settlement of Krám captured 7 German soldiers, who were killed after being interrogated at the headquarters. On the same or the following day, partisans from the Khrushchev unit in Čierny Balog captured and shot two more groups of German soldiers.

== The battle ==
In the last days of January, the Red Army approached the village from the southeast. On January 28, the German defense at Klenovec was broken and the Germans began to retreat in two directions. The first stream headed under the northern side of the Klenovský Vepr through Grúň to Bánov. This group was pursued by the Red Army and Romanian units, who drove the Germans to the Diel saddle and from there through Pohronská Polhora towards Brezno.

The second wave consisted of approximately 700 soldiers of the German 309th Infantry Regiment of the 208th Division, who moved underneath the southern slopes of Klenovský Vepor across the mountain saddle between Machnáčový Grúň (1096 m) and Šopisko (1083 m) into the territory of Čierny Balog. They trudged along a difficult mountain road through 1.5-meter deep snow towards Mount Iľková (778 m), from where they probably descended into the Za Pálenicami valley and eventually into the Páleničná valley. Along the way, there were forester’s huts in front of Sviniarka, in front of Molčanová Dolina, and below Chmeľús, where the Germans counted on resting during their strenuous move through the snowy mountains.

The Germans' arrival was reported to Čierny Balog by forester Ján Daniš from the hut in front of Molčanová, 4.5 km from the settlement of Dobroč, on the afternoon of January 28. Initially, he reported 50—100 Germans, later increasing the number but had to interrupt communication.

The Balocká militia, mostly former insurgent soldiers, began preparing with about 40 men to resist approximately 500 meters from the last house of the Dobroč settlement, at the start of the Páleničná valley, on a hill "under Krátky Bán" with a slope covered in dense spruce forest, with a good view and range of the meadow below. Reinforcing the defenders was a partisan unit led by Nikolaj Radula from Stará Dolina, along with several partisans from the Chruščov group and members of the Czechoslovak Partisan Brigade from the Medveďovo settlement, bringing the total number of defenders to about 55—60 people. The defense was organized by staff captain Dr. Ján Benko of the 2nd Czechoslovak Parachute Brigade, who was proposed for this role by communist officials Karol Bacílek and Marek Čulen.

On Sunday, January 28, around 3 p.m., the first groups of Germans, in significantly larger numbers than reported by Daniš, approached the large open meadow. Captain (military and police rank) Benko assessed the situation as "hopeless" and wanted to retreat so that the Germans, after a lost battle, would not "take revenge on the inhabitants". Then Lieutenant Anton Kupec-Múranica, a native of Medveďov and veteran of the 2nd Czechoslovak Parachute Brigade, opposed him, arguing that by retreating, the Germans would gain advantageous positions upon entering Dobroč and could set the entire village on fire.

Kupec-Múranica mainly rallied the local defenders to his side. When the Germans approached in formation to within 100—150 meters, they were unexpectedly caught in a hail of machine gun, submachine gun, and rifle fire. The sudden attack disoriented them, causing panic among their ranks. In this first encounter, about 60 were left dead on the meadow.

The Germans encountered resistance at the Vydrovo settlement and therefore continued across Urbanov vrch towards the settlements of Dolina and Medveďov, but they were also repelled here, losing 11 men. They continued to retreat through deep snow, unfamiliar mountain terrain along the southern edge of the village, along the Čierny Hron river.

At 8 a.m., a relay reported that a platoon of about 120 Germans from Hronec had arrived at the Krám settlement. They occupied the settlement and set fire to the forest management building. Anton Kupec moved another machine gun from the Vydrovo valley and a group of partisans to occupy the high embankment of the state road and block the route from Krám to Čierny Balog.

Around 11 a.m. on January 29, Soviet patrols appeared, and the Red Army entered the village. By evening, the defenders, together with the Red Army, had also liberated the Krám settlement. The Germans in Krám lost 30 men; the rest retreated to the village of Hronec.

Due to the resistance of the local defenders, partisans, and the rapid advance of the units of the Red Army, Čierny Balog was liberated on the evening of 29 January 1945. The defenders had strategically chosen positions, the Germans were exhausted from retreating, and their weapons failed them in the cold. Only volunteers from the militia, insurgent soldiers, and partisans were fighting against them, and they mistakenly believed that the Red Army had already overtaken them on the way to Čierny Balog.

== Aftermath ==
The rapid liberation of Čierny Balog significantly helped the liberation of the upper part of Horehronie. The road to the town of Brezno from the south was opened. To avoid encirclement, the German army had to quickly leave the Hron valley from Červená Skala (Šumiac) and Tisovec to Brezno and on January 30, 1945, eleven Horehronie villages were liberated. On January 31, at 4 o'clock in the morning, the Red and Romanian armies launched an attack on Brezno from Čierny Balog and Pohronská Polhora, and in the afternoon the town was liberated. In 1947, the village was awarded the honorary title "Rebel Village". Čierny Balog was awarded the Order of the Slovak National Uprising, 1st class, the Dukel Memorial Medal and the Order of the Red Star (1964). In 2020, the Minister of Defense of the Slovak Republic, Peter Gajdoš, awarded the village with the "Commemorative Medal for the 75th Anniversary of the Slovak National Uprising and the End of the Second World War" as a village burned down during World War II.
