= List of football stadiums in Slovakia =

The following is a list of football stadiums in Slovakia, ranked in order of capacity, with the minimum capacity being 1,000. The largest football stadium by capacity in Slovakia is the 22,500-capacity Tehelne Pole in Bratislava. Stadiums in bold are part of the 2025–26 Slovak First Football League.

== Current stadiums ==
#	Image	Stadium	Capacity	City	Home team(s)	UEFA rank
1		**Tehelné pole**	22,500	Bratislava	ŠK Slovan Bratislava	4/4 stars
2		**Anton Malatinský Stadium**	18,200	Trnava	FC Spartak Trnava	4/4 stars
3		**MOL Aréna**	12,700	Dunajská Streda	FC DAC 1904 Dunajská Streda	4/4 stars
4		**Košická futbalová aréna**	12,555	Košice	FC Košice	4/4 stars
5		Štadión Pasienky	11,591	Bratislava	ŠK Slovan B	2/4 stars
6		**Štadión pod Dubňom**	10,897	Žilina	MŠK Žilina	4/4 stars
7		Lokomotíva Stadium	9,200	Košice	FC Lokomotíva Košice	2/4 stars
8		Štadión pod Zoborom	7,480	Nitra	FC Nitra	3/4 stars
9		**Národný Atletický Štadión**	7,381	Banská Bystrica	FK Dukla Banská Bystrica	3/4 stars
10		Futbal Tatran Arena	6,500	Prešov	1. FC Tatran Prešov	3/4 stars
11		**Štadión Sihoť**	6,466	Trenčín	AS Trenčín	3/4 stars
12		NTC Poprad	5,700	Poprad	FK Poprad	3/4 stars
13		**Mestský štadión Komárno**	5,160	Komárno	KFC Komárno	3/4 stars
14		OMS ARENA Senica	5,070	Senica	FK Senica	2/4 stars
15		**Štadión pod Čebraťom**	4,876	Ružomberok	MFK Ružomberok	3/4 stars
16		**Mestský futbalový štadión**	4,440	Michalovce	MFK Zemplín Michalovce	2/4 stars
17		Mestský štadión Púchov	4,200	Púchov	MŠK Púchov	1/4 stars
18		Štadión FC ViOn	4,008	Zlaté Moravce	FC ViOn Zlaté Moravce	2/4 stars
19		**ZELPO Aréna**	4,000	Podbrezová	FK Železiarne Podbrezová	2/4 stars
20		Mestský štadión	3,842	Dubnica	MFK Dubnica	2/4 stars
21		Mestský štadión Bardejov	3,435	Bardejov	Partizán Bardejov	1/4 stars
22		**Mestský štadión Skalica**	3,300	Skalica	MFK Skalica	1/4 stars
23		NTC Senec	3,264	Senec	ŠK Senec	2/4 stars
24		Mestský štadión Brezno	3,222	Brezno	FK Brezno	1/4 stars
25		Stadium Myjava	2,709	Myjava	Spartak Myjava	1/4 stars
26		Steel Slovakia aréna	2,500	Moldava nad Bodvou	FK Bodva Moldava nad Bodvou	1/4 stars
27		Mestský štadión	2,309	Žiar nad Hronom	FK Pohronie	2/4 stars
28		Futbalový štadión Prievidza	2,250	Prievidza	FC Baník Prievidza	1/4 stars
29		Štadión MŠK Považská Bystrica	1,988	Považská Bystrica	MŠK Považská Bystrica	1/4 stars
30		Pomlé Stadium	1,950	Šamorín	FC ŠTK 1914 Šamorín	1/4 stars
31		Stadium Liptovský Mikuláš	1,900	Liptovský Mikuláš	MFK Tatran Liptovský Mikuláš	1/4 stars
32		Štadión Humenné	1,806	Humenné	FK Humenné	1/4 stars
33		Futbal Aréna Zvolen	1,780	Zvolen	MFK Lokomotíva Zvolen	1/4 stars
34		Na Zahradkach Stadium	1,680	Rimavská Sobota	MŠK Rimavská Sobota	1/4 stars
35		Mestský štadión	1,650	Spišská Nová Ves	FK Spišská Nová Ves	1/4 stars
36		Mestský mládežnícky štadión Radvaň	1,500	Banská Bystrica	FK Dukla Banská Bystrica B	1/4 stars
37		Stadium MFK Žarnovica	1,500	Žarnovica	MFK Žarnovica	1/4 stars
38		Stadium MFK Vranov nad Topľou	1,200	Vranov nad Topľou	MFK Vranov nad Topľou	1/4 stars
39		Šaľa Stadium	1,126	Šaľa	Slovan Duslo Šaľa	1/4 stars
40		Štadión Slovan Hlohovec	1,124	Hlohovec	FC Slovan Hlohovec	1/4 stars
41		PFK Piešťany stadium	1,008	Piešťany	PFK Piešťany	1/4 stars
42		Mestský štadión Trebišov	1,008	Trebišov	FK Slavoj Trebišov	1/4 stars

== Largest football stadiums ==
Bratislava		Trnava	Dunajská Streda
Tehelné pole	Štadión Pasienky	Anton Malatinský Stadium	MOL Aréna
Capacity: **22,500**	Capacity: **11,591**	Capacity: **18,200**	Capacity: **12,700**
Košice	List of football stadiums in Slovakia is located in Slovakia		Žilina
Košická futbalová aréna	List of football stadiums in Slovakia is located in Slovakia		Štadión pod Dubňom
Capacity: **12,555**	List of football stadiums in Slovakia is located in Slovakia		Capacity: **10,897**

== See also ==
- List of European stadiums by capacity
- List of association football stadiums by capacity
- Lists of stadiums
