= Ján Gajdošík =

Slovak football player

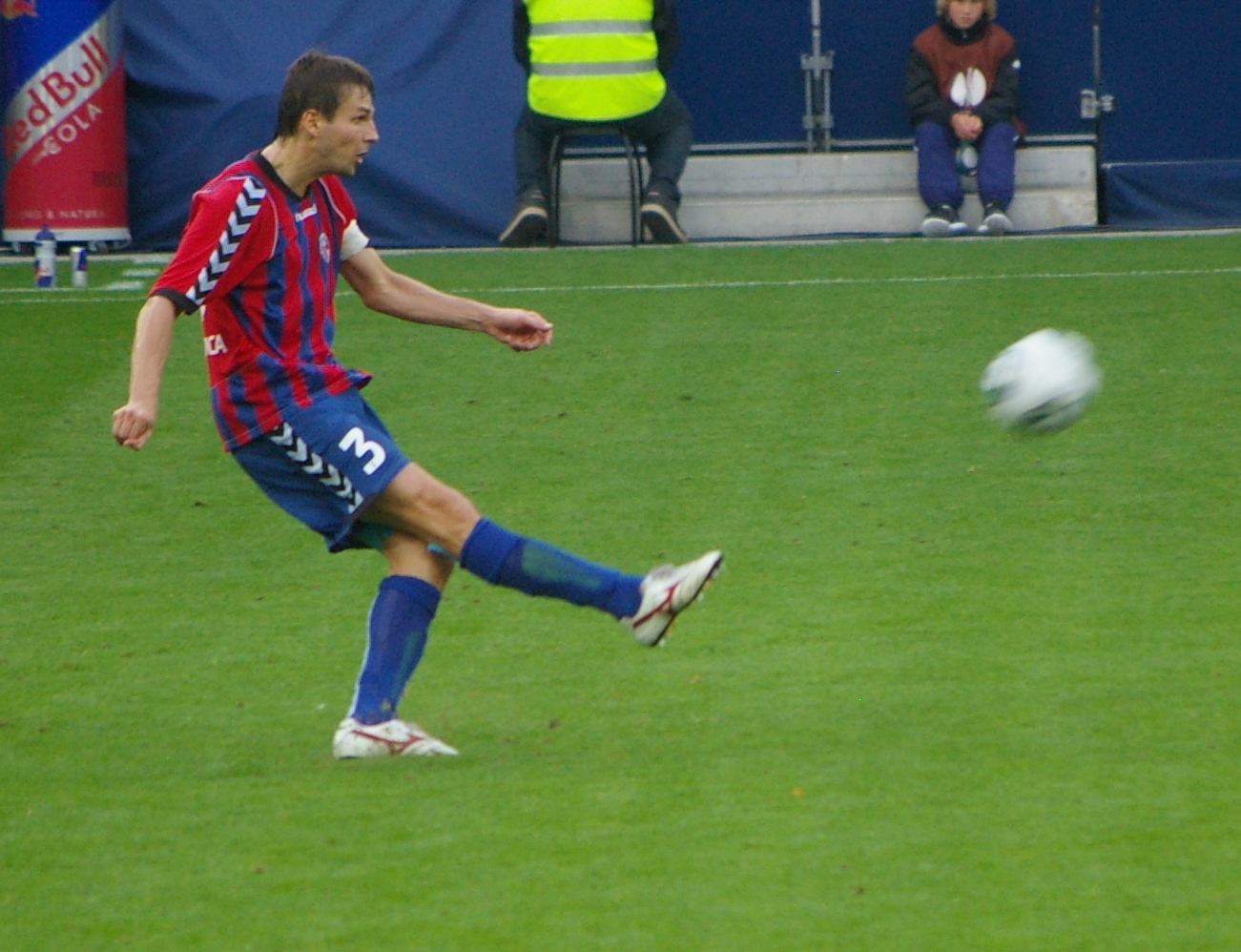

Personal information
- Date of birth: 12 October 1978 (age 48)
- Place of birth: Brezno, Czechoslovakia
- Height: 1.85 m (6 ft 1 in)
- Position: Centre back

Youth career
- Podbrezová

Senior career*
| Years | Team | Apps | (Gls) |
| 1994–2009 | Podbrezová | | |
| 2009–2013 | Senica | 68 | (3) |
| 2013 | Bohemians Prague | 0 | (0) |
| 2013–2014 | Podbrezová | 10 | (0) |
| 2016–2017 | ŠK Partizán Čierny Balog | | |
| 2017–2018 | ŠK Vinica | | |
| 2018–2019 | FK Brezno | | |

Managerial career
- 2014–2017: Podbrezová (youths)
- 2017: Podbrezová B
- 2017: Podbrezová (assistant)
- 2018: Pohronie (academy director)
- 2019–2024: Podbrezová (youths/ assistant/ video analytics)
- 2024–2025: FC Košice (academy director)
- 2025–: FC Košice (sport director)
- * Club domestic league appearances and goals as of 22 February 2019

Ján Gajdošík (born 12 October 1978) is a retired Slovak football defender.
