= Mestský štadión Brezno =

Football stadium in Brezno, Slovakia

- Municipal Stadium in Brezno
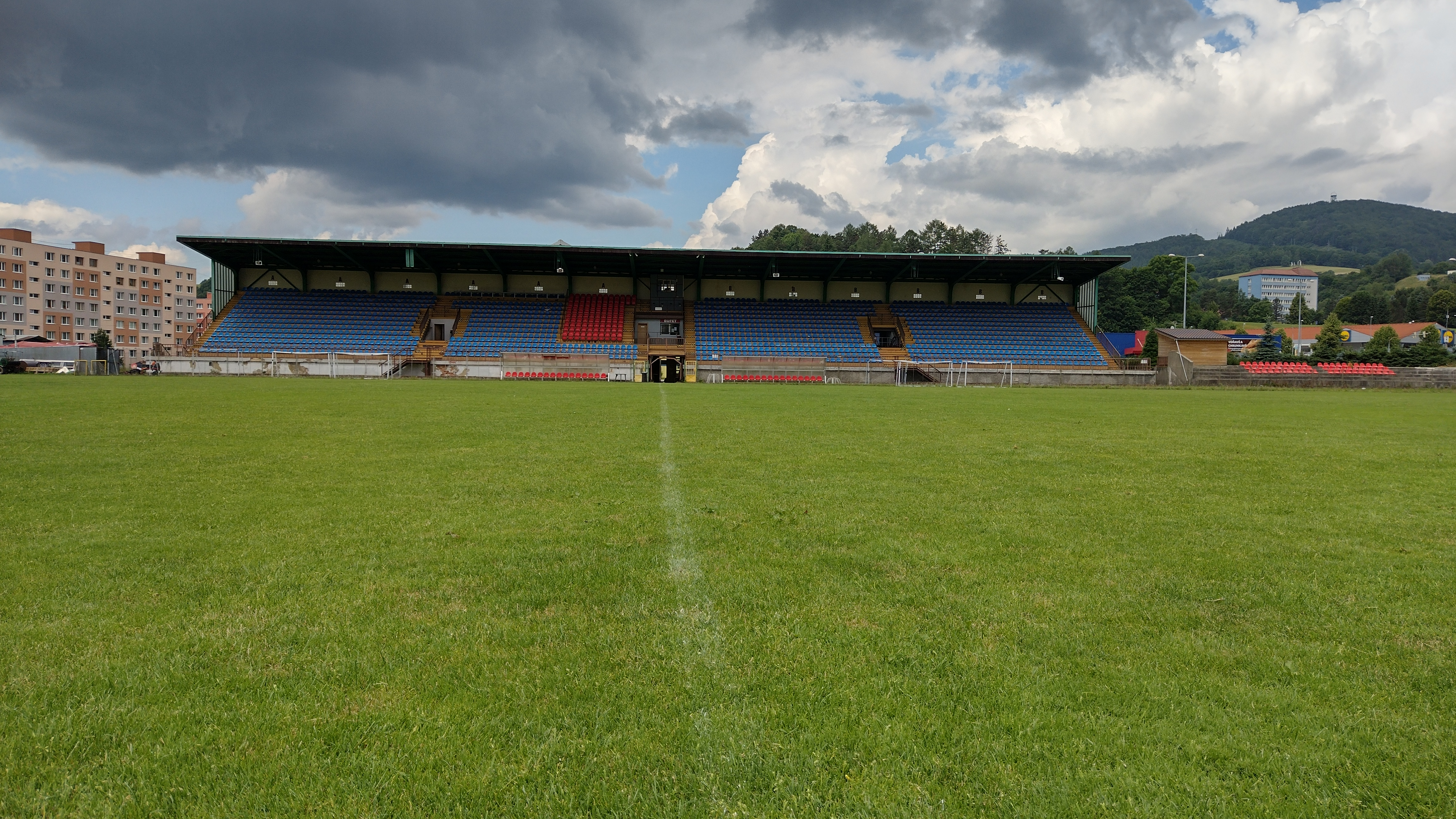
- Interactive map of Mestský štadión Brezno
- Full name: Mestský štadión Brezno
- Location: Štvrť L. Novomeského 34, 977 01 Brezno, Slovakia
- Coordinates: 48°48′22″N 19°37′47″E
- Owner: City of Brezno
- Capacity: 3,000
- Surface: Field (Grass)
- Field size: 105 x 68 meters

Tenants
- FK Brezno (–present); FO ŽP Šport Podbrezová (2014–2015, 2025–present)

The Municipal Stadium in Brezno, Slovakia, (Slovak: Mestský štadión Brezno) is the football (soccer) stadium. It mainly serves as home stadium for football club FK Brezno. It is used as a temporary home stadium for FK Železiarne Podbrezová which plays in the Slovak First Football League. The stadium has a capacity of 3,000.

== History ==
On June 7, 1994, the stadium hosted the final match of the first edition of the Slovak Cup. Slovan Bratislava would beat Tatran Prešov 2–1 after penalties.

== Other uses ==
The stadium also has a running track, which is used for training and tournaments by the athletes of AK Mostáreň and MŠK Brezno.

== See also ==
- List of football stadiums in Slovakia
