= Vladimír Mathern =

Slovak jurist (1928–2014)

Vladimír Mathern (13 December 1928 – 12 January 2014) was a Slovak jurist, law professor and the then rector of the Paneuropean University. From 1990 to 2003, he was a member of the Science institute of Comenius University. He was an author of many works and books. Mathern was born in Brezno on 13 December 1928, and died on 12 January 2014, at the age of 85.
