= Tatran Čierny Balog stadium =

Football stadium located in Čierny Balog, Slovakia

Coordinates: 48°44′19″N 19°40′28″E

Tatran Čierny Balog štadion
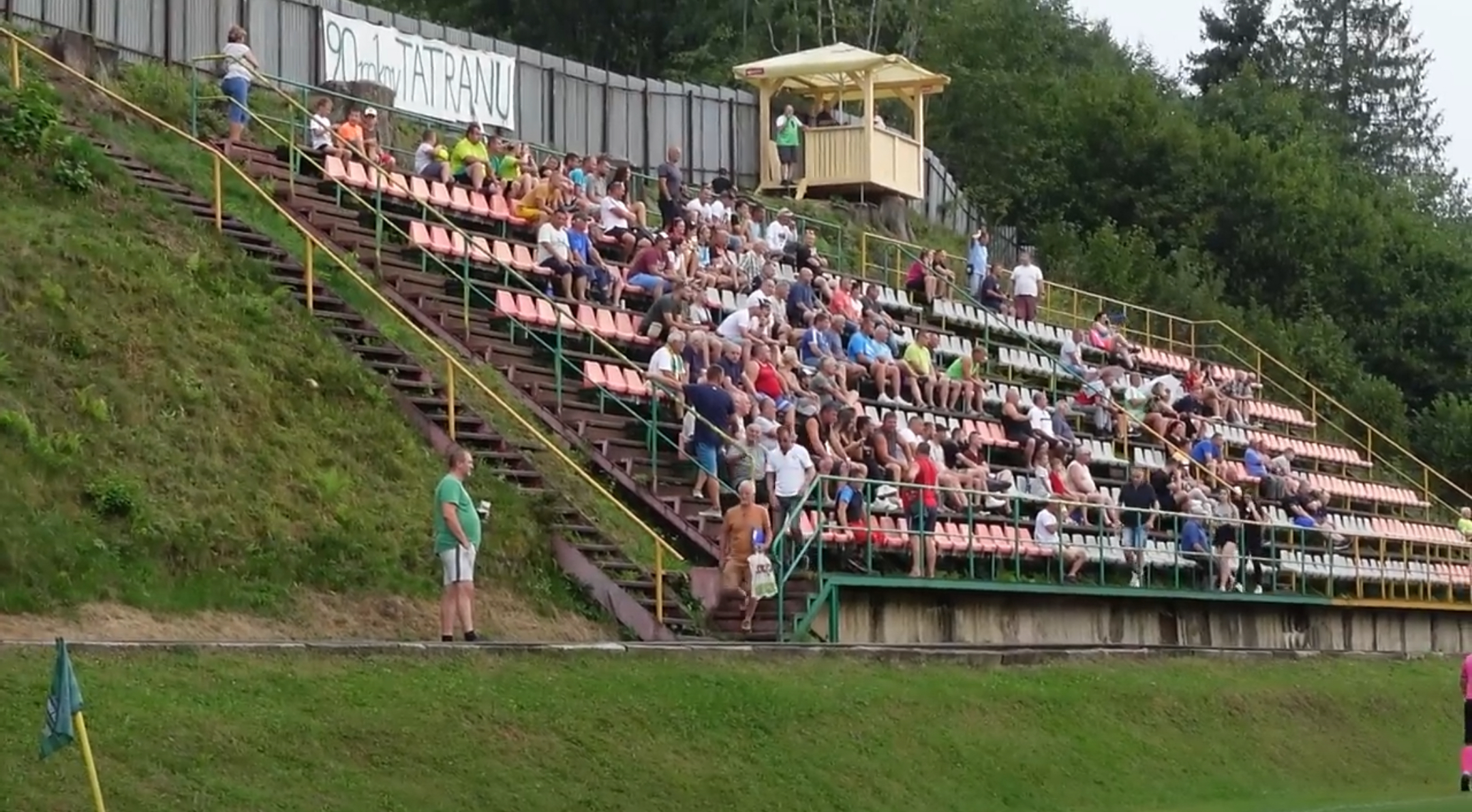
- The stadium in 2022
- Interactive map of Tatran Čierny Balog štadion
- Address: Čierny Balog, Slovakia
- Capacity: 480 (192 seats)
- Scoreboard: Yes

Construction
- Opened: 1980

Tenants
- TJ Tatran Čierny Balog

Tatran Čierny Balog stadium (Slovak: Tatran Čierny Balog štadion) is a football ground located in Čierny Balog, Slovakia, which is the home ground of the local football club TJ Tatran Čierny Balog. The ground is known for having an active train track that goes through the stadium, even during games.

== History ==
The Čiernohronská railway was built before the stadium itself. The train itself runs on the routes in the Slovak Ore Mountains. The network reached its greatest total length after World War II, with the entire track measuring 131.98 km. Before the suspension of traffic in 1982, only 36 km of the track was in operation. Operation on this track was suspended for a period of time, but in 1992 it was resumed in the direction of Vydrovo and only 6 years ago also to Dobroč. Of the original 132 kilometres of the track, only 20 have been preserved.

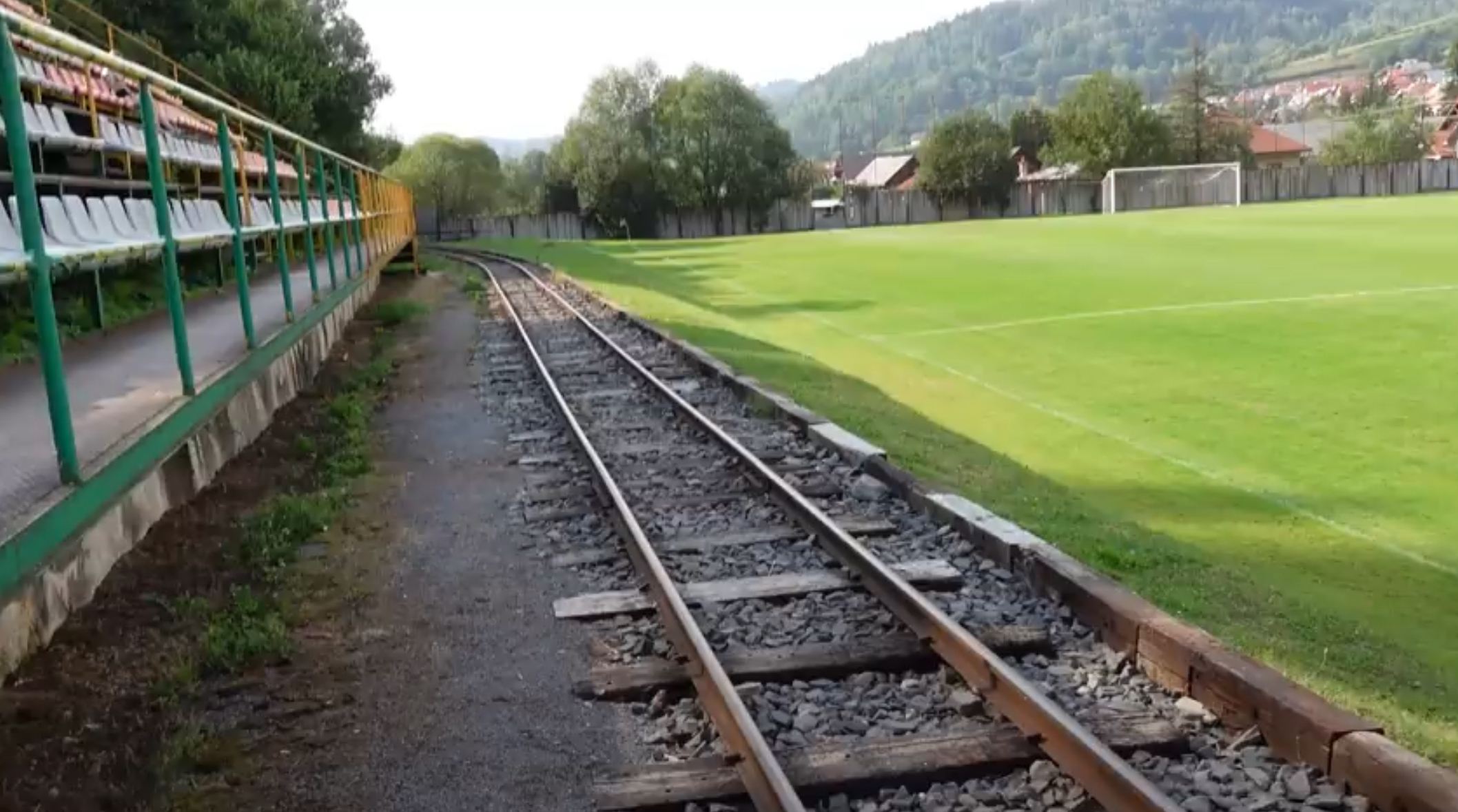
The track that is used by the train.

It was at the time when the track lost its function that a village football stand was built on the site. Now the train, which serves as an attraction for tourists, runs every day in the main season.

== Recognition ==
The municipal stadium located in Čierny Balog gained international recognition in late 2015, after a video clip that depicted a train entering the ground went viral. The field of play and the only grandstand are divided by narrow-gauge rails used by the Čierny Hron Railway. The line is believed to be the only railway in the world to pass through the middle of a football stadium, the tracks running along the front of a grandstand at the stadium belonging to the TJ Tatran Čierny Balog club.

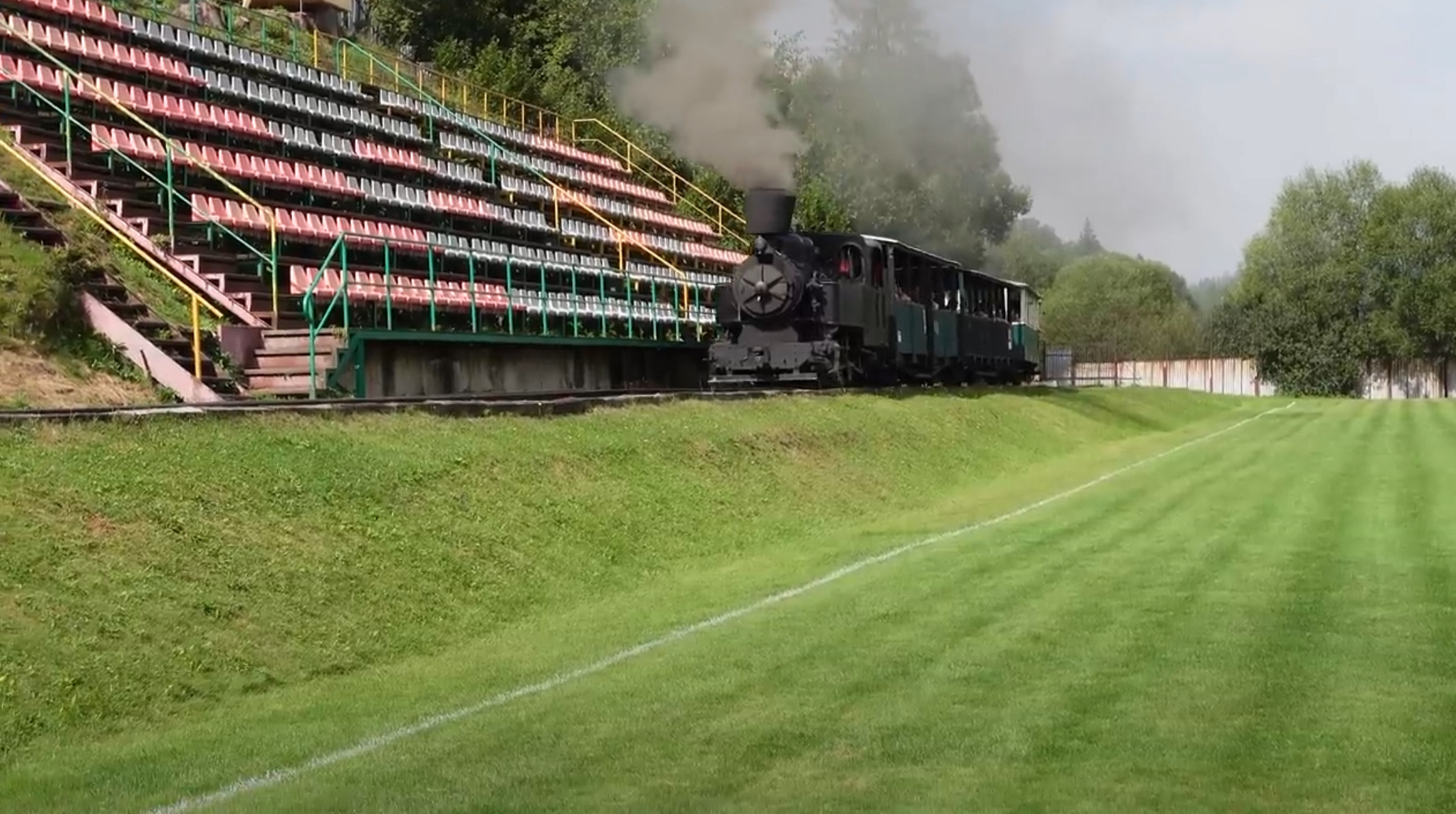
The train passing by the stadium.

The stadium, which is also registered as a national cultural monument of Slovakia, also gained international recognition.

A short demonstration of the match with a moving train made it into a web article by the British media portal Evening Standard, which named it the "weirdest stadium in the world." It also questioned how the steam and honking do not disturb the players or spectators.

On 23 August 2023, the stadium hosted a game against Slovak First Football League side FK Železiarne Podbrezová in the second round of the Slovak Cup. Podbrezová would go on to win the game 12–0 in front of 1,433 spectators.
