= Marián Strelec =

Slovak footballer (born 1971)

Personal information
- Date of birth: July 30, 1971 (age 55)
- Place of birth: Brezno, Slovakia
- Position: Left-back

Youth career
- Partizán Čierny Balog
- Tatran Čierny Balog
- Partizán Banská Bystrica
- Dukla Banská Bystrica

Senior career*
Years	Team	Apps	(Gls)
1989–1992	Dukla Banská Bystrica	47	(1)
1993–1997	Dukla Banská Bystrica	92	(8)
1998	FC VSS Košice (loan)	6	(0)
1998–2000	Dukla Banská Bystrica	48	(1)
2000–2001	Tatran Presov	6	(0)

International career
	Czechoslovakia U21	8	(0)
1994–2002	Slovakia	39	(0)

Managerial career
- 2025–: FK Brezno
- * Club domestic league appearances and goals

Marián Strelec (born 30 July 1971 in Brezno) is a former Slovak footballer who is currently the manager of FK Brezno.

Strelec started playing football at local clubs in Čierny Balog and Brezno, from where he later moved to clubs in the higher competitions.

He spent the most of his playing career with FK Dukla Banská Bystrica, where he played almost 200 matches in the top flight. He is among the top ten players with the highest number of matches in the club's history.

After retiring from his playing career, he became a youth coach and, later manager.

== Club career ==
=== Early career ===
Born in Brezno, Strelec started playing for neighboring village clubs Partizán and Tatran Čierny Balog at a young age.

=== Dukla Banská Bystrica ===
Following Dukla's 3–2 loss against Borussia Mönchengladbach in the 1989/1990 season, Strelec joined the club. In July 1991, he played in the Intertoto Cup with Dukla. The first match was against the Swedish side, Hammarby Stockholm at the Söderstadion stadium, where at the beginning of the match, he scored the opening goal, contributing to Dukla's victory. Almost a decade later, in September 1999, in the first round of the UEFA Cup against Ajax Amsterdam, Strelec would play as a left winger rather that a left back in both legs. In the first leg in the Netherlands, Dukla would lose 6–1 after leading a portion of the game 1–0. The return leg in Banská Bystrica would also result in a loss, losing 3–1 after taking the lead in the 44th minute.

== Post-playing career ==
In 2015, Strelec became the head coach of the under-19 youth team of Dukla Banská Bystrica. He was later also the club's technical director. In 2025, he became the manager of 5th league side, FK Brezno.
