= Karol Kuzmány =

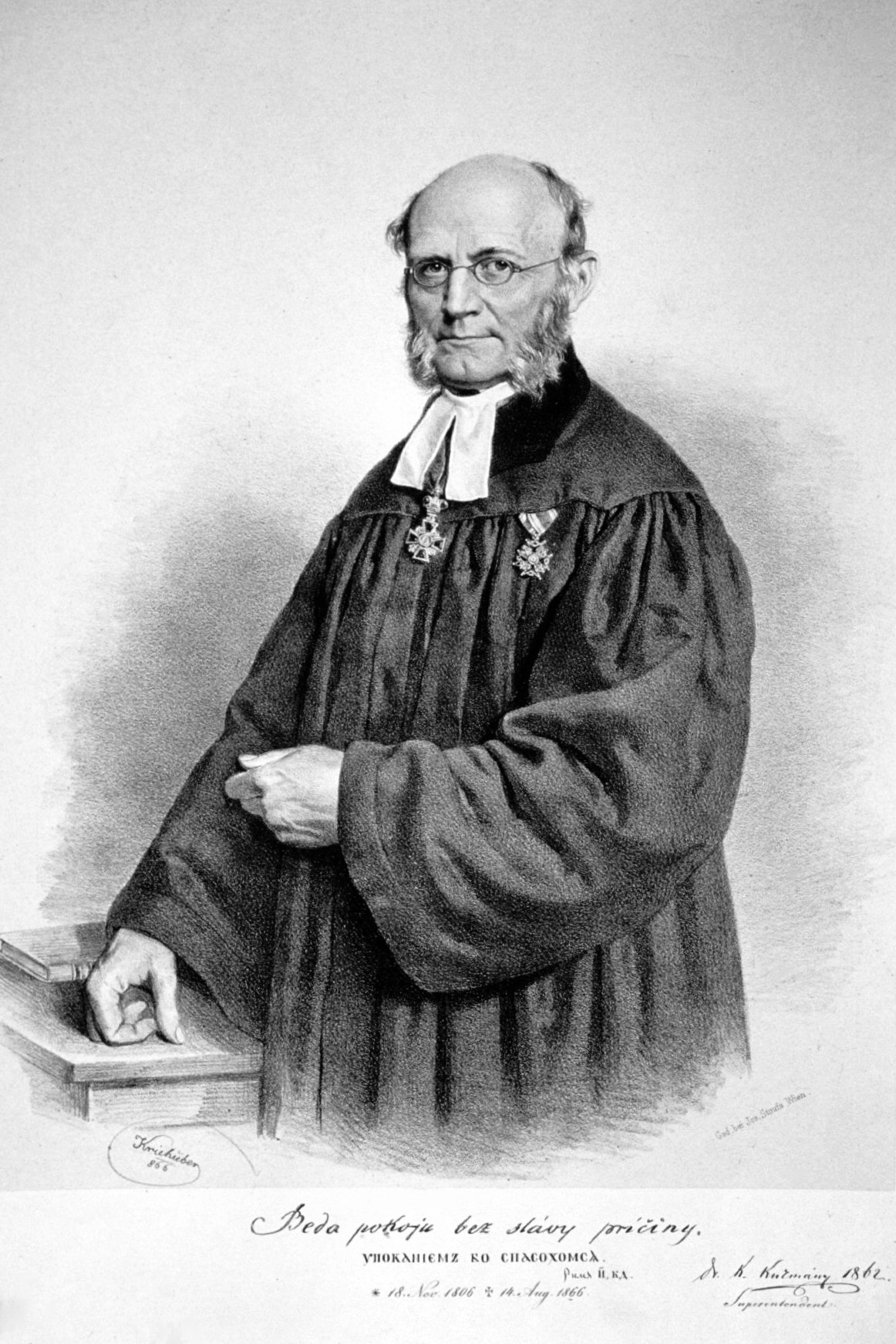
Lithograph of Kuzmány by Josef Kriehuber, 1866

Karol Kuzmány (Hungarian: Kuzmány Károly; 16 November 1806 – 14 August 1866) was a Slovak Lutheran pastor, writer, and theologian in the Kingdom of Hungary, with a focus on philosophy and aesthetics. He studied at the University of Jena in Germany between 1828 and 1829.

== Life ==
Kuzmány was born on 16 November 1806 in Brezno. He returned to Slovakia after his education and became a chaplain in Banská Bystrica in 1830, later serving as a pastor there and in Zvolen. In 1849 he became professor of practical theology at the University of Vienna and began to publish works on theology. In 1860 he was elected superintendent (an ecclesiastical position equivalent in the Lutheran church to that of bishop), serving the Bratislava superintendency.

Kuzmány was a co-founder and vice-president of the Slovak League (Slovak: Matica slovenská). The group, which promoted Slovak culture and learning during the time of the Austro-Hungarian Empire, first met in 1863. As vice-president, Kuzmány was responsible for directing the group's activities, a responsibility he maintained through 1870. He worked to improve the legal status of both Lutherans and Slovaks in the Empire.

Kuzmány died on 14 August 1866 in Štubnianske Teplice. He is buried at the National Cemetery in Martin. His likeness appears on a Slovak postage stamp and a Europa Coin from 2006.

== Bibliography ==
- Gluchman, Vasil (2011). "MARTIN RÁZUS: Literary and Philosophical Reflections on Morality". The Journal of Religious Ethics. 39 (1): 151–172. doi:10.1111/j.1467-9795.2010.00468.x. JSTOR 23020128.
- Kimball, Stanley B. (November 1973). "The Austro-Slav Revival: A Study of Nineteenth-Century Literary Foundations". Transactions of the American Philosophical Society. 63 (4): 1–83. doi:10.2307/1006167. JSTOR 1006167.
- Spong, Colin W., ed. (June 2006). "New Issues (Slovak)" (PDF). Czechout: Journal of the Czechoslovak Philatelic Society of Great Britain. 24 (2): 36–60 – via czechout.org.
- Wengert, Timothy J., ed. (2017-08-22). Dictionary of Luther and the Lutheran Traditions. Baker Academic. ISBN 9781493410231.
