= Europa Coins 2006 =

European commemorative currency

For 2006, at least 13 European countries have joined together to create the Silver Series for Europe. The theme for 2006 is distinguished European figures. The following are the countries that issue a Europa Coin in 2006:

Country	Person	Date
Austria	Wolfgang Amadeus Mozart	
Belgium	Justus Lipsius	February 2006
Czech Republic	Jaroslav Ježek	
Finland	Johan Vilhelm Snellman	
France	Robert Schuman	
Hungary	Béla Bartók	
Ireland	Samuel Beckett	
Italy	Leonardo da Vinci	
Malta	Themistocles Zammit	
Netherlands	Rembrandt van Rijn	
Portugal	Henry the Navigator	
Slovakia	Karol Kuzmány	
Spain	Charles V	
