= Dušan Švantner =

Slovak politician

Dušan Švantner is a member of Slovak National Party. He was a member of the National Council of the Slovak Republic from 1994 to 1998 and from 1998 to 2002. He was born in Brezno and still lives there.
