= TJ Tatran Čierny Balog =

Slovak football club

Tatran Čierny Balog
- Full name: TJ Tatran Čierny Balog
- Founded: 29 July 1933; 92 years ago
- Stadium: Tatran Čierny Balog stadium
- Capacity: 480 (192 seats)
- League: 6. Liga

TJ Tatran Čierny Balog is a Slovak football club based in the village of Čierny Balog in the Banská Bystrica region.

The club holds a rivalry with the team from the same village, ŠK Partizán Čierny Balog. Partizán is known for producing players such as Michal Faško, Šimon Faško, and Matej Podstavek.

In 2015, the club’s stadium, Tatran Čierny Balog stadium, gained international recognition following the viral spread of a short video clip that depicted a train going through the ground.

On 29 July 2023, the club celebrated its 90th year of existence.

== History ==
=== 2022–present: Recent years ===
Tatran Čierny Balog won the seventh league of the ObFZ Banská Bystrica in 2022. Thanks to the triumph, they advanced to the sixth league, the lowest regional competition of the SsFZ, and could therefore also play in the Slovnaft Cup.

In TJ Tatran’s first 2023–24 Slovnaft Cup game, they were drawn with their rivals ŠK Partizán Čierny Balog. The big derby was played in Čierny Balog, where Taran hosted Partizán. In front of 1,090 spectators, the game ended in a 3–3 draw, with Tatran winning the game 5–4 in the penalty shoot-out.

In the second round of the Slovnaft cup, on 23 August 2023, Tatran hosted a game against Slovak First Football League side FK Železiarne Podbrezová. Podbrezová would go on to win the game 12–0 in front of 1,433 spectators.

== Stadium ==
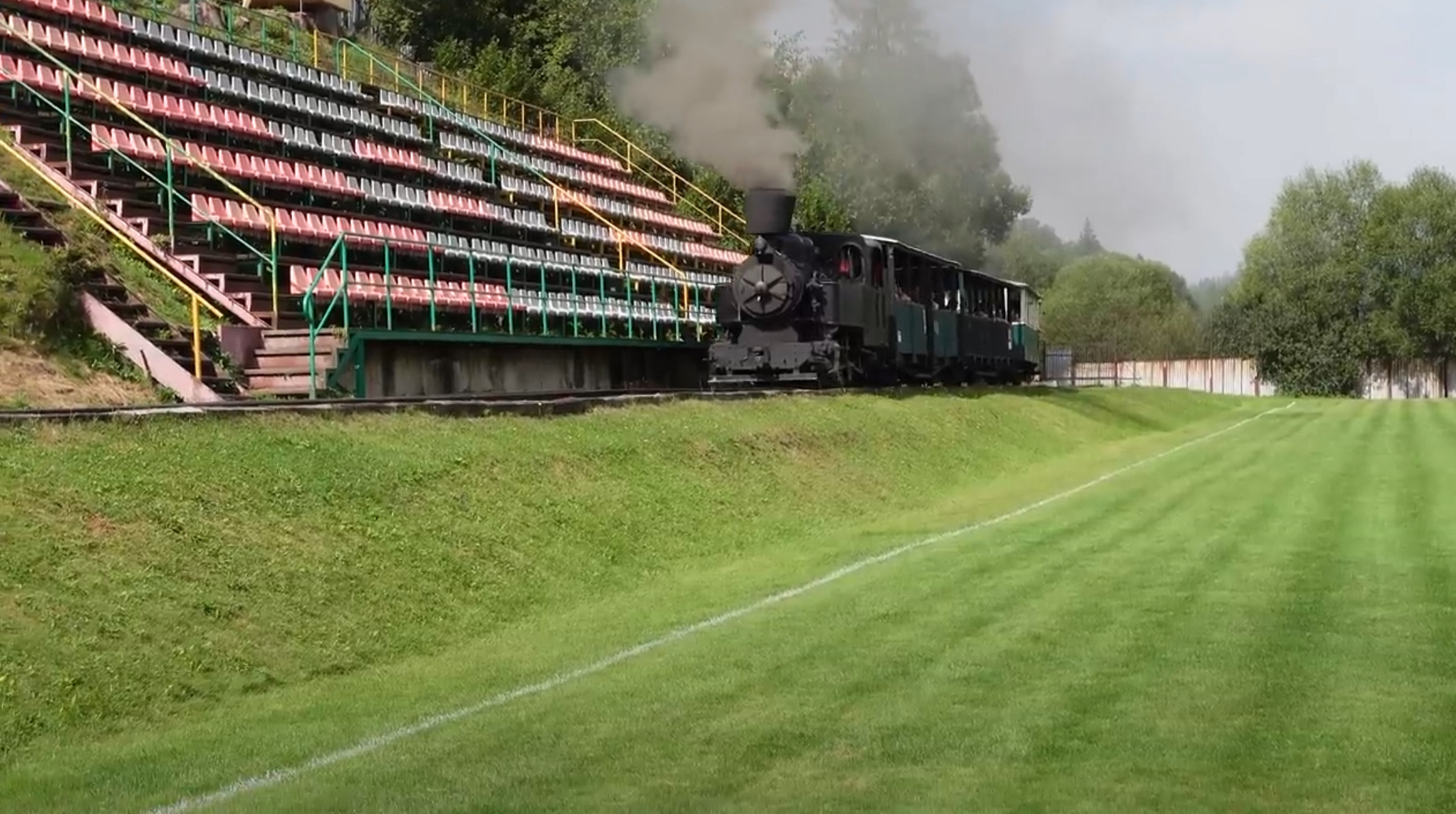
The train passing by the stadium.

The Tatran Čierny Balog stadium located in Čierny Balog gained international recognition in late 2015, following the viral spread of a short video clip that depicted a train entering the ground. The field of play and the only grandstand are divided by narrow-gauge rails used by the Čierny Hron Railway. During the summer season trains filled with tourists run through the stadium every day. The line is believed to be the only railway in the world to pass through the middle of a football stadium, the tracks running along the front of a grandstand at the stadium belonging to the TJ Tatran Čierny Balog club.

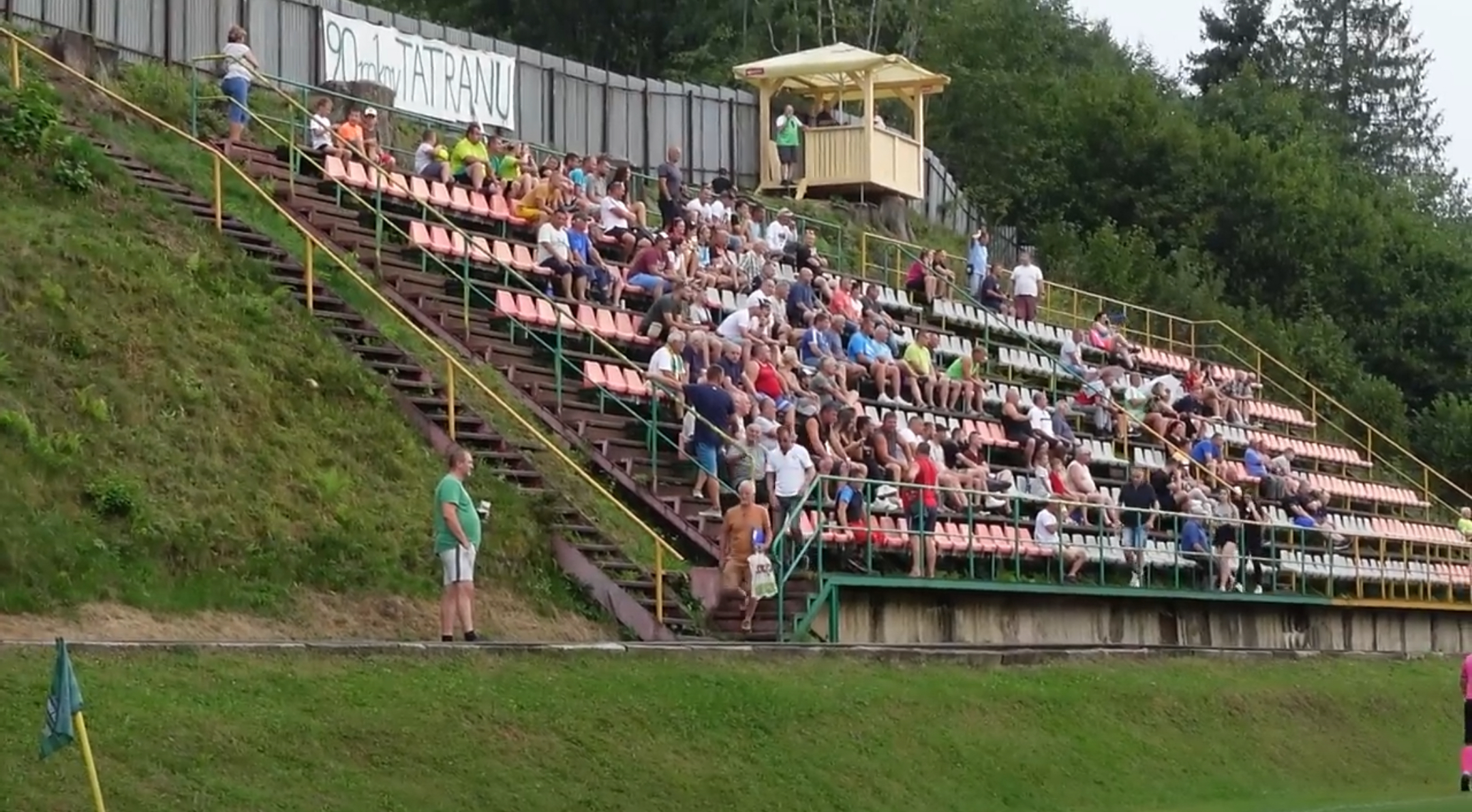
The stadium during a match.

A short demonstration of the match with a moving train made it into a web article by the British media portal Evening Standard, which named it the "weirdest stadium in the world." It also pointed out how “it is possible that the steam and honking do not disturb the players or the spectators present”.

The stadium holds 192 seats.

== Rivalries ==
Tatran Čierny Balog’s rival is with ŠK Partizán Čierny Balog, a club from the same village that plays in the 5. Liga. Derby matches between the teams usually have high attendances.

== Notable players ==
Notable players that played for Tatran. Players in bold later represented their country internationally.

- (Slovakia) **Viktor Pečovský**
- (Slovakia) **Marián Strelec**

== See also ==
- List of football clubs in Slovakia
