= Jozef Karika =

Slovak experimental publicist and writer (born 1978)

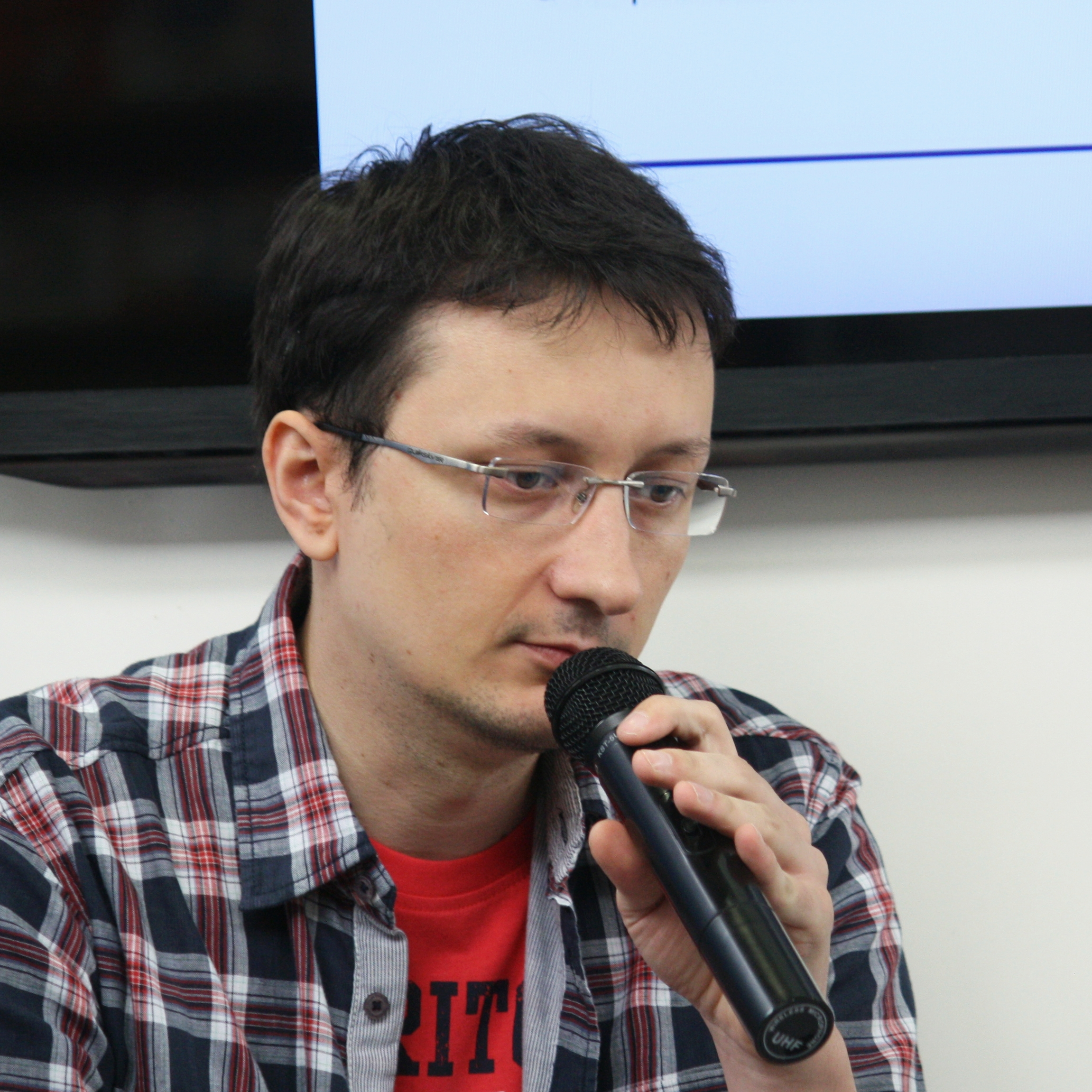
Jozef Karika

Jozef Karika (born November 15, 1978, in Brezno) is a Slovak experimental publicist and writer. He studied history and philosophy at Matej Bel's University in Banská Bystrica. He is the author of the bestseller In the shadow of Mafia. He was awarded the Prize of Literary Fund (Cena Literárneho fondu).

As a reporter of a regional TV channel based in Ružomberok, he pointed to the case of Slovak Catholic priest Ján Ferenčík, who, despite his wartime admiration for Nazi dictator Adolf Hitler, was later celebrated by placing a commemorative plaque on the town hall in Ružomberok.

== Work ==
=== Slovak books ===
- 2007 - Mágia peňazí (Ikar, ISBN 978-80-551-1366-1)
- 2007 - Kurz praktickej mágie pre začiatočníkov (Ikar, ISBN 978-80-551-1568-9)
- 2012 - Na smrť (Ikar, ISBN 978-80-551-3170-2)
- 2013 - Na smrť II (Bez milosti) (Ikar, ISBN 978-80-551-3581-6)
- 2014 - Strach (Ikar, ISBN 9788055139654)
- 2015 - Tma (Ikar, ISBN 9788055143620)
- 2015 - Čierna hra: Vláda mafie (Ikar, ISBN 9788055144511)
- 2016 - Trhlina (Ikar, ISBN 9788055151465)
- 2017 - Mafiánska trilógia: V tieni mafie, V tieni mafie II, Nepriateľ štátu
- 2017 - Čierny rok: Vojna mafie (Ikar, ISBN 9788055157528)
- 2018 - Priepasť (Ikar, ISBN 9788055164014)
- 2020 - Smršť (Ikar, ISBN 9788055175294)
- 2021 - Hlad (Poviedky) (Ikar, ISBN 9788055180823)
- 2021 - Smäd (Poviedky) (Ikar, ISBN 9788055180830)
- 2023 - Hlbina (Ikar, ISBN 9788055191218)

=== Czech books ===
- 2003 - Slovanská magie (Vodnář, ISBN 80-86226-41-7)
- 2005 - Zóny stínu (Vodnář, ISBN 80-86226-57-3)
- 2008 - Magie peněz (Vodnář, ISBN 978-80-86226-78-1)
- 2009 - Brány meonu (Vodnář, ISBN 978-80-87146-97-2)

=== English books ===
- 2009 - Liber 767 vel Boeingus (ISBN 9781905713400)
