= Čierny Hron Railway =

Railway in the Slovak Ore Mountains

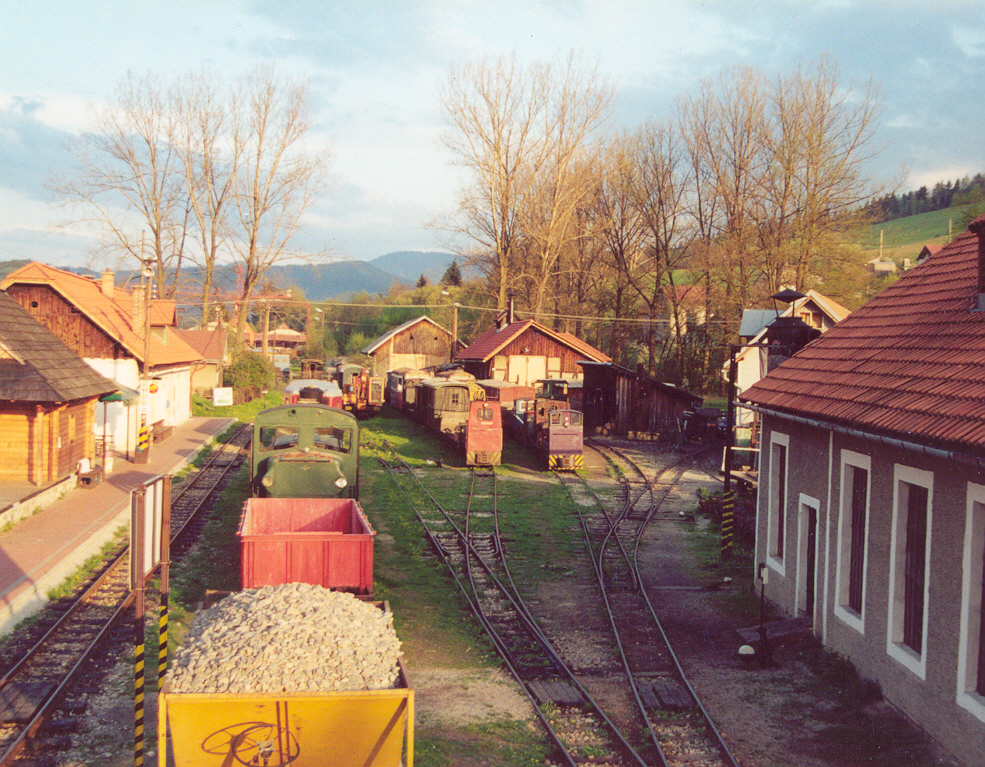
- Čierny Hron Railway at the station in Čierny Balog

Overview
- Native name: Čiernohronská železnica
- Locale: Slovakia

Service
- Route number: 900

Technical
- Line length: 17 km (11 miles)
- Track gauge: 760 mm (2 ft 5 15/16 in) Bosnian gauge
- Operating speed: 15 km/h (9.3 mph)

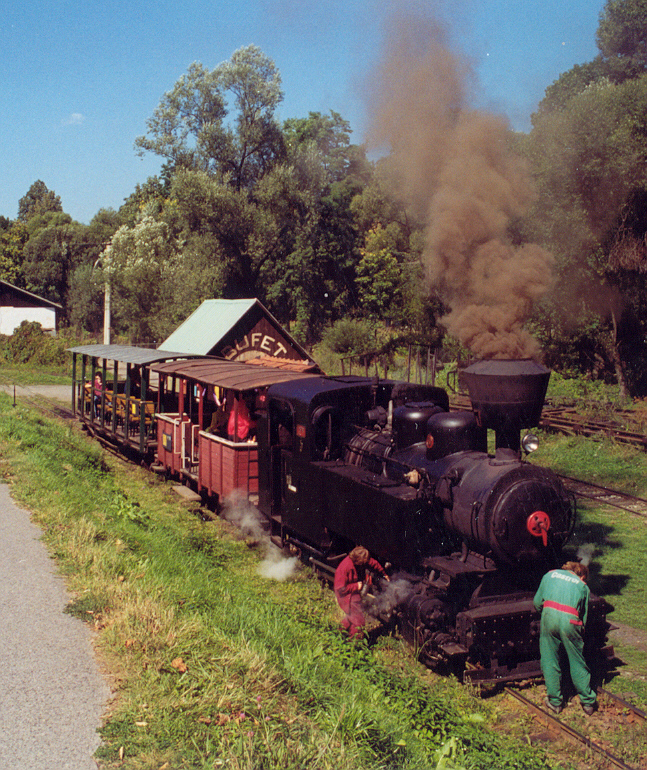
A train is readied for travel from Hronec to Čierny Balog.

The Čierny Hron Railway (in Slovak: Čiernohronská železnica or ČHŽ) is a narrow gauge railway in the Slovak Ore Mountains, built as a forest railway for logging operations.

== History ==
Planning for the railway began in 1898 and building began in 1908. In 1909 regular wood transport on the railway started, between Čierny Balog and Hronec. The network was extended to transport wood from the forests and by the middle of the 20th century the railway had a total length of 131,97 km, the most extensive forestry railway network in Czechoslovakia.

On 19 July 1927, passenger traffic was permitted on the railway between Čierny Balog and Hronec, which operated until 1962.

The railway was closed in 1982, but it has been granted national heritage status since. During the following few years it was repaired by enthusiasts and re-opened in 1992 as a heritage railway for tourists. The line is now 17 km (11 mi) long: Chvatimech - Hronec - Čierny Balog - Vydrovo.

The line is believed to be the only railway in the world to pass through the middle of a football stadium, the tracks running along the front of a grandstand at the Tatran Čierny Balog stadium belonging to the TJ Tatran Čierny Balog club.

The management is seeking to restore the line as a working means of transportation through the resumption of commercial timber haulage and commuter service. For this reason, they acquired the secondhand 750mm-gauge interurban cars from the Waldenburgerbahn in Switzerland upon its regauging in 2021; test runs with diesel generators have been conducted with scheduled passenger service planned once the line is electrified.

== Motive Power ==
Identity	Works Number	Type	Gauge	Builder	Year built	Previous Operator	Status	Notes	Image
BNE 50 Č			760 mm (2 ft 5 15/16 in)	Stavostroj Rodotínská					
BNE 50 F			760 mm (2 ft 5 15/16 in)	Stavostroj Rodotínská					
BNE 50 Z			760 mm (2 ft 5 15/16 in)	Stavostroj Rodotínská					
BN 30 Azor			760 mm (2 ft 5 15/16 in)						
DDB 75			760 mm (2 ft 5 15/16 in)	Deutz					
DDB 120			760 mm (2 ft 5 15/16 in)	Deutz					
Bn60H 900			760 mm (2 ft 5 15/16 in)						
PETKA		4wDM	760 mm (2 ft 5 15/16 in)						
DH120			760 mm (2 ft 5 15/16 in)	Poldi					
TU24.001			760 mm (2 ft 5 15/16 in)	Stavostroj Rodotínská				BN 50	
SČM 4; 36 005		4wDE	760 mm (2 ft 5 15/16 in)	Stavostroj Rodotínská					
TU24 901; LIENKA		4wDM	760 mm (2 ft 5 15/16 in)	Škoda Works			Operational		
		0-4-0DM	760 mm (2 ft 5 15/16 in)	ČKD			Plinthed		
ČHLD 2 Joy	1679	0-6-0WT	760 mm (2 ft 5 15/16 in)	Budapest	1909			Not the original ČHLD 2	
PLD 2	4280	0-8-0T	760 mm (2 ft 5 15/16 in)	MÁVAG Budapest	1916		Operational	U45.903	
3	625	0-6-0T	760 mm (2 ft 5 15/16 in)	Smoschewer	1918				
M21 004	54125	Railcar	760 mm (2 ft 5 15/16 in)	Ringhoffer	1939		Operational		
ČHLD 6	5277	0-8-0T	760 mm (2 ft 5 15/16 in)	MÁVAG Budapest	1942			U46.901	
3	2209	0-6-0T	760 mm (2 ft 5 15/16 in)	ČKD	1948	Železene Podbresna			
ČHLD 5	2611	0-6-0T	760 mm (2 ft 5 15/16 in)	ČKD	1948			U35.902	
1	2609		760 mm (2 ft 5 15/16 in)	ČKD	1948			U35.901	
ČHLD 7	2610	0-6-0T	760 mm (2 ft 5 15/16 in)	ČKD	1948		Plinthed at Vydrovo	U35.903	
	3611	0-6-0T	1,435 mm (4 ft 8 1/2 in)	ČKD	1957	Železene Podbresna	Plinthed		
764.407	604	0-8-0T	760 mm (2 ft 5 15/16 in)	Reghin	1958			Rebuilt at Kolin 2014	
	024	B-B DH	760 mm (2 ft 5 15/16 in)	Rába	1961			TU 45.003	
	025	B-B DH	760 mm (2 ft 5 15/16 in)	Rába	1961			TU 45.002 (green)	
	027	B-B DH	760 mm (2 ft 5 15/16 in)	Rába	1961		Operational	TU 45.001 (Red/White)	
TU 48.001	21583		760 mm (2 ft 5 15/16 in)		1972			Lxd2.302	
Bn60H		0-4-0DH	760 mm (2 ft 5 15/16 in)	TSM	1970s	Keramica Soukup S.R.			
(Unnumbered)	3853	0-4-0DM	1,435 mm (4 ft 8 1/2 in)	ČKD	1956		Plinthed at Chvatimech		

== See also ==
- The Historical Logging Switchback Railway in Vychylovka
- List of transport museums in Slovakia
- List of museums in Slovakia
