= Čierny Balog =

Čierny Balog Feketebalog
- Municipality
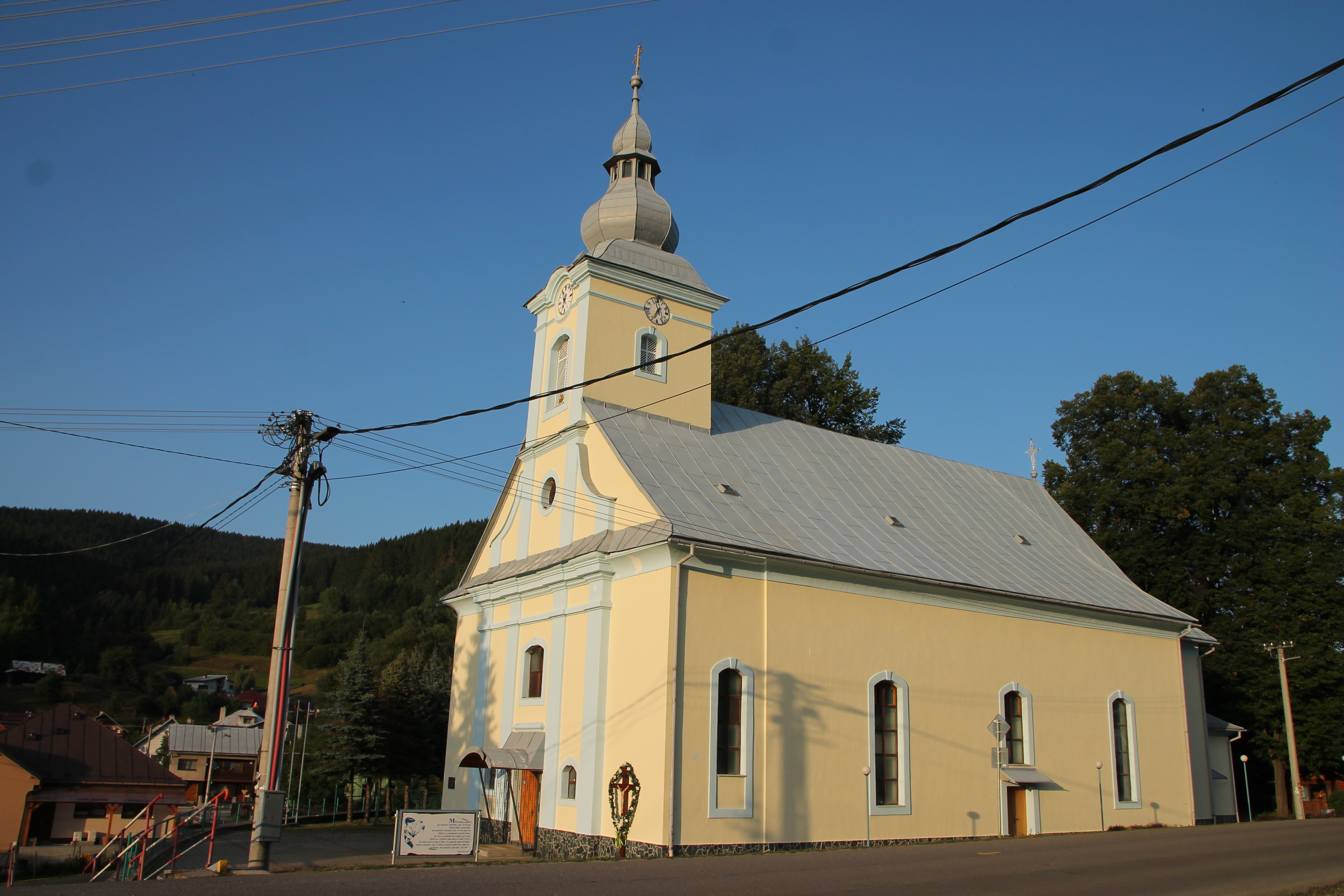

- Flag Coat of arms

- Location of Čierny Balog in the Banská Bystrica Region Location of Čierny Balog in Slovakia
- Coordinates: 48.75°N 19.67°E
- Country: Slovakia
- Region: Banská Bystrica Region
- District: Brezno District
- First mentioned: 1863

Area
  - Total: 147.17 km^{2} (56.82 sq mi)
- Elevation: 555 m (1,821 ft)

Population (2025)
  - Total: 4,887
- Time zone: UTC+1 (CET)
  - Summer (DST): UTC+2 (CEST)
- Postal code: 976 52
- Area code: +421 48
- Vehicle registration plate (until 2022): BR
- Website: www.ciernybalog.sk

Čierny Balog (until 1888 also Balog or Čierny Hronec; Hungarian: Feketebalog) is a municipality in Brezno District, in the Banská Bystrica Region of central Slovakia.

== Geography ==
The municipality lies at an altitude of 555 metres (1,821 ft) and covers an area of 147.17 km^{2} (56.82 sq mi) (2025).

== History ==
The first written record of the settlement in the area dates back to 1607 when the Emperor Rudolf II. issued a decree to regulate the growing timber industry in the region. Čierny Balog arose in 1888 through a merger of thirteen villages, i.e., Balog, Krám, Dobroč, Dolina, Fajtov, Jánošovka, Jergov, Komov, Látky, Medveďov, Pustô, Vydrovo, and Závodie. Until 1918, it belonged to Austria-Hungary as part of Zólyom County (Slovak: Zvolenská stolica/Zvolenská župa: Zvolenská stolica). It played an important role during World War II as one of the centers of the anti-Fascist Slovak National uprising, and in the Battle of Čierny Balog. By 2024 the largest village in the Banská Bystrica Region, it punches well above its weight due to the number of notable natives, as well as its cultural and natural heritage such as the Čierny Hron Railway and Dobroč Primeval Forest.

== Population ==
Population statistic (10 years)
Year	1995	2005	2015	2025
Count	5124	5198	5168	4887
Difference		+1.44%	−0.57%	−5.43%

Population statistic
Year	2024	2025
Count	4916	4887
Difference		−0.58%

It has a population of 4887 people (31 December 2025).

=== Ethnicity ===
Census 2021 (1+ %)
Ethnicity	Number	Fraction
Slovak	4886	96.52%
Not found out	125	2.46%
Romani	77	1.52%
Total	5062	

In year 2021 was 5062 people by ethnicity 4886 as Slovak, 125 as Not found out, 77 as Romani, 25 as Czech, 5 as Polish, 5 as Moravian, 4 as Russian, 4 as Other, 3 as Croatian, 2 as Hungarian, 1 as Irish, 1 as Ukrainian, 1 as Italian, 1 as Serbian, 1 as Rusyn, 1 as Romanian and 1 as German.

Note on population: The difference values of population numbers in the table "Population statistic" and in the sections "Ethnicity" & "Religion" is caused by the use of various statistical methods.

=== Religion ===
Census 2021 (1+ %)
Religion	Number	Fraction
Roman Catholic Church	4173	82.44%
None	566	11.18%
Not found out	176	3.48%
Total	5062	

In year 2021 was 5062 people by religion 4173 from Roman Catholic Church, 566 from None, 176 from Not found out, 43 from Evangelical Church, 29 from Greek Catholic Church, 20 from Christian Congregations in Slovakia, 17 from Ad hoc movements, 12 from Jehovah's Witnesses, 9 from Other, 5 from Islam, 4 from Eastern Orthodox Church, 3 from Calvinist Church, 3 from Other and not ascertained christian church, 1 from Paganism and natural spirituality and 1 from Apostolic Church.

== Sport ==
=== Football ===
The village is the base of the clubs TJ Tatran Čierny Balog and ŠK Partizán Čierny Balog. Partizán is known for producing players such as Michal Faško, Šimon Faško, and Matej Podstavek. The clubs hold a rivalry with each other.

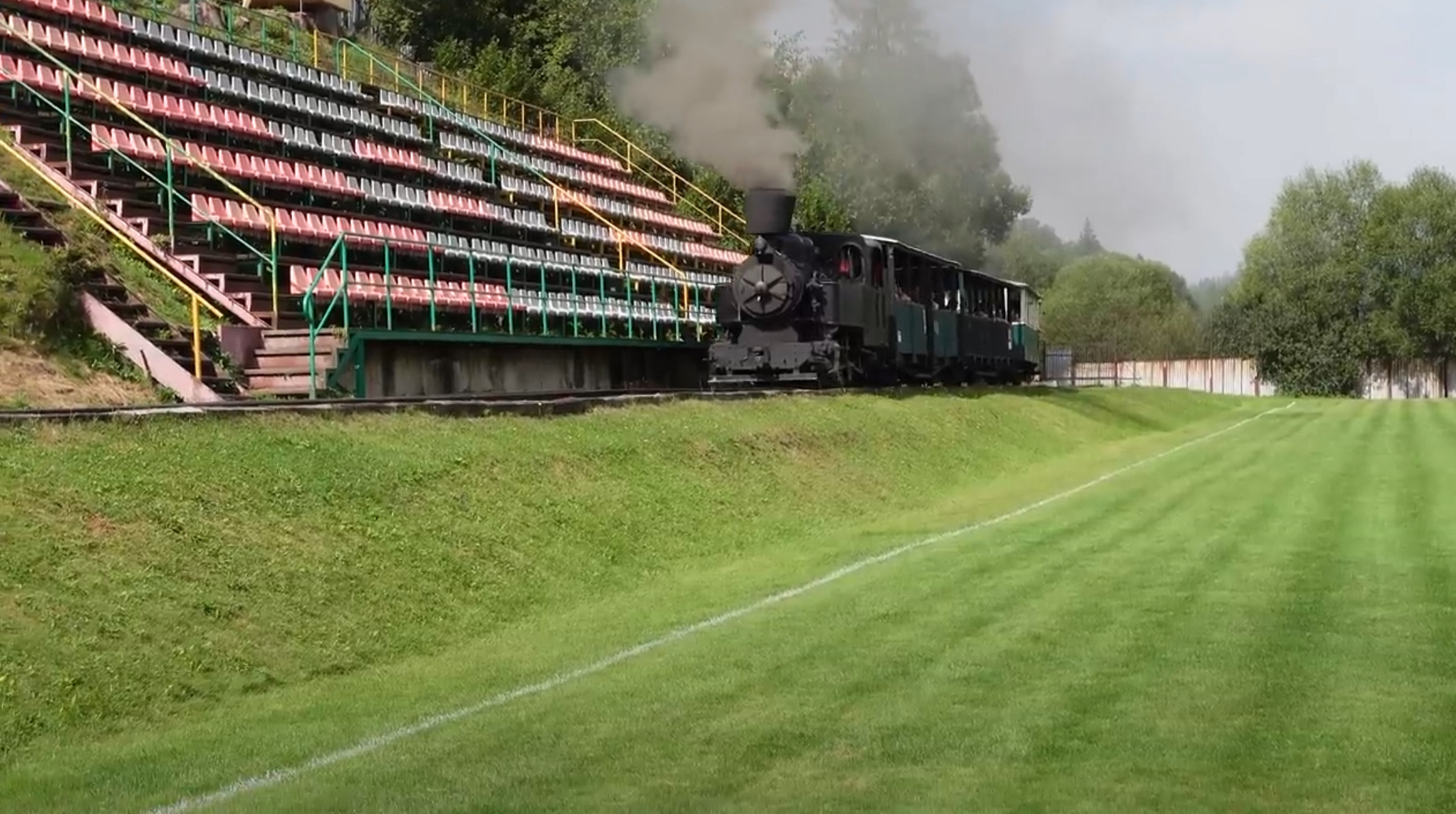
Train going through the stadium.

The village is home to the Tatran Čierny Balog stadium, which got international recognition after a video showing a train passing through the stadium went viral.

== Notable natives ==
- Jozef Dekrét Matejovie (* 1774 – † 1841), pioneer in forest restoration and founder of modern forestry
- Róbert Albert Gottier (* 1897 – † 1968), functionary of the Communist Party of Czechoslovakia, organizer of the anti-fascist movement and the Slovak National Uprising in Horehronie. Vice-President of the National Assembly (1945–1954)
- Ladislav Ťažký (* 1924 – † 2011), prose writer, journalist, playwright, and screenwriter
- Jozef Kliment (* 1928 – † 2007), agricultural expert and university professor
- Anton Auxt (* 1931 – † 1987), educator and mathematician
- Anton Dekrét (* 1932), mathematician and university educator
- Peter Kováčik (* 1936), prose writer, playwright, and film screenwriter
- Tibor Šagát, (* 1942), physician and politician

== Twin towns – sister cities ==
Čierny Balog is twinned with:

- Týniště nad Orlicí, Czech Republic

== See also ==
- Čierny Hron Railway
- List of municipalities and towns in Slovakia

== Genealogical resources ==
The records for genealogical research are available at the state archive "Státný archiv in Banska Bystrica, Slovakia"

- Roman Catholic church records (births/marriages/deaths): 1656–1896 (parish A)
