= FK Brezno =

Slovak football club

- Founded: 1913; 113 years ago
- Stadium: Mestský štadión Brezno, Brezno, Slovakia
- Capacity: 3,000
- Head Coach: Marián Strelec
- League: 6. Liga
- Website: www.fkbrezno.sk

FK Brezno (also referred to as simply Brezno) is a Slovak football club based in the city of Brezno, that currently plays in the 6. Liga, the sixth highest level in the country. The team is currently coached by former Czechoslovak represent Marián Strelec. The club currently plays its home matches in the Mestský štadión Brezno, which they also occasionally share with first league club FK Železiarne Podbrezová.

== History ==
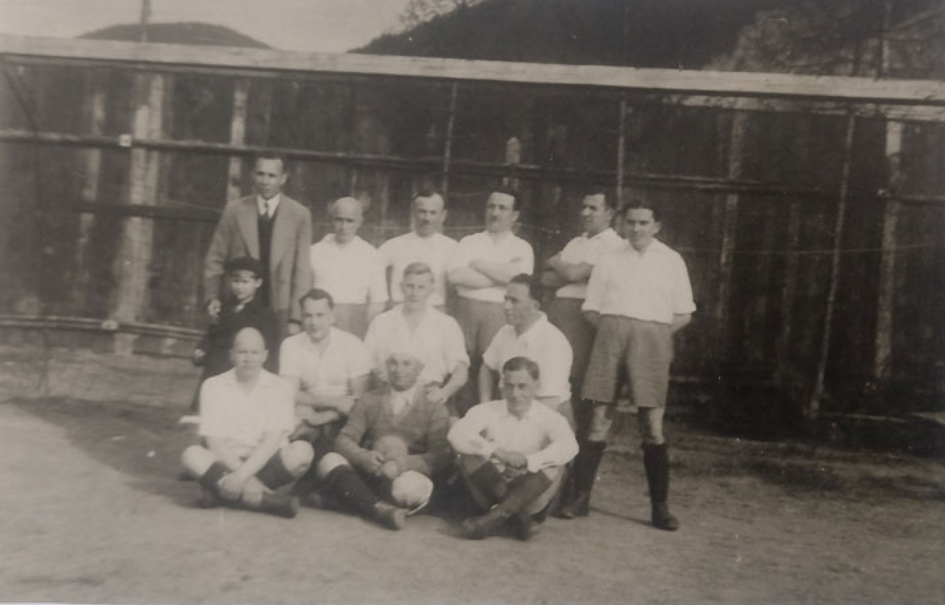
FK Brezno players in 1913.

=== 1913–1925: Founding and early years ===
From the end of the 19th century and the beginning of the 20th century, football was established in Brezno. The first club was founded by a group of students from Banská Bystrica. It was in June 1913 that the BSE sports club – Breznobánya Sport Egylet (sports club Banské Brezno) had been founded in Horehroní. At the outset, it had 70 regular members and 36 supporting members. A six-member committee was established, and its chairman was Dr. Ján Bruoth. Until 1922, the city square was where the pitch was located, later on the parish meadows behind the station. The field was not constructed until 1925, and it was opened with ceremony in July of that year. This was with a friendly match against Slavia Banská Bystrica, in which FK Brezno would win 1–0.

=== 1945–1970: Post-war years ===
After World War II, FK Brezno's football activity would resume. Local students played for the team. Vojtech Zachar was the coach, who went on to become a member of the Czechoslovak national team after moving to Žilina. The Brezno team returned to playing in the first regional league between 1963 and 1964, represented by soldiers who had completed their basic military training. In the 1966/67 season, the club achieved 4th place, being promoted to the first league in central Slovakia, where they finished in 1st spot. The increase in Brezno football's level was confirmed by the results, as evidenced by another promotion to the regional championship. It was the second promotion in two years.

=== 1970–1981: Golden years and fall ===
The Brezno team opened the 1970/71 season with a home match against Dukla Prešov, which they won 1–0 after a goal scored by Ľubomir Vaník. The Brezno team secured third place in the autumn with 15 points after a series of wins and losses. The club secured 1st place following a win against Podbrezová. It was the club's fourth promotion in 5 years. The first match was played in Liptovský Mikuláš, where lost 2–0. In the first home match in front of a full stadium Brezno won 2–0. In the first season playing in the Slovak National League, the Brezno team took 11th place when out of 26 matches they won 10, drew 4 and lost 12. In 1975, the Brezno team was coached by Anton Švajlen. After the end of the autumn, the club was in 5th place. However, following poor form in the spring part, the club found themselves on the relegation spot. However, due to the reorganization of the competition, Brezno remained in the SNL. Until 1981, Brezno played in the SNL. The main problem for the club was the frequent departure of players for studies and military service. Therefore, relegation to a lower competition followed.

=== 2006–2016: Revival of FK Brezno ===
In 2006, following financial trouble, football in Brezno ceased to exist and was merged with Železiarne Podbrezová. For 10 years, the city of Brezno was not represented in football. In 2016, the city management succeeded to re-establish the club. The club's first match was against Slovenská Ľupča, where Brezno won 4–1 in front of 1,400 spectators. That year, the club also registered a youth team. The first two years were not successful, but in the 3rd year the club managed to get promoted to the 5. Liga.

=== 2016–present: Recent years ===
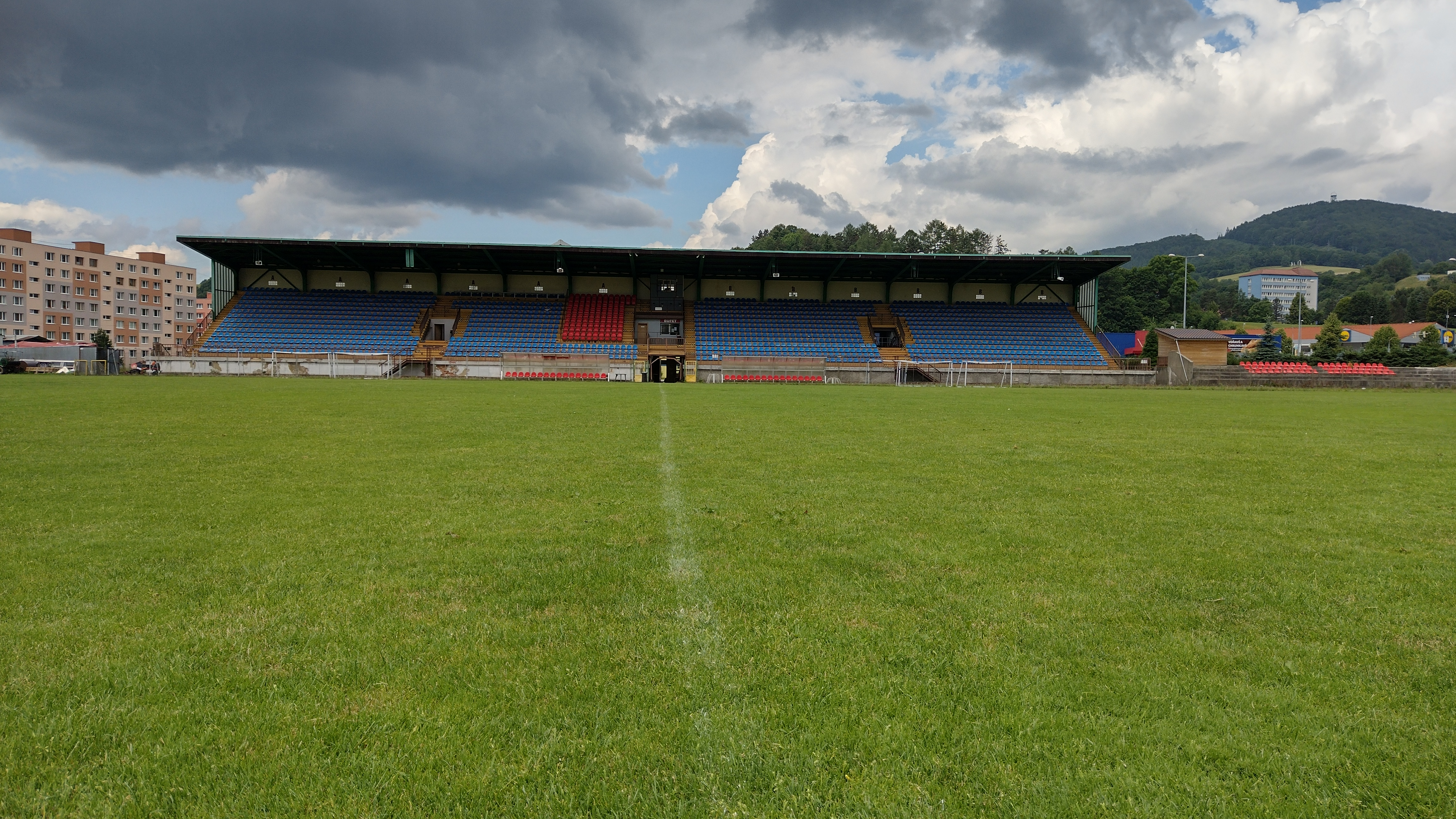
The Mestský štadión in 2023.

In 2022, FK Brezno established all sectors in the youth categories, having over 120 children in their academy. Training conditions had also improved, officially opened a new training pitch measuring 105 m x 68 m with artificial grass. The construction of the football pitch was financed from its own resources. The Slovak Football Association supported the project with 500 thousand euros. In October 2022, Brezno beat 3. Liga side, FK Podkonice 2–1, where they advance to the next stage, being drawn with second division side, MŠK Púchov. They lost the game 3–1 in front of 700 fans, remaining as the lowest league club to have reached the fourth round. In 2025, FK Brezno announced their plans to build a new stadium. It is supposed to finish its construction in 2026 and will be shared with first league side FK Železiarne Podbrezová.

== Rivalries ==
Brezno shares a rivalry with neighboring club TJ Partizán Osrblie. They also hold a derby with FK 09 Bacúch.
