= Dobroč =

Dobroč Dabar
- Municipality
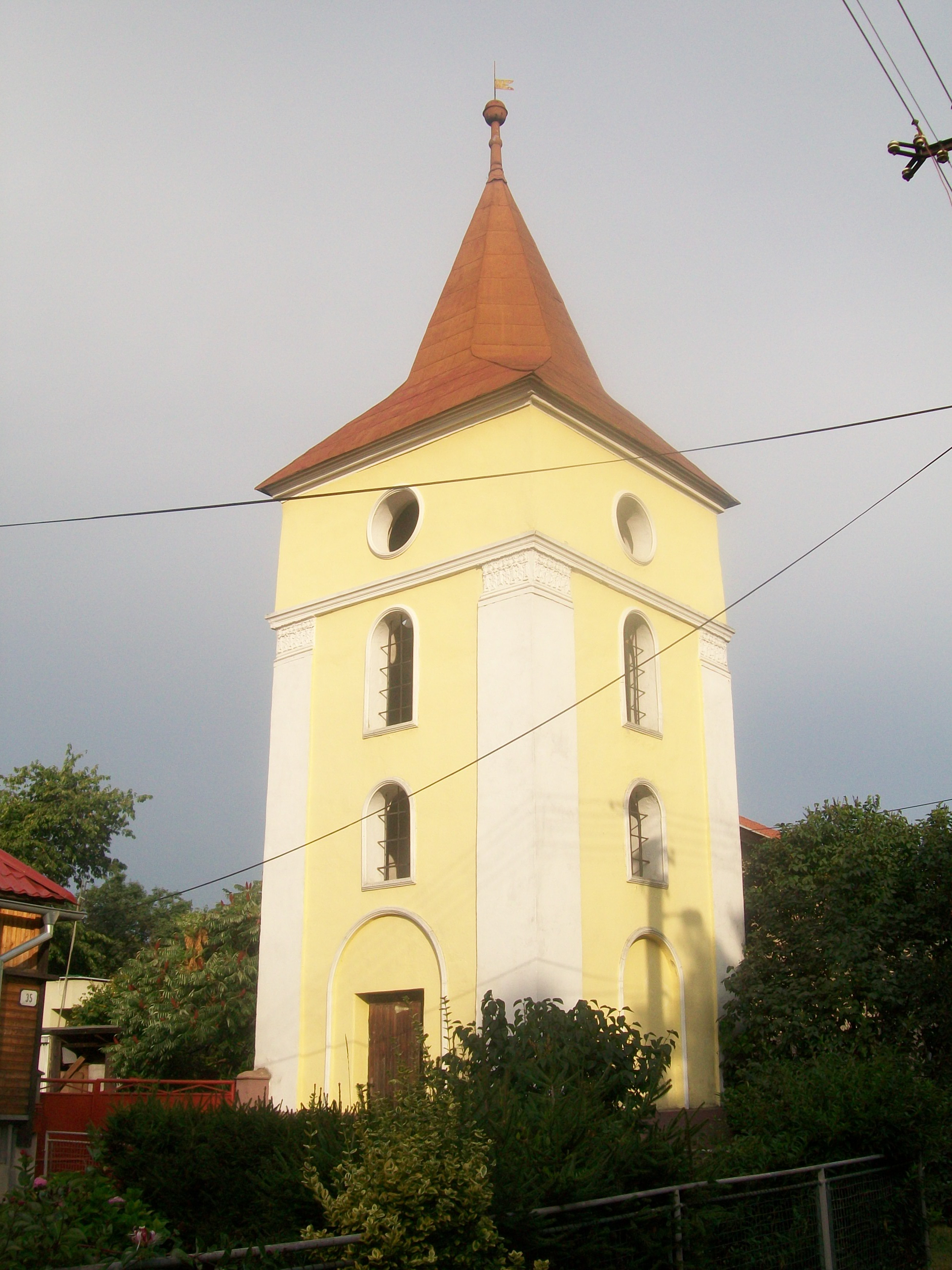
- Belfry in the village Dobroč

- Flag

- Location of Dobroč in the Banská Bystrica Region Location of Dobroč in Slovakia
- Coordinates: 48.48°N 19.57°E
- Country: Slovakia
- Region: Banská Bystrica Region
- District: Lučenec District
- First mentioned: 1393

Area
  - Total: 18.87 km^{2} (7.29 sq mi)
- Elevation: 654 m (2,146 ft)

Population (2025)
  - Total: 595
- Time zone: UTC+1 (CET)
  - Summer (DST): UTC+2 (CEST)
- Postal code: 985 53
- Area code: +421 47
- Vehicle registration plate (until 2022): LC
- Website: www.dobroc.sk

Dobroč (Hungarian: Dabar) is a village and municipality in the Lučenec District in the Banská Bystrica Region of Slovakia.

== Geography ==
The municipality lies at an altitude of 654 metres (2,146 ft) and covers an area of 18.87 km^{2} (7.29 sq mi) (2025).

== History ==
In historical records, the village was first mentioned in 1393 (Dobrocha) as belonging to Divín castle.

== Population ==
Population statistic (10 years)
Year	1995	2005	2015	2025
Count	713	676	634	595
Difference		−5.18%	−6.21%	−6.15%

Population statistic
Year	2024	2025
Count	598	595
Difference		−0.50%

It has a population of 595 people (31 December 2025).

=== Ethnicity ===
Census 2021 (1+ %)
Ethnicity	Number	Fraction
Slovak	579	97.14%
Not found out	14	2.34%
Total	596	

In year 2021 was 596 people by ethnicity 579 as Slovak, 14 as Not found out, 4 as Hungarian, 2 as Czech, 2 as Polish and 1 as Italian.

Note on population: The difference values of population numbers in the table "Population statistic" and in the sections "Ethnicity" & "Religion" is caused by the use of various statistical methods.

=== Religion ===
Census 2021 (1+ %)
Religion	Number	Fraction
Evangelical Church	300	50.34%
Roman Catholic Church	184	30.87%
None	85	14.26%
Not found out	17	2.85%
Total	596	

In year 2021 was 596 people by religion 300 from Evangelical Church, 184 from Roman Catholic Church, 85 from None, 17 from Not found out, 4 from Jehovah's Witnesses, 2 from Christian Congregations in Slovakia, 2 from Greek Catholic Church, 1 from Paganism and natural spirituality and 1 from Ad hoc movements.

== Genealogical resources ==
The records for genealogical research are available at the state archive "Statny Archiv in Banska Bystrica, Slovakia"

- Roman Catholic church records (births/marriages/deaths): 1688-1895 (parish B)
- Lutheran church records (births/marriages/deaths): 1806-1896 (parish B)

== See also ==
- List of municipalities and towns in Slovakia
