= Brezno =

- city
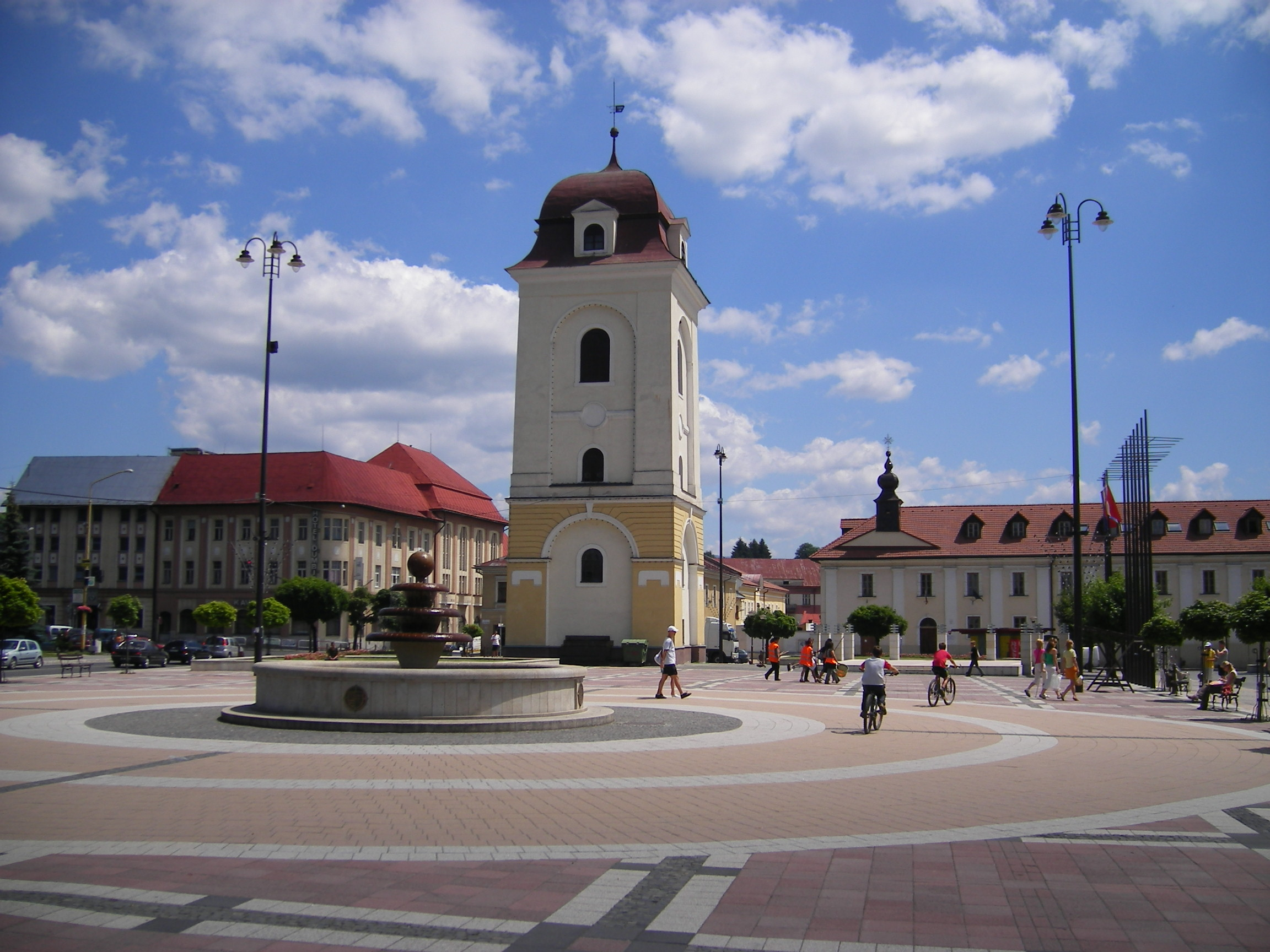
- City center of Brezno

- Flag Coat of arms

- Location of Brezno in the Banská Bystrica Region Brezno (Slovakia)
- Coordinates: 48°48′14″N 19°38′37″E
- Country: Slovakia
- Region: Banská Bystrica
- District: Brezno
- First mentioned: 1265

Government
  - Mayor: Tomáš Abel

Area
  - Total: 121.96 km^{2} (47.09 sq mi)
- (2022)
- Elevation: 504 m (1,654 ft)

Population (2025)
  - Total: 19,577
- Time zone: UTC+1 (CET)
  - Summer (DST): UTC+2 (CEST)
- Postal code: 977 01
- Area code: +421 48
- Vehicle registration plate (until 2022): BR
- Website: www.brezno.sk

Brezno (Slovak: [ˈbreznɔ]; 1927–1948: Brezno nad Hronom; German: Bries or Briesen; Hungarian: Breznóbánya) is a town in central Slovakia with a population of around 21,000.

== Etymology ==
The name is derived from the Slovak word "breza" for birch.

== Geography ==
The municipality lies at an altitude of 504 metres (1,654 ft) and covers an area of 121.96 km^{2} (47.09 sq mi) (2025).

Brezno is located within the Horehronské podolie basin. Brezno lies between the Low Tatras mountain range and the Slovak Ore Mountains, both of which belong to the Inner Western Carpathians. The town is situated on the right bank of the River Hron, which flows through town from the east, in the direction of the city of Banská Bystrica, approximately 45 kilometres (28 miles) west. The local climate in the basin is rather cold, with an annual average of 6.6 °C (43.9 °F) and an annual precipitation of 700–750 mm (28–30 in).

== History ==
The area has been inhabited since prehistoric times, but the current town arose from an old Slovak settlement, next to which newly arrived German miners erected a typical market square in the early 13th century. The first written evidence of the town's existence is dated 1265 when King Béla IV of Hungary issued a charter for hunters from the area of Liptov, allowing them to use the woods around the settlement known as Berezuno. The name is derived from the Slovak word "breza" for birch. In the nineteenth century Brezno was a typical, almost purely Slovak town and was one of the centers of the Slovak national movement.

After the Second World War the town developed into an industrial center. By far the largest industrial concern was Mostaren Brezno, a construction company which specialized in crane construction for the whole of Central Europe. Mostaren Brezno's restructuring in the early '90s caused high unemployment in the whole region. Since the late '90s, Brezno has built a large retail sector and promoted itself and the whole region as a tourist destination. Sports games and events such as the European Biathlon Cup and golf championships are held regularly.

== Population ==
Historical population
Year	Pop.	±%
1980	17,872	—
1991	22,469	+25.7%
2001	22,875	+1.8%
2005	22,279	−2.6%
2006	22,221	−0.3%
2011	21,894	−1.5%
2012	21,161	−3.3%
2013	21,534	+1.8%
2018	20,953	−2.7%

Population statistic (10 years)
Year	1995	2005	2015	2025
Count	22,988	22,297	21,215	19,577
Difference		−3.00%	−4.85%	−7.72%

Population statistic
Year	2024	2025
Count	19,671	19,577
Difference		−0.47%

It has a population of 19,577 people (31 December 2025).

=== Ethnicity ===
Census 2021 (1+ %)
Ethnicity	Number	Fraction
Slovak	18,643	92.93%
Not found out	1254	6.25%
Romani	330	1.64%
Total	20,061	

In year 2021 was 20,061 people by ethnicity 18,643 as Slovak, 1254 as Not found out, 330 as Romani, 142 as Czech, 50 as Hungarian, 42 as Other, 25 as Vietnamese, 25 as Russian, 19 as Rusyn, 19 as German, 19 as Moravian, 16 as Polish, 11 as Ukrainian, 7 as Jewish, 7 as Italian, 6 as Chinese, 6 as Serbian, 3 as French, 2 as Greek, 1 as Irish, 1 as Romanian, 1 as Austrian, 1 as Bulgarian, 1 as English and 1 as Albanian.

Note on population: The difference values of population numbers in the table "Population statistic" and in the sections "Ethnicity" & "Religion" is caused by the use of various statistical methods.

=== Religion ===
Census 2021 (1+ %)
Religion	Number	Fraction
Roman Catholic Church	10,002	49.86%
None	6275	31.28%
Not found out	1906	9.5%
Evangelical Church	1132	5.64%
Greek Catholic Church	241	1.2%
Total	20,061	

In year 2021 was 20,061 people by religion 10,002 from Roman Catholic Church, 6275 from None, 1906 from Not found out, 1132 from Evangelical Church, 241 from Greek Catholic Church, 84 from Other and not ascertained christian church, 76 from Christian Congregations in Slovakia, 66 from Jehovah's Witnesses, 66 from Ad hoc movements, 61 from Other, 31 from Paganism and natural spirituality, 26 from Eastern Orthodox Church, 20 from Calvinist Church, 14 from Seventh-day Adventist Church, 12 from Buddhism, 10 from United Methodist Church, 8 from Baptists Church, 7 from Apostolic Church, 5 from Bahá'i Community, 4 from Old Catholic Church, 4 from Islam, 4 from Hinduism, 3 from Church of the Brethren, 2 from Czechoslovak Hussite Church, 1 from Jewish community and 1 from Church of Jesus Christ of Latter-day Saints.

== Sports ==
The town's three sports clubs with the highest attendance are HC Brezno, FC Brezno and Biathlon Club Brezno. Other sports clubs include Volleyball Club Brezno, Cycle Club Brezno, and Swim Club Brezno. The city is also represented in football by FK Brezno, which currently plays in the 6. Liga.

The hockey club HC Brezno represents the town as part of the 1st senior league since the 2009/10 season. Therefore, the Brezno town council decided to reconstruct it's indoor stadium in 2009. During the reconstruction, new seats were added and the stadium was renamed the Brezno Arena; total capacity was increased to 2,500 seats.

== Notable people ==
- Ivan Bella, cosmonaut
- Ján Chalupka, writer
- Pavol Habera, singer
- Ottó Herman, ornithologist
- Jozef Karika, experimental writer and publicist
- Karol Kuzmány, writer
- Miroslav Leitner, ski mountaineer
- Martin Rázus, writer
- Petr Sepéši, singer
- Adriana Sklenaříková, fashion model
- Dušan Švantner, politician
- Marián Strelec, footballer

== Twin towns – sister cities ==
Brezno is twinned with:

- Ciechanów, Poland
- Čačak, Serbia
- Meudon, France
- Nădlac, Romania
- Nový Bydžov, Czech Republic

== Gallery ==
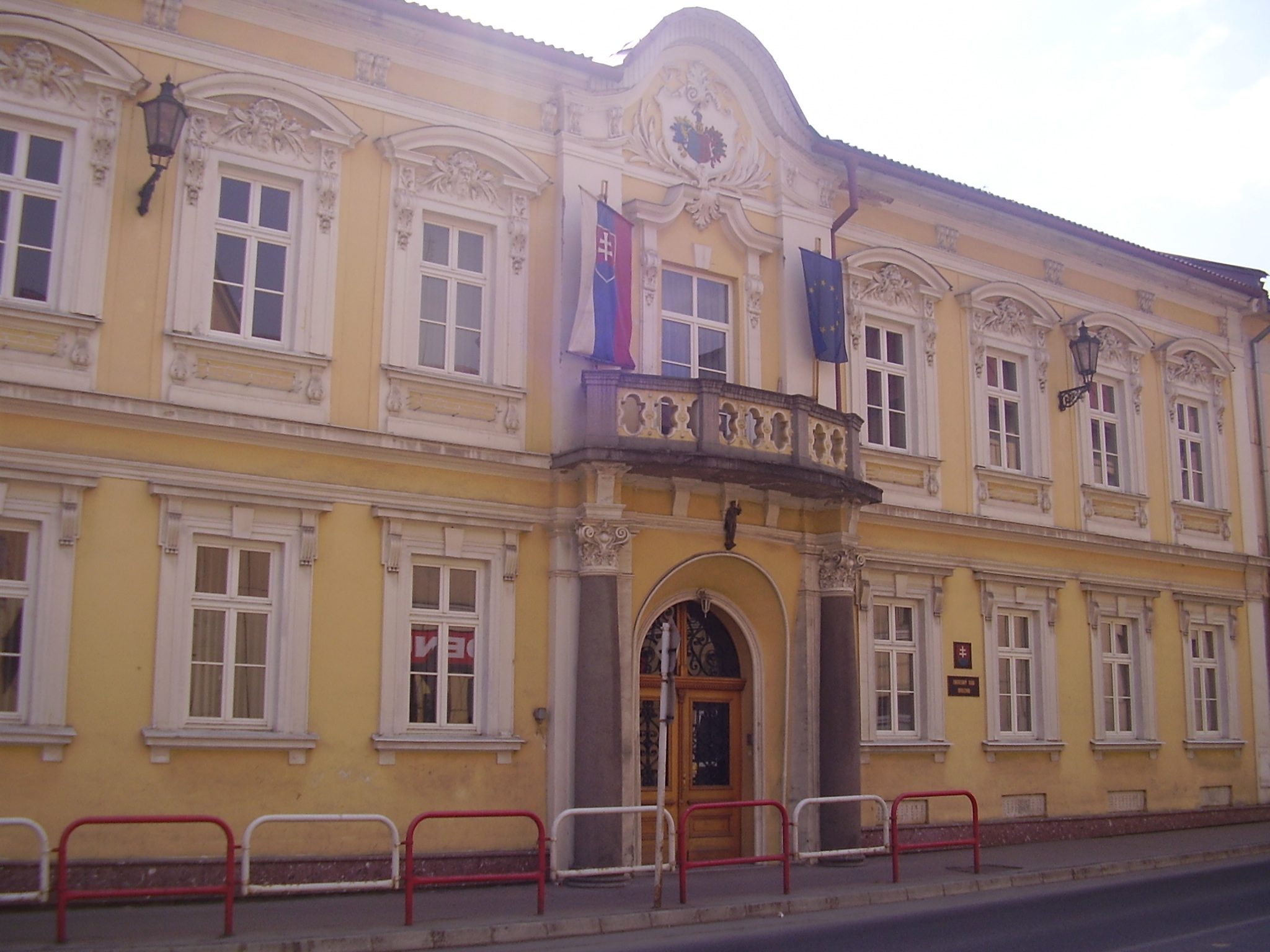
Courthouse

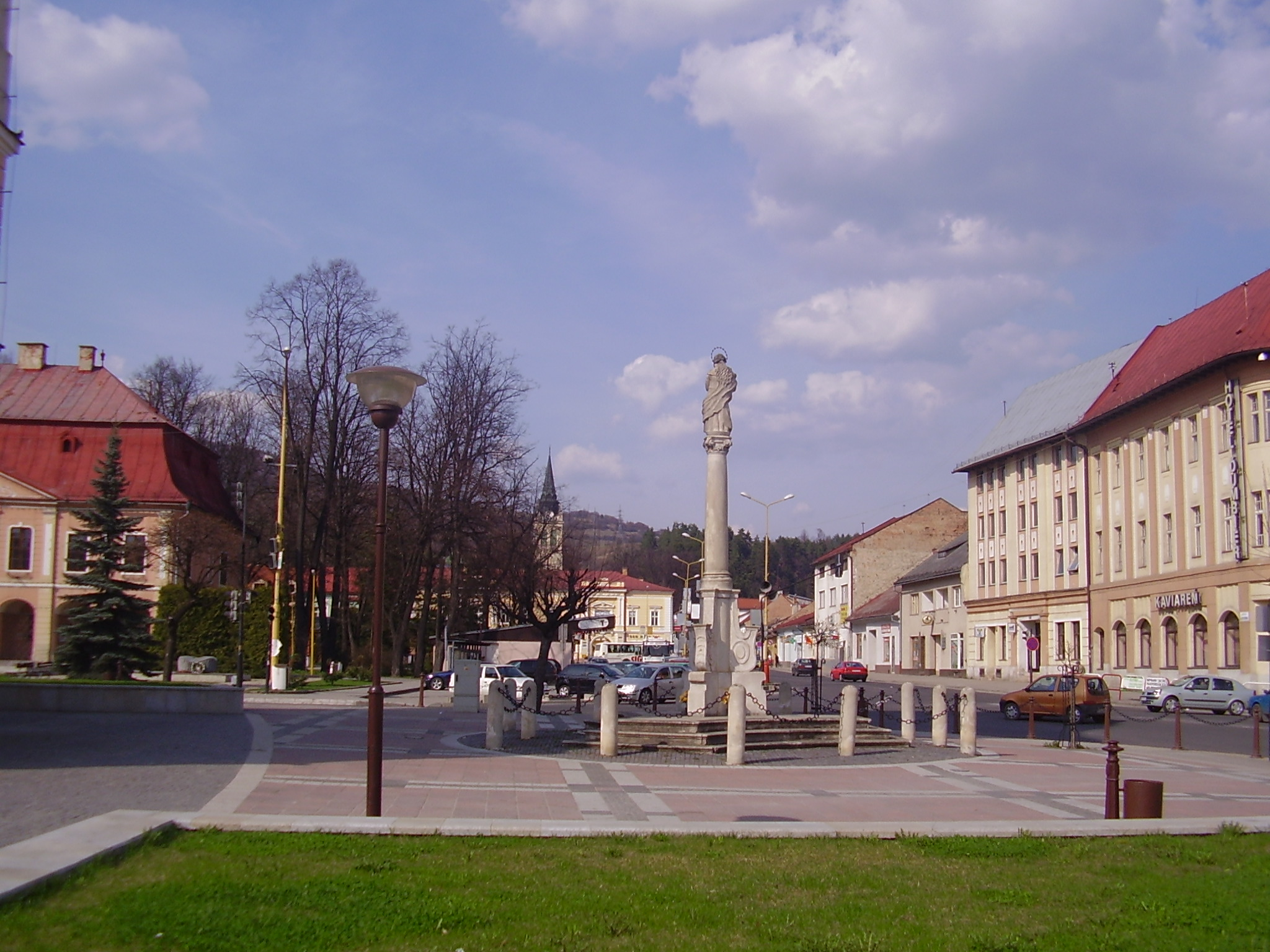
Plague column

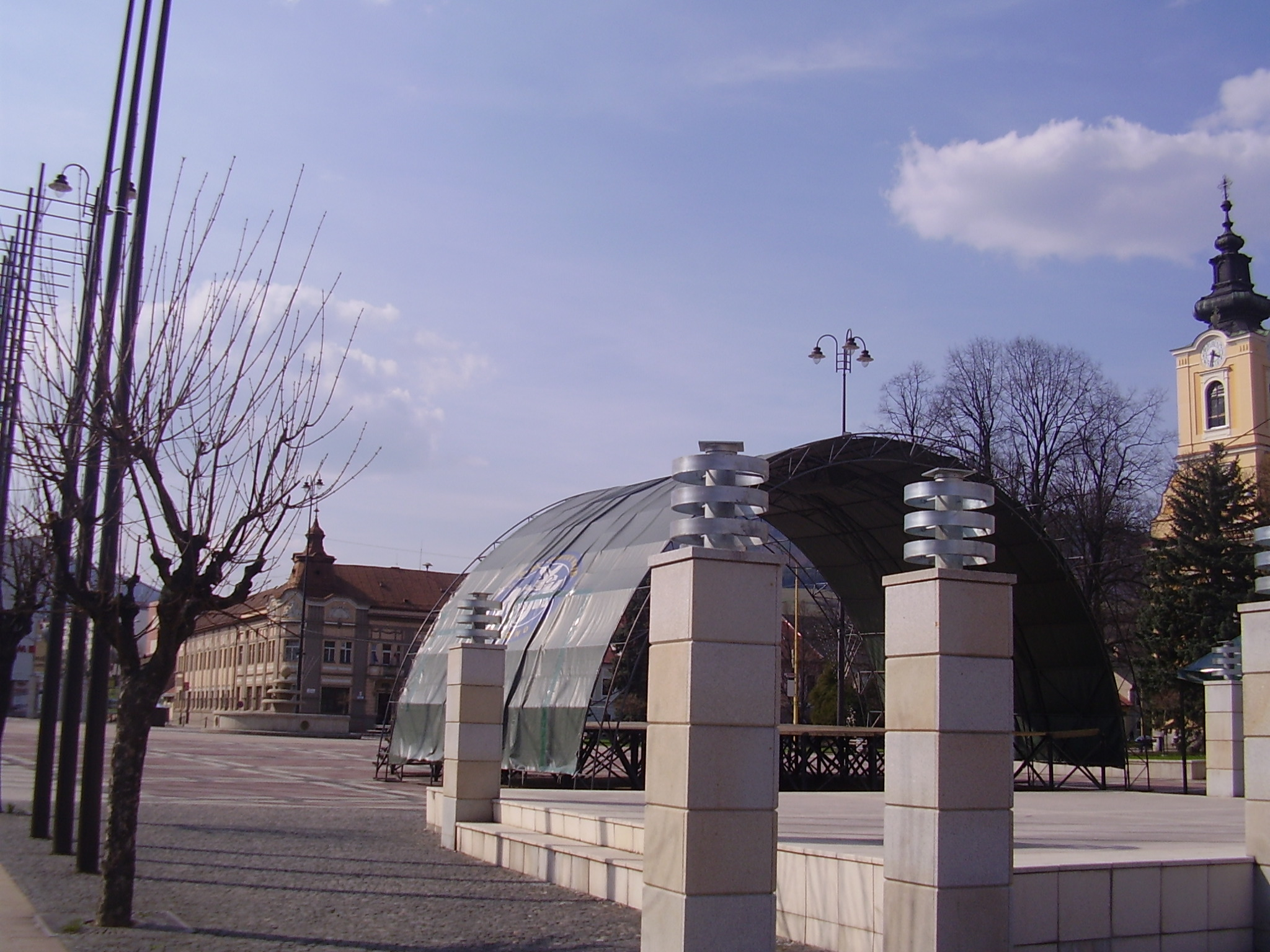
Modern architecture

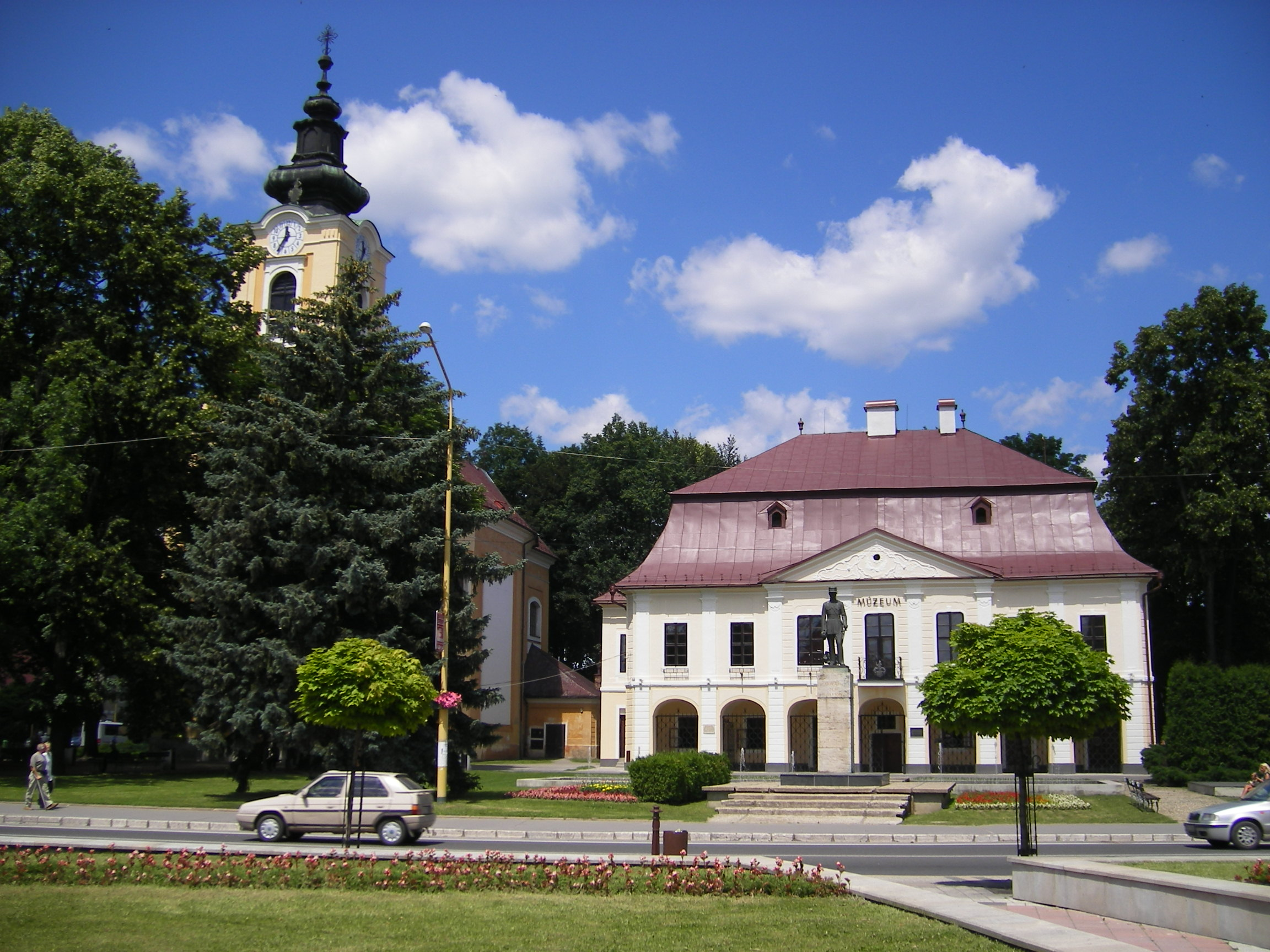
Catholic church and town museum

== See also ==
- List of municipalities and towns in Slovakia

== Genealogical resources ==
The records for genealogical research are available at the state archive "Státný Archiv in Banská Bystrica, Slovakia"

- Roman Catholic church records (births/marriages/deaths): 1656-1904 (parish A)
- Lutheran church records (births/marriages/deaths): 1784-1896 (parish A)
