= Bechyně (disambiguation) =

Bechyně is a town in the Czech Republic.

Bechyně may also refer to:

- Bechyně Bridge, Czech Republic
- Jan Bechyně (1920–1973), Czech entomologist
- Josef Bechyně (1880–?), Czech wrestler
