= Tábor–Bechyně railway =

First electrified railway in the Czech Republic

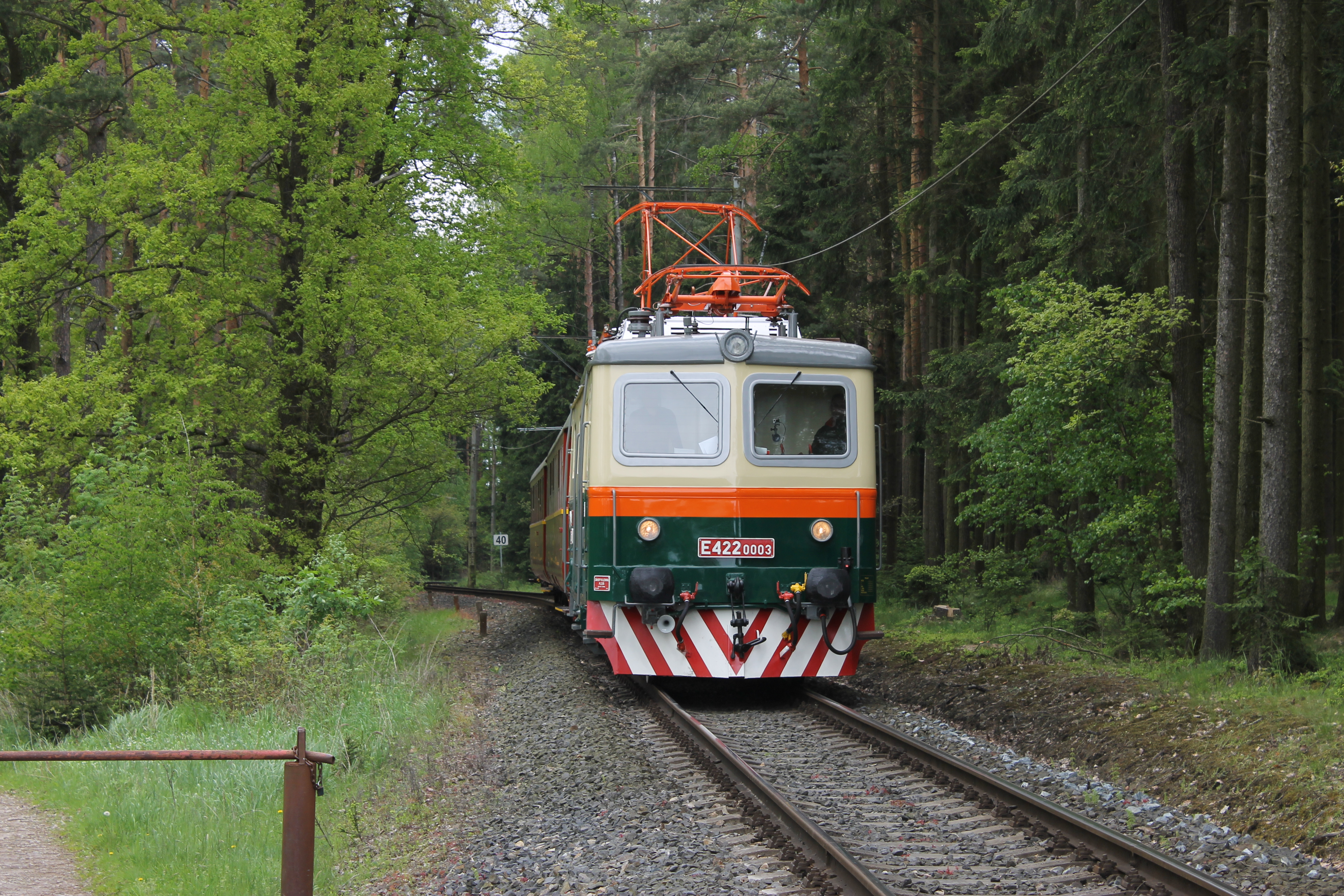
- A ČD 100 class locomotive at Bežerovice

Overview
- Status: open
- Owner: Správa železniční dopravní cesty
- Termini: Tábor; Bechyně
- Stations: 13

Service
- Route number: 202
- Operator(s): České dráhy
- Rolling stock: ČD Class 814; ČD Class 113; ČD Class 100 kkStB 40.0

History
- Opened: 21 June 1903

Technical
- Line length: 24 km (15 mi)
- Track gauge: 1,435 mm (4 ft 8 1/2 in) standard gauge
- Electrification: 1500V DC
- Operating speed: 60 kilometres per hour (37 mph)

The Tábor–Bechyně railway was the first electrified railway line in the Czech Republic, opening in 1903.

== History ==
The proposal for construction of the line was submitted to the Czech Diet in 1896.

In 2020, it was announced that the line would be converted to the standard 25 kV at 50 Hz.

== Service ==
The line also has regular heritage services: On summer weekends Bobinka locomotives are used every two hours, with the original EMUs operating on selected dates.

== See also ==
- Bechyně Bridge, a Czech national cultural monument which carries the line over the Lužnice river
