= Pillivuyt =

Ceramics manufacture, 19th century, Berry, France

Coordinates: 47°08′25″N 2°12′47″E

- Pillivuyt motto

- Ceramic plate, ca 1880
- Type: Firm
- Industry: Ceramic
- Founded: 1818
- Founder: Jean Louis Richard Pillivuyt
- Headquarters: Mehun-sur-Yèvre, France
- Area served: Europe, USA
- Key people: Pillivuyt family
- Products: Earthenware, porcelain
- Owner: Nathalie Beaucher, Claire Calvarin
- Number of employees: 200 (2023)
- Website: pillivuyt.com

Pillivuyt is a French company specialised in porcelains and tableware. It has been created in 1818 by Jean Louis Richard Pillivuyt in the commune of Mehun-sur-Yèvre, in the Cher department.

The company was awarded the Living Heritage Company label (French: Entreprise du Patrimoine Vivant) in 2009. This award, issued under the authority of the Ministry of the Economy and Finance, aims to distinguish French companies displaying an artisanal and industrial expertise of excellent standard.

== History ==
=== From Switzerland to France ===
Jean Louis Richard Pillivuyt was born in 1774 in Yverdon-les-Bains, in the canton of Vaud, Switzerland. His parents were Christine Niderest and Louis Ferdinand Pillivuyt. He moved to Paris in 1796 to establish a bank, in rue Saint-Marc.

A year later, he married Rose Anne Louise Berthout van Berchem on 19 May, in Gressy, France. Anne Louise was the widow of Antoine Louis Henri de Polier, a Swiss officer, engineer and explorer, who was assassinated in Avignon in 1795, during the terror years that followed the French Revolution.

She died in 1804. Two years later, Jean Louis Richard espoused Louise Salomé Lisette Hermann (1784-1866).

In 1818, the family (Jean Louis, Louise and two sons) moved to the Cher department, in the city of Foëcy. There, Benjamin Klein, a Swiss citizen, had established a porcelain manufacture in 1799, in the annex building of the castle. Jean-Louis Richard bought the company and associate to its capital Dominique André, a Parisian banker and his son Louis André.

The manufacture started to grow in the 1820s. Jean Louis Richard Pillivuyt was given the French citizenship in 1825 by Charles X of France. In 1830, Jean Louis Richard Pillivuyt retired, naming his eldest son from his first wedding, Charles-Louis-Maximilien, as his successor. On his side, Louis André brought in his son-in-law, Frédéric Monnier, to succeed him. The new company was rebranded Louis André, Charles Pillivuyt et Compagnie. At the beginning, the ceramic pieces were produced without colors: designs and decoration were performed in Paris. In 1845, these craftsmen relocated to Foëcy.

In 1833, the Pillivuyt family rented the buildings of the nearby Noirlac Abbey, where the owner, a British citizen, had established a porcelain manufactory. The family eventually took over the abbey factory in 1848, integrating it into its other operations in 1854. The workshop at Noirlac operated from 1822 to 1866, and required many adaptative reconstructions of the edifice:

- an intermediate floor was installed in the church;
- porcelain kilns were installed against the northern wall of the side aisle;
- cloister attics were raised and enlarged;
- two wide openings were cut into the cloister's south gallery, which eventually caused the vaults to collapse;
- openings in the cloister gallery were walled up. The cloister itself was raised to build large attics for drying and storing porcelain.

Photographs taken by Jean-Eugène Durand (1845–1926) in 1877, display the scale of the damage in the abbey.

In 1847, Louis André, Charles Pillivuyt et Compagnie opened the first Pillivuyt boutique in Paris, at 46 Rue de Paradis.

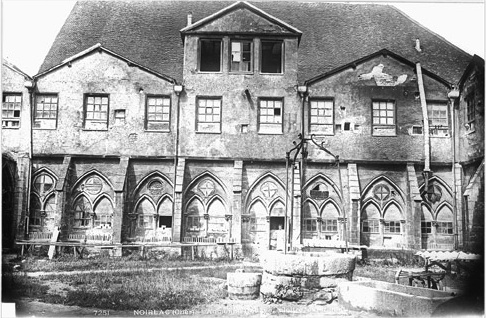
Jean-Eugène Durand , Noirlac - west gallery, 1877

The same year, the firm employed more than 300 people in Foëcy.

Despite the success, the two young directors (Pillivuyt and Monnier) did not get on well together and both went their own way:

- Charles-Louis Pillivuyt purchased a plot of land in Mehun-sur-Yèvre in 1853, to have a new manufacture built;
- Frédéric Monnier kept the plant at Foëcy.

Facing financial difficulties, Monnier hired Albert Pillivuyt, Charles son, as the company director. In 1855, Frédéric Monnier retired and the Foëcy's manufactory was renamed Albert Pillivuyt et Cie or APILCO. In the early 20th century (1909), Albert’s son, Robert, joined the firm and remained there until its final closure. The brand will be bought by Fernand Deshoulières in 1933, keeping till today the ceramics activity at Foëcy.

=== Mehun-sur-Yèvre ===
On 1 October 1854, Charles opened his manufacture in Mehun-sur-Yèvre, a small medieval town near Foëcy. The place was chosen for its proximity to the Berry Canal, the railway network, the forests (production required 10 kilograms (22 lb) to 20 kilograms (44 lb) of wood to bake 1 kilogram (2.2 lb) of ceramic) and the abundant resources of kaolinite in the close area. In 1860, in addition to this plant, one of the largest factories in France (covering 17 hectares (42 acres)), equipped with 6 furnaces and steam engines), Pillivuyt operated two other manufactures in the region, employing a total of 1200.

Coat-of-arm of Mehun-sur-Yèvre

The success of the endeavour allowed the firm to take over a neighbouring porcelain factory in Nevers, Neppel fils et Bonnot, in 1866.

Pillivuyt established a distinctive studio within the factory, the Spéciale, where the most talented craftsmen (such as Eugène Halot or Alphonse Lamarre) could create unique designed porcelain pieces. Thanks to the Spéciale atelier, Pillivuyt won gold medals at a succession of exhibitions: 1855 Paris Exhibition, 1862 London Exhibition, 1867 Universal Exposition, 1878 and 1889 Paris Exhibitions.

Charles Pillivuyt passed away in 1872. He was succeeded by his son, Louis, then only 24 years old, who led the manufactory for 40 years. During his tenure, production was mainly focused on popular, cheap items. The operations were put on hold during WWI, but took off again after the Great Depression years. In 1924, the company employed 800 people, in 1939 only 250.

At the end of WWII, Charles II Pillivuyt was personally ruined by keeping the workshops open throughout the conflict. He was forced to sell the firm which had only 28 employees left.

The new owner, Alfred Simon, was an ancient customer. He succeeded to bring the factory back to life thanks to substantial personal investments and the set up of two giant tunnel kilns.

In the early 1960s, the severe international competition (from Germany or Japan) resulted in the German company, Langenthal Porcelain Factory, to acquire a majority stake in Pillivuyt. The move helped modernising the facility and investing in the future by training new workers and introducing new working methods. In 1988, the firm changed ownership as the Swiss group Laufen entered the capital.

Eventually, the SAS Pillivuyt was reborn in January 2002: among the investors is Bertrand Pillivuyt, Charles II's grandson. Since this relaunch, the company has experienced a period of solid growth, exporting 80% of its production across European and Scandinavian markets, in the United States, in Asia and the Middle East.

The manufacture is one of the last porcelain producer in France to elaborate its own paste. In 2018, Pillivuyt celebrated its 200th anniversary: for the occasion, an exhibition was organized in the Porcelain Museum in Mehun-sur-Yèvre.

Pillivuyt remains, along with companies from Limoges (Bernardaud, Haviland & Co.) or from Drôme (Revol Porcelaine), one of the last French porcelain manufacturers of critical size.

== Family and descendants ==
Jean Louis Richard Pillivuyt married Anne Louise Berthout van Berchem on 19 May 1797. They had a son, Charles Jules Auguste Pillivuyt.

Jean Louis Richard married a second time in 1806 with Louise Hermann. They had a six children, among whom, Charles Louis Maximilien François, who took over the manufacture.

=== Fragmentary family tree ===
- Christine Niderest and Louis Ferdinand Pillivuyt
  - Jean Louis Richard Pillivuyt (1774-1841) married Rose Anne Louise Berthout van Berchem (1768-1804)
    - Charles Jules Auguste Pillivuyt (1799-1856) married Claire Charlotte Elisabeth Hochereau (1802-1882)
      - Adolphe Louis "Jules" Pillivuyt (1835-1907), working in the Orléans railway, then co-director of a weaving mill in Saint-Quentin. He married Herminie Marthe Hamelle (1842-1905)
      - Charlotte Louise" Annette" Pillivuyt (1837-1903), married Paul Cottard (1832-1866), a printer.
  - Jean Louis Richard Pillivuyt (1774-1841) married Louise Salomé "Lisette" Hermann (1784-1866).
    - Charles Louis (Louis II) Maximilien François Pillivuyt (1810-1872) who took over the plant at Foëcy and set up the current manufacture in Mehun-sur-Yèvre. He became mayor of Foëcy in 1850 and of Mehun later. He married Elisabeth Mourgue (1820-1902)
      - Louis Pillivuyt (1849-1928) married Lucie Tattet (1851-1884)
        - Charles II (1876-1963) was the last family owner of the manufacture. He sold the firm after WWII.
      - Albert Pillivuyt (1852-1927) married Léonie Jeanne Anna Lebrat (b. 1864). Albert took over Monnier's plant in Foëcy in the 1850s, rebranding it Albert Pillivuyt et Cie.
        - Madeleine (1883-1981) married Henri Pons (1877-1940), a physician.
          - André (1913-1998), an engineer, who purchased the Barben Castle (French: Chateau de la Barben), near Salon-de-Provence in 1963. In 1971, he established there the Zoo of la Barben.
      - Hélène Pillivuyt (1854-1930) married Alfred Walbaum (1849-1910), co-director of Tissage Walbaum et Cie, a wool spinning and weaving plant in Reims
        - Marc Walbaum (1896-1971), who took over the company. He married Violette Guillierme (1899-1987)
          - Monique Walbaum (1920-1985), married Yvon Morandat (1913-1972), a French trade union leader and member of the French Resistance, who after World War II became active as a Gaullist politician.
      - Eugène Pillivuyt (1857-1912) married Hélèbe Guillierme (1864-1945)
      - Gustave Pillivuyt (1858-1937) married Jeanne Beaujour (1871-1920)
      - Marcel Pillivuyt (1862-1938) married Alice Poupart de Neuflize (1864-1957) coming from a family of bankers.
        - Solange (1890-1986) married Eugène Mirabaud, a banker.
          - Jacqueline Odile Mirabaud (b. 1916) married Christian de Waldner de Freundstein (1908-1990), CEO of IBM France (1952-1960).
        - Anne-Marie Pillivuyt (1896-2002) married Jean Latham (1884-1952)

Robert Pillivuyt, one of the last descendants, has been a General Delegate of the National Federation of Ceramics and Glassware (French: Délégué général de la Fédération Nationale de la Céramique et de la Verrerie), today's Fédération des industries céramiques de France (FICF).

== See also ==
- Mehun-sur-Yèvre
- Bourges
- Ceramic
- Noirlac Abbey
- Antoine Polier
- Yvon Morandat
- Jean de Neuflize

== Bibliography ==
- Letourneau, Henri (1995). L'industrie de la porcelaine en Berry et régions voisines. Essai de géographie historique [The porcelain industry in Berry and neighboring regions. An essay in historical geography.] (in French). Poitiers: Norois. pp. 535–548.
- Beauvais, Jean-Louis (1995). L'Implantation et développement de l'industrie porcelainière dans le Cher au XIXe siècle : la famille Pillivuyt [Establishment and development of the porcelain industry in the Cher department during the 19th century: the Pillivuyt family.] (in French). Rennes: MemHOuest.
