= ČSD Class E 422.0 =

Czech 1500V DC electric locomotive

ČSD class E 422.0
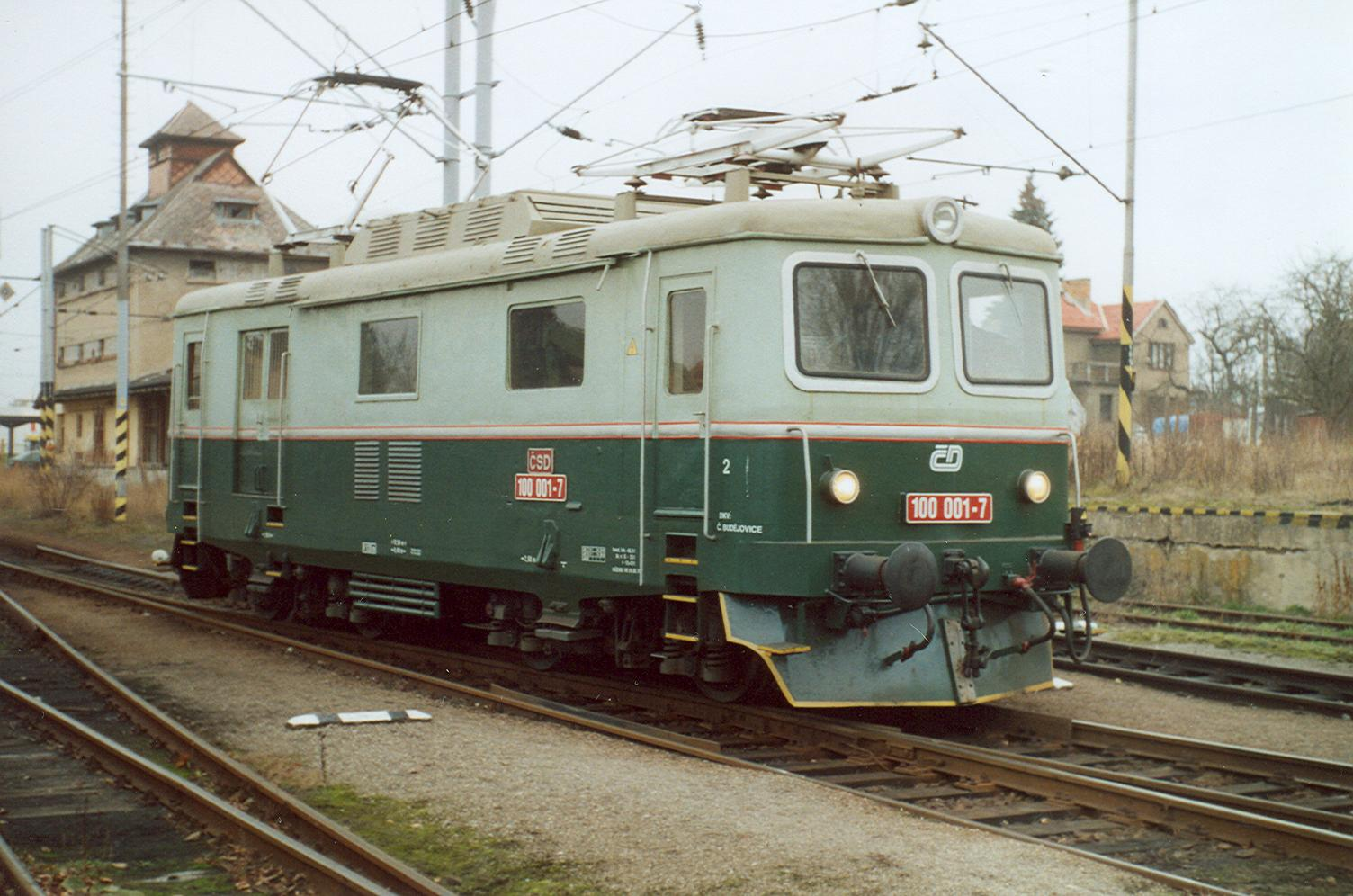
Type and origin
- Power type: Electric
- Builder: Škoda Works
- Build date: 1956 to 1957
- Total produced: 4
Specifications
- Configuration
  - AAR: B-B
  - UIC: Bo´Bo´
- Gauge: 1,435 mm (4 ft 8 1/2 in)
- Length: 12,940 millimetres (509 in)
- Height
  - Pantograph: 4,800 millimetres (190 in)
  - Body height: 4,010 millimetres (158 in)
- Loco weight: 48 tonnes (47 long tons; 53 short tons)
- Electric system/s: 1.5kV DC via overhead wire
Career
- Nicknames: Bobinka
- Delivered: 1957
- Disposition: ČSD, České dráhy

The ČSD class E 422.0 (Class 100 since 1987) is a Czech electric locomotive, intended for secondary lines electrified at 1.5kV DC. The locomotives were produced by Škoda Works in 1956 and 1957 under the designation Škoda 15E.

== History ==
The locomotives were built for the Tábor–Bechyně and Rybník–Lipno nad Vltavou railways, both of which were electrified with non standard 1.5kV DC electrification. The locomotives were delivered to ČSD during early 1957. After approval testing had been carried out, and modifications made, the locomotives entered service in July 1957. They were then used mostly on freight services until 1973, when the new ČSD E 426.0 class locomotives were delivered, cascading the locomotives onto passenger work.

The locomotives started to be withdrawn in 1997, with locomotive 4 being scrapped in 1998, and locomotive 2 being used as a source of spare parts. The last 100 in regular service was locomotive 3, withdrawn in 2002.

=== Preservation ===
Since withdrawal, locomotive 1 and 3 have been kept operational by ČD, and are used occasionally on special journeys, based at Tábor. Locomotive 2 is currently owned by the National Technical Museum, and stored at Chomutov.

== See also ==
- List of České dráhy locomotive classes
