= Bechyně =

Town in the Czech Republic

- Town
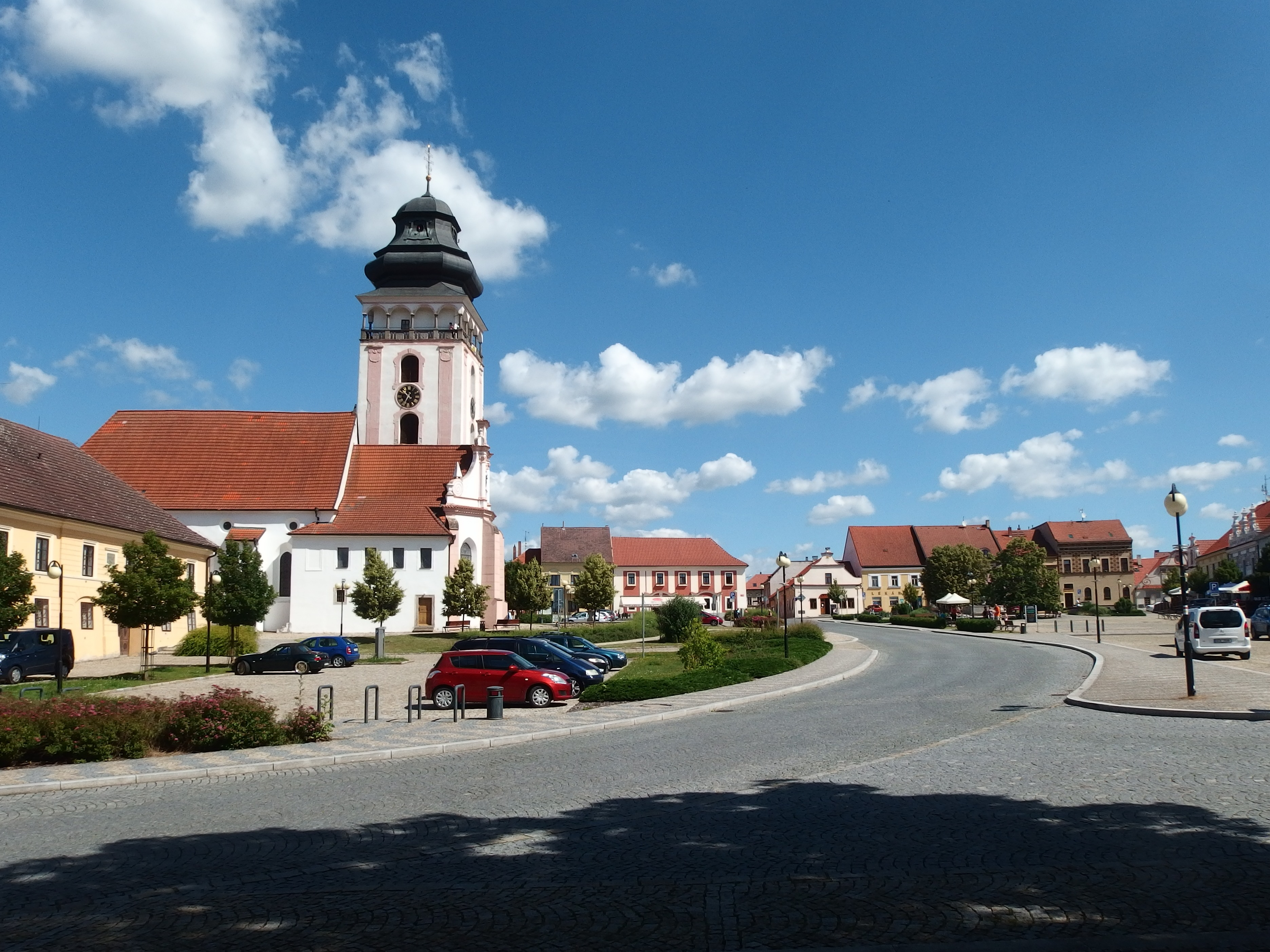
- The square Náměstí T. G. Masaryka with the Church of Saint Matthew

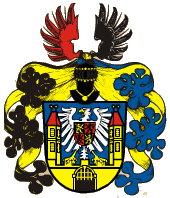
- Flag Coat of arms

- Location in the Czech Republic
- Coordinates: 49°17′50″N 14°28′15″E
- Country: Czech Republic
- Region: South Bohemian
- District: Tábor
- First mentioned: 993

Government
  - Mayor: Štěpán Ondřich

Area
  - Total: 21.29 km^{2} (8.22 sq mi)
- Elevation: 406 m (1,332 ft)

Population (2026-01-01)
  - Total: 4,757
  - Density: 223.4/km^{2} (578.7/sq mi)
- Time zone: UTC+1 (CET)
  - Summer (DST): UTC+2 (CEST)
- Postal code: 391 65
- Website: www.mestobechyne.cz

Bechyně (Czech pronunciation: [ˈbɛxɪɲɛ]; German: Bechin) is a town in Tábor District in the South Bohemian Region of the Czech Republic. It has about 4,800 inhabitants. The town is located at the confluence of the Lužnice and Smutná rivers.

Bechyně is known for its mud spa and its tradition of pottery production, which continues today in the form of sanitary ware production. The historic town centre is well preserved and is protected as an urban monument zone. Among the main landmarks of the town are the Bechyně Castle and the Bechyně Bridge.

== Administrative division ==
Bechyně consists of three municipal parts (in brackets population according to the 2021 census):

- Bechyně (4,670)
- Hvožďany (123)
- Senožaty (77)

== Etymology ==
The name is derived from the Czech personal name Bech, meaning "Bech's".

== Geography ==
Bechyně is located about 19 kilometres (12 mi) southwest of Tábor and 34 km (21 mi) north of České Budějovice. It lies in the Tábor Uplands. The highest point is at 475 m (1,558 ft) above sea level. The town lies on a promontory above the confluence of the Lužnice and Smutná rivers. A brook called Židova strouha also flows into the river in the municipal territory.

== History ==
Footbridge over the Lužnice and the Franciscan monastery, before 1905

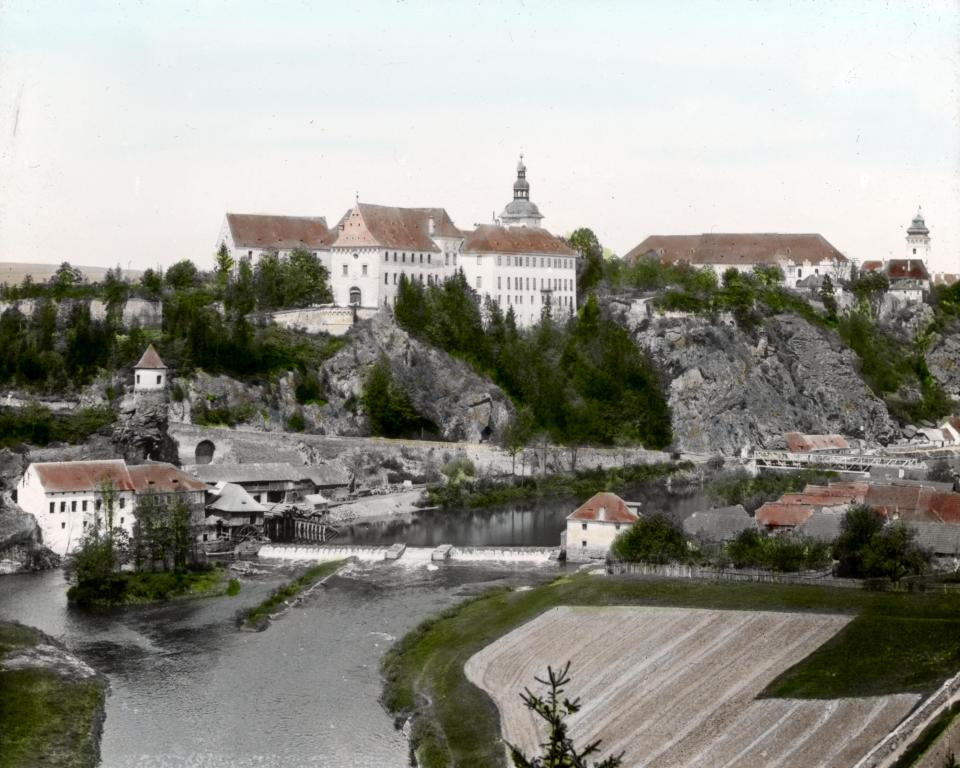
Bechyně in the early 20th century, photographed by Šechtl and Voseček

The area of today's town was settled in the prehistoric era. The oldest evidence of settlement in this area comes from late Bronze Age (c. 1800–1600 BC). In the 8th or 9th century, a Slavic gord was built here.

The first written mention of Bechyně is from around 1120 from Chronica Boemorum, when there was written about settlement of the Bechyně gord in 993. In 1268, Bechyně was bought by King Ottokar II of Bohemia, who decided to have a stone castle built here. In 1323, King John of Bohemia promoted the market village around the castle to a town, redefined its borders and have the fortification built.

In 1422 and then again in 1428, the town was conquered and burned down by the Hussites. From 1340 to 1569, the town was alternately owned by various aristocratic families, including Sternbergs and Schwambergs. In 1569, Bechyně was acquired by Peter Vok of Rosenberg, under whose rule the town experienced a renaissance boom and the reconstruction of the castle. In 1596, Peter Vok sold Bechyně to Adam of Sternberg.

Bechyně was damaged and looted during the Thirty Years' War. The town recovered and grew up to the north. In the 18th century, it developed to a spa town.

The town of Bechyn, Minnesota, was probably established by people from Bechyně who emigrated to the United States to work there.

== Demographics ==
Historical population

Year	Pop.	±%
1869	2,994	—
1880	2,816	−5.9%
1890	2,709	−3.8%
1900	2,714	+0.2%
1910	2,754	+1.5%

Year	Pop.	±%
1921	2,725	−1.1%
1930	2,742	+0.6%
1950	2,746	+0.1%
1961	4,818	+75.5%
1970	5,067	+5.2%

Year	Pop.	±%
1980	5,689	+12.3%
1991	6,151	+8.1%
2001	5,931	−3.6%
2011	5,278	−11.0%
2021	4,870	−7.7%

Source: Censuses

== Economy ==
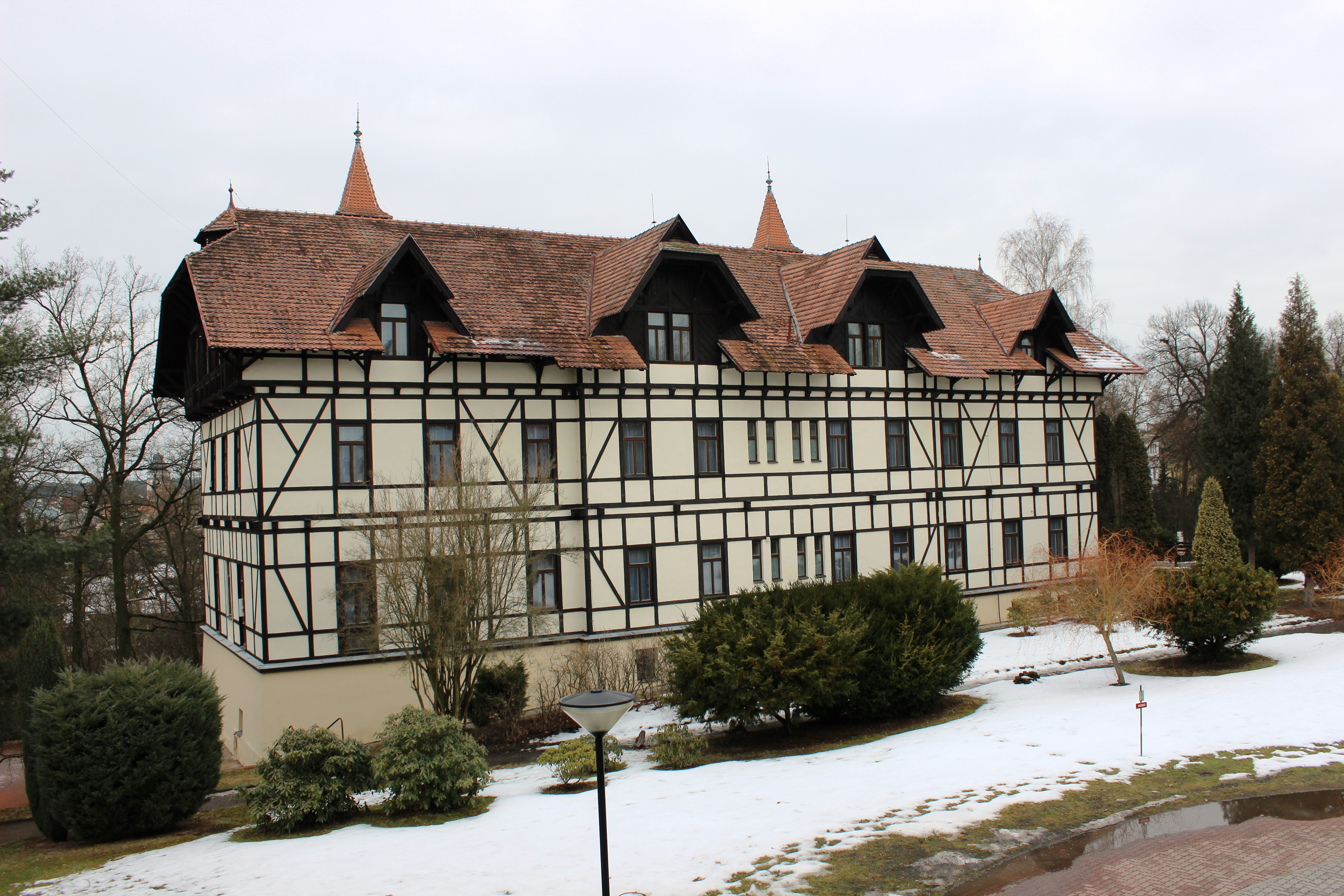
Libuše Spa House

The economy is oriented to services. No major industrial employers have headquarters in Bechyně. However, there is a large production plant of the sanitary ceramic producer Laufen CZ, part of Keramik Holding AG Laufen (today owned by Roca). The factory was established in 1961 and fused into the AG Laufen holding in 1991. The production of sanitary ceramic continues the tradition of ceramic production in the town, which was established in the mid-16th century.

=== Spa ===
Bechyně Spa is one of the oldest spas in the country. The first mention of the healing spring is from 1576, and in 1647, the first spa house was built. In 1727, healing effects were proven by water analysis, and in 1939, healing effects of local peat were also discovered.

Today the spa is specialised in body treatment using therapeutic mud. It treats arthritis and osteoarthritis, ankylosing spondylitis, metabolic diseases affecting the joints, pre-operative and postoperative conditions, neurological disorders and several other diseases.

== Transport ==
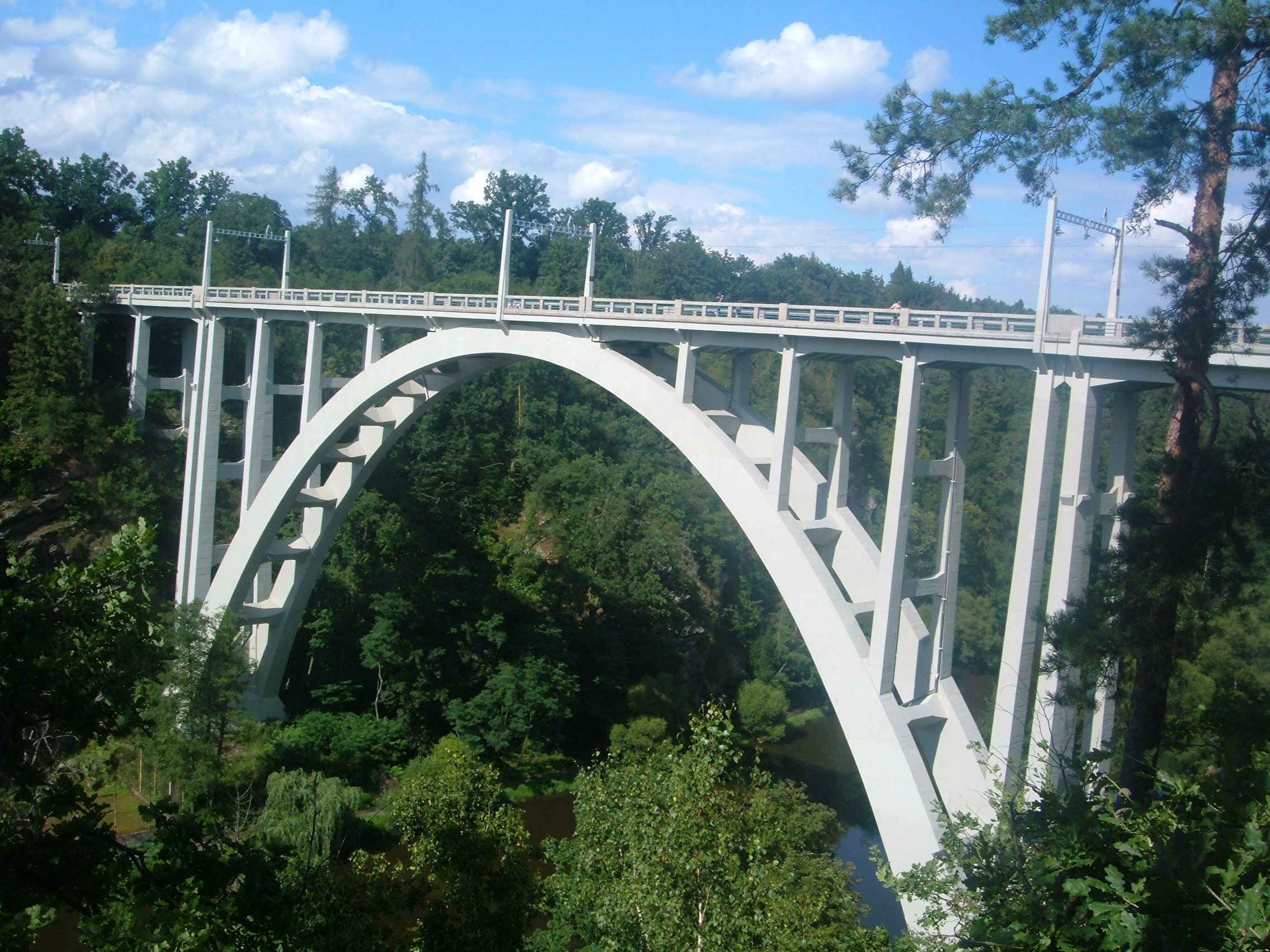
Bechyně Bridge

The town is the terminus of the Tábor–Bechyně railway line. This railway was built in 1903 and was the first electrified railway in the Austria-Hungary. The original passenger train is preserved and operates several times each summer.

On the eastern part of Bechyně is a unique rail and road arch bridge, the Bechyně Bridge.

== Education ==
There is the oldest vocational school of ceramics in Bohemia, which is still functioning. Among its famous student were people like Karel Roden, Karel Kryl and Jan Kačer.

== Sights ==
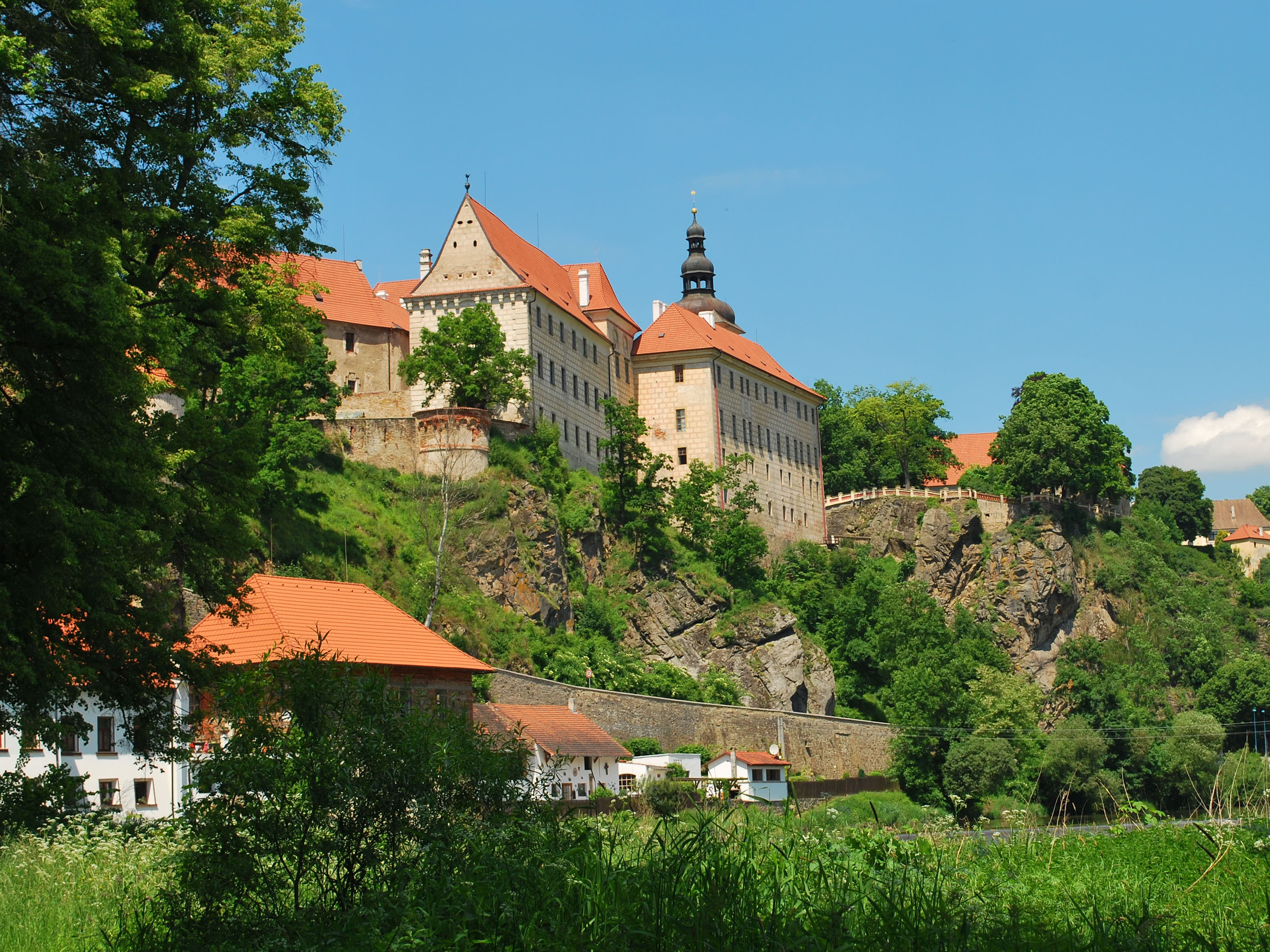
Bechyně Castle on the promontory

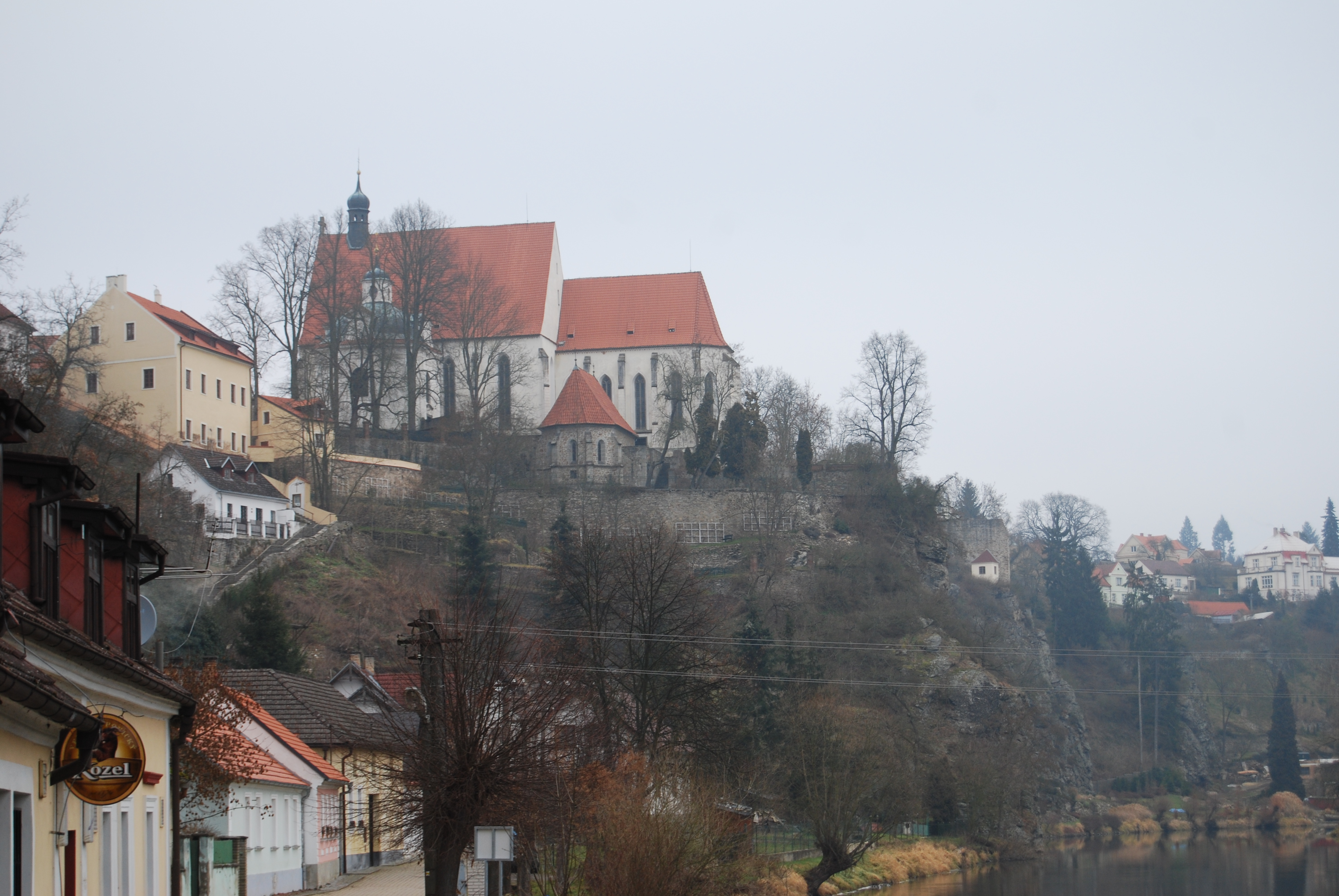
Church of the Assumption of the Virgin Mary

Bechyně Castle is the main historical landmark of the town. The castle was built in the 13th century, although almost none of that original structure remains today. In 1581, Peter Vok of Rosenberg let the late gothic castle rebuilt into a comfortable Renaissance residence with a rich fresco decoration.

Bechyně Monastery was founded in the 15th century and built in the late Gothic style, after the previous monastery was burned down by Hussites in 1422. It is still the property of the Franciscan Order. The monastery complex include the Church of the Assumption of the Virgin Mary and a monastery garden open to the public.

The Church of Saint Matthew is the main landmark of the town square. It was built in the 13th century and rebuilt several times, most notably in the early 17th century. It has preserved interiors from 16th–18th centuries.

The Church of Saint Michael is an early Baroque cemetery church from 1670. Today it serves cultural purposes.

The Firefighter Museum is the oldest museum of its kind in Bohemia. It presents exponates up to 400 years old. The International Museum of Ceramics is located in the former brewery and in the adjacent castle bastions. It follows the history of the industry in Bechyně and includes exhibitions of artists from around the world. The Tourism Museum is located in the former synagogue and reflect tradition of tourism in the Czech Republic and activities of the Czech Tourist Club. In the castle complex there is the Vladimír Preclík Museum with works of this sculptor. In the town centre, there is the Town Museum Bechyně, which presents history of the town.

== Notable people ==
- Václav Pichl (1741–1805), classical composer
- Ladislav Haškovec (1866–1944), neuropsychiatrist
- Josefina Napravilová (1914–2014), humanitarian worker; lived in Bechyně at the end of her life
- Miroslav Kalousek (born 1960), politician, former Finance Minister; lives here

== Twin towns – sister cities ==
Bechyně is twinned with:

- Heřmanův Městec, Czech Republic
