= Noirlac Abbey =

Cistercian Abbey, 12th century, France

- Abbaye de Noirlac
- Eastern facade
- Interactive map of Noirlac Abbey

Monastery information
- Order: Cistercians
- Denomination: Catholic Church
- Established: 1136
- Disestablished: 1791
- Mother house: Clairvaux Abbey
- Dedicated: 27 October 1136

Architecture
- Heritage designation: Monument historique
- Designated date: 1862
- Style: Romanesque, Gothic and Cistercian architectures
- Groundbreaking: Mid-12th century
- Completed date: 14th century
- Closed: 1791

Site
- Location: Bruère-Allichamps, Berry
- Country: France
- Coordinates: 46°44′43″N 2°27′40″E
- Public access: Yes
- Website: https://www.abbayedenoirlac.fr/

Noirlac Abbey is a former Cistercian abbey located in Bruère-Allichamps, near Saint-Amand-Montrond, in the Cher department. The abbey was officially founded in 1136, but the construction itself by monks coming from Clairvaux Abbey only started in 1150, and stretched out to the 13th century. Following the Hundred Years' War (1337–1453), the monastery influence slowly declined:

- in the 16th century, its activity was affected by the In commendam rule;
- it was severely damaged during The Fronde episode, though a restoration happened in the 18th century;
- sold as a national property during the French Revolution and converted into factory in the 19th century, it was purchased by the Cher department in 1909.

It then briefly housed an orphanage, harboured Spanish Civil War refugees and finally operated as an annex to the hospice located in Saint-Amand-Montrond. Interestingly enough, these various fates contributed to the preservation of the abbey buildings.

It is one of the best-preserved Cistercian abbeys in the country; the Cher department restored it between 1950 and 1980. The ensemble currently serves as a "Cultural Meeting Centre" (French: Centre culturel de rencontre), a member of a European network of Cultural Meeting Centres. Furthermore, Noirlac Abbey is a member of the European Charter of Cistercian Abbeys and Sites.

The site has been registered on the National Heritage list in 1862.

== History ==
=== Foundation ===
The abbey was founded in 1136 by a small group of monks from Clairvaux Abbey in Burgundy. It was originally named Maison-Dieu (English: God-house), changing to Noirlac (after the pond bordering the site) in 1290. It is an emblematic monastery of the Cistercian Order In his work (Exordium magnum Ordinis Cisterciensis), the Cistercian monk Conrad of Eberbach reported the founding date of Noirlac as 27 October 1136. The first community was led by Robert de Châtillon-sur-Allier.

The monks occupied lands belonging to the lord Ebbes V of Charenton. It was an inhospitable, marshy, wooded area near the Cher river. A letter dated 1149, sent by Saint Bernard to Suger (abbot of the Basilica of Saint-Denis and advisor to king Louis VII of France), alerts the latter to the precarious situation of the Cistercian community at Maison-Dieu-sur-Cher and requires his assistance:

Our brothers at Maison-Dieu, in the diocese of Bourges, are in need of bread; we have heard that the Lord King's harvest in that region is plentiful and is selling at a low price. We ask you to grant them, from this harvest, whatever amount your wisdom deems appropriate, for my lord the King was accustomed to showing them kindness when he was in the area.

An initial founding charter was issued in 1150 by Ebbes V of Charenton. He granted all the seigneurial rights he held at the site known as La Maison-Dieu, along with a portion of woodland, a stretch of water extending from Humbert's mills to the abbey, and lands at Chalais, Saint-Loup, and Fleuret. This donation was made to the monks of Clairvaux ad abbatiam faciendam (English: for the purpose of establishing an abbey). These rights were transferred from the Benedictine monks of La Celle-Bruère priory near Bruère-Allichamps, who received a compensation.

The donation made by Ebbes V of Charenton was confirmed by his wife Agnès, in 1159, at the request of Pierre de La Châtre, then Archbishop of Bourges and Primate of Aquitaine. The close by Abbey for nuns of Bussières, founded by Agnès and Ebbes V, was soon affiliated with the Abbey of Noirlac. Ebbes VI of Charenton confirmed his father's donations in 1189 and added others at the request of the Archbishop of Bourges, Henry de Sully.

=== Construction and development ===
Cistercian monastery floor plan. (White areas= Monks' quarters/ Gray areas=Lay brothers' quarters) 1.Church, 2.High altar, 3.Side altars, 4.Sacristy, 5.Lavatorium, 6.Matins stair, 7.Upper enclosure, 8.Monks' choir, 9.Bench for the sick, 10.Cloister entrance, 11.Lay brothers' choir, 12.Lay brothers' passage, 13.Courtyard, 14.Book cupboard (armarium), 15.Cloister, 16.Chapter house, 17.Dormitory stair, 18.Monks' dormitory, 19.Latrines, 20.Parlor, 21.Passage, 22.Scriptorium, 23.Novitiate, 24.Warming room (calefactory), 25.Monks' refectory, 26.Reading pulpit, 27.Kitchen, 28.Pantry, 29.Lay brothers' parlor, 30.Lay brothers' refectory, 31.Passage, 32.Storeroom, 33.Staircase, 34.Lay brothers' dormitory, 35.Latrines

The abbey was built primarily during the 12th century. The church, consecrated in 1147, was constructed following the Bernardine blueprint previously used for the abbey church at Fontenay: the choir, the transept and the last bays were completed between 1150 and 1160. From 1170 to 1190 were erected the church wall adjoining the cloister, the chapter house, the monks' room and the monks' dormitory (located on the first floor east of the cloister). Finally, the lay brothers' building was constructed to the west of the cloister.

In the early 13th century, a porch was added to the façade. In the following years the refectory was constructed, south of the cloister. The north and west cloister galleries were built between 1270 and 1280. The gradual disappearance of the lay brothers led to the elimination of the "lay brothers' passage" that provided access to their building; it was replaced by the west cloister gallery, which was complemented by the east gallery (before 1350) and the south gallery (around 1300).

A hydraulic system was installed as early as the 12th century. The monks tapped into a nearby spring located north of the abbey church's transept: surveys revealed the existence of a large duct conduit encircling the monastic buildings located around the cloister. Its structure is uniform, with a height and width ranging from 80 centimetres (31 in) to 129 centimetres (51 in); it is made of rubble masonry and roofed with an unplastered semicircular reinforced barrel vault. It appears to have been constructed at the same time as the monastic ensemble. Other hydraulic installations were discovered on the site, extending from the main collector drain. Inside the cloister, much smaller pipe channels (35 centimetres (14 in) to 50 centimetres (20 in) wide) were uncovered, buried 50 centimetres (20 in) deep. These water networks seem to have been regularly maintained during the Middle Ages and till 16th century.

Throughout the first half of the 13th century, donations kept poured in, comprising woodlands, land, vineyards, ponds, mills and townhouses. At its heyday, the abbey's holdings also included up to fourteen farm estates, seventeen farms, 275 hectares (680 acres) hectares of forest, houses, mills, meadows, and received taxes (tithes, quit-rents).

The Lords of Charenton and other benefactors were buried in the cemetery and the cloister. Some key figures had the honor to be inhumed in the chapter house, together with several abbots:

- Ebbes V of Charenton and his wife Agnès;
- Ebbes VI of Charenton;
- Mahaut, Ebbes VI's daughter;
- Mahaut's husband, Renaud de Montfaucon, who became Lord of Charenton.

From 1322 onwards, the name Noirlac Abbey replaces the calling Maison-Dieu Abbey.

=== Impact of the Hundred Years' War (1337–1453) ===
During the Hundred Years' War, the Berry region and the monastery frequently suffered devastation (e.g. Sir Robert Knolles and his men occupied the buildings between 1358 and 1360). After the war, additional devastation was caused by the wandering Free Companies, then the Écorcheurs and the Praguerie revolt.

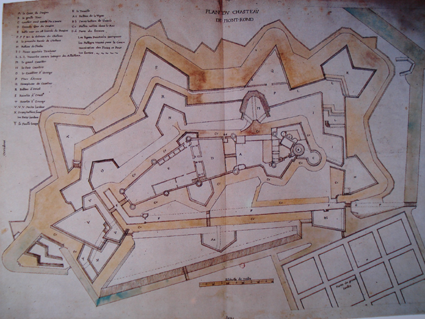
Montrond fortress map, 1650

To defend themselves, the monks undertook the fortification of the abbey. Under the protection of Jean Bourguignon de Saint-Amand, a keep was built. In 1423, the Lord of Orval, Guillaume d'Albret, confirmed a right granted by his father, the Constable of France, to allow the abbey to be fortified and be guarded by a captain. Following the Congress of Arras (1435), Écorcheurs troops led by Rodrigo de Villandrando entered the Berry region. In the spring of 1437, Rodrigo occupied the castle of Montrond and used it as its headquarters. Jean de Bourbon, (aka the bastard of Vendôme, 1420-1496) and his men rallied him in 1438. Due to its proximmity, Noirlac Abbey repeatedly suffered from these brigands' plundering. The keep is still mentioned in records from 1724, but all traces of the structure have since vanished.

Following the end of Hundred Years' War, the Cistercian community experienced a moral crisis: the regular influx of donations and taxes benefiting the abbey turned the monks into rentiers who did no longer need to work for their livelihood. This situation gradually fostered discord and misconduct in the monastery:

- in 1459, a monk who had repeatedly undertook apostasy was nonetheless reinstated by the General Chapter;
- in 1476, a monk was sentenced to life imprisonment by the General Chapter for killing a fellow member of the community.

In order to fight these behaviours, various inquiries were conducted in the abbey, led by abbots from the abbeys of Reigny, Fontmorigny, and Chalivoy. A final attempt at reform took place in 1521, led by the abbot of Bourras Abbey, commissioned by the General Chapter.

=== In commendam rule ===
Noirlac Abbey was placed under the In commendam rule in 1510: this system authorised the abbey management to be transferred to a cleric or layman (as opposed to religious people). This in commendam person could receive the revenues and may exercise a certain degree of jurisdiction, though he held no authority over the monks' internal discipline. In addition, the abbot was now appointed by the king rather than elected by the General Chapter.

As a result, daily life in the monastery dramatically changed. The abbot established his living quarters in the former lay brothers' building, above the storeroom. Together with the monks, he shared a common entrance located beneath the tower. When the abbot was not residing at the abbey, a prior was appointed to ensure operations.

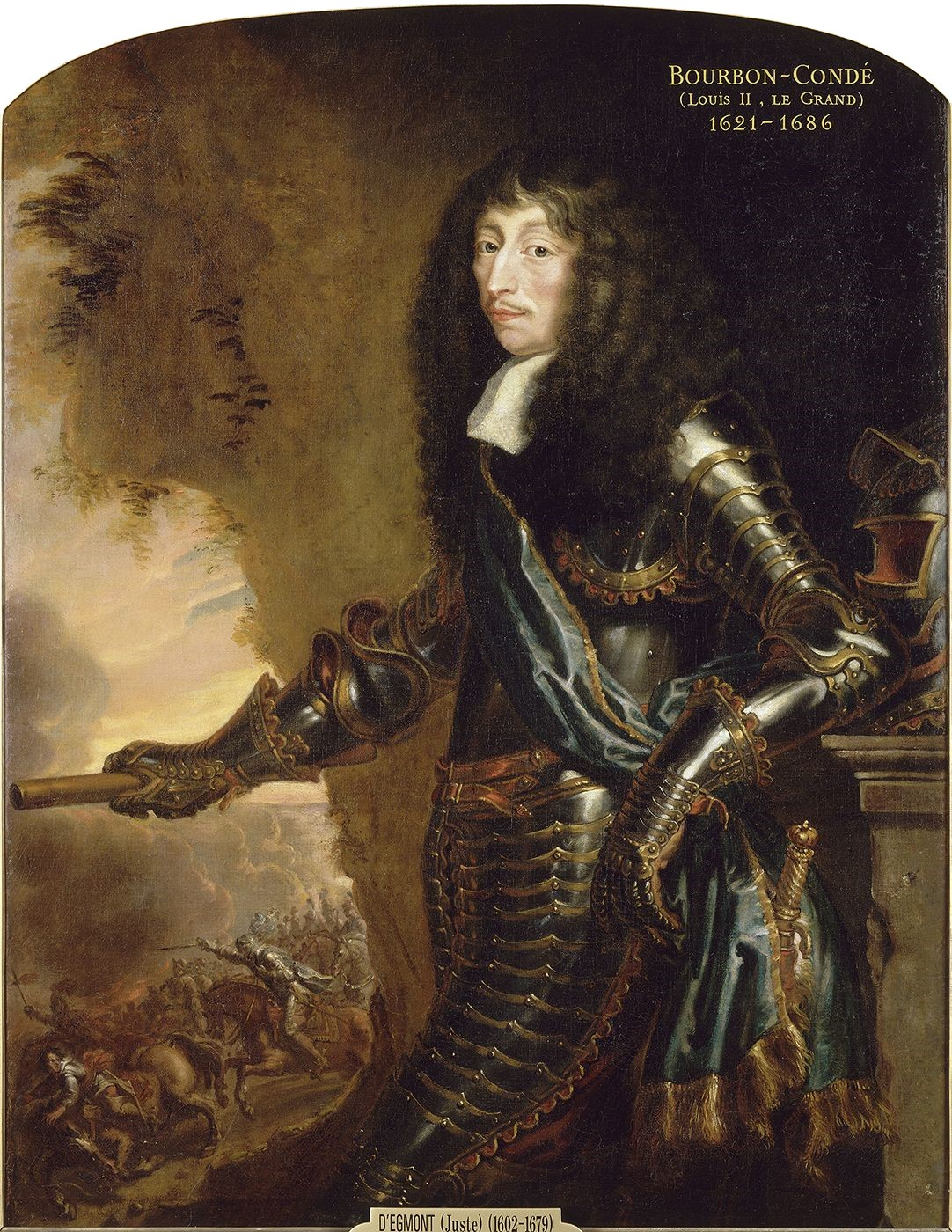
Le Grand Condé

In 1569, Protestant forces commanded by Count Palatine Wolfgang of Zweibrücken invaded the northeastern part of the Berry region. The Huguenot troops were looting the churches along their route. In Noirlac, they appear to have ransacked barns belonging to the abbey. A land register dating from 1600 describes the site without noting any damage to the monastery.

However,The Fronde caused significant destruction to the buildings. Between 1650 and 1652, Louis II de Bourbon (known as the Grand Condé) held the fortress of Saint-Amand-Montrond, then sieged by royal troops. Forces from both sides captured and recaptured the abbey during the siege of the castle, resulting in extensive damage. In 1654, the Abbot of Noirlac reported the demolition of several abbey edifices by soldiers from both parties. No major repairs could be undertaken since by then, the community comprised only four monks.

In the second half of the 17th century, the buildings were divided between the monks and the abbé commendataire (English: lay abbot). The latter kept the lay brothers' housing, the west cloister walk and the great kitchen. The religious community occupied the cloister, the dormitory, the refectory, the guest chamber and the attics above the other three cloister walks. Taking advantage of a dispensation granted by Pope Alexander VII, the monks partitioned the dormitory into individual cells.

=== 18th century rehabilitation by Louis d'Aurillac ===
The condition of the abbey in the early 18th century is known thanks to a visit report by the historian and liturgist Edmond Martène. He then noted:

The Abbey of Noirlac I visited after Fontmorigny, has retained more traces of its former grandeur. The cloisters, the chapter house, the parlor, the novitiate, the refectory and the kitchen all bespeak a certain glory. The kitchen chimney is of a singular structure, being double and projecting into the center of the room. It is said that the Prince, upon seeing it, could not cease admiring the construction. The church remains intact and the choir stalls reflect the simplicity of Saint Bernard’s era. I did not see so many others like them. The Abbot of Clairvaux, during a visitation, had half of these stalls removed...

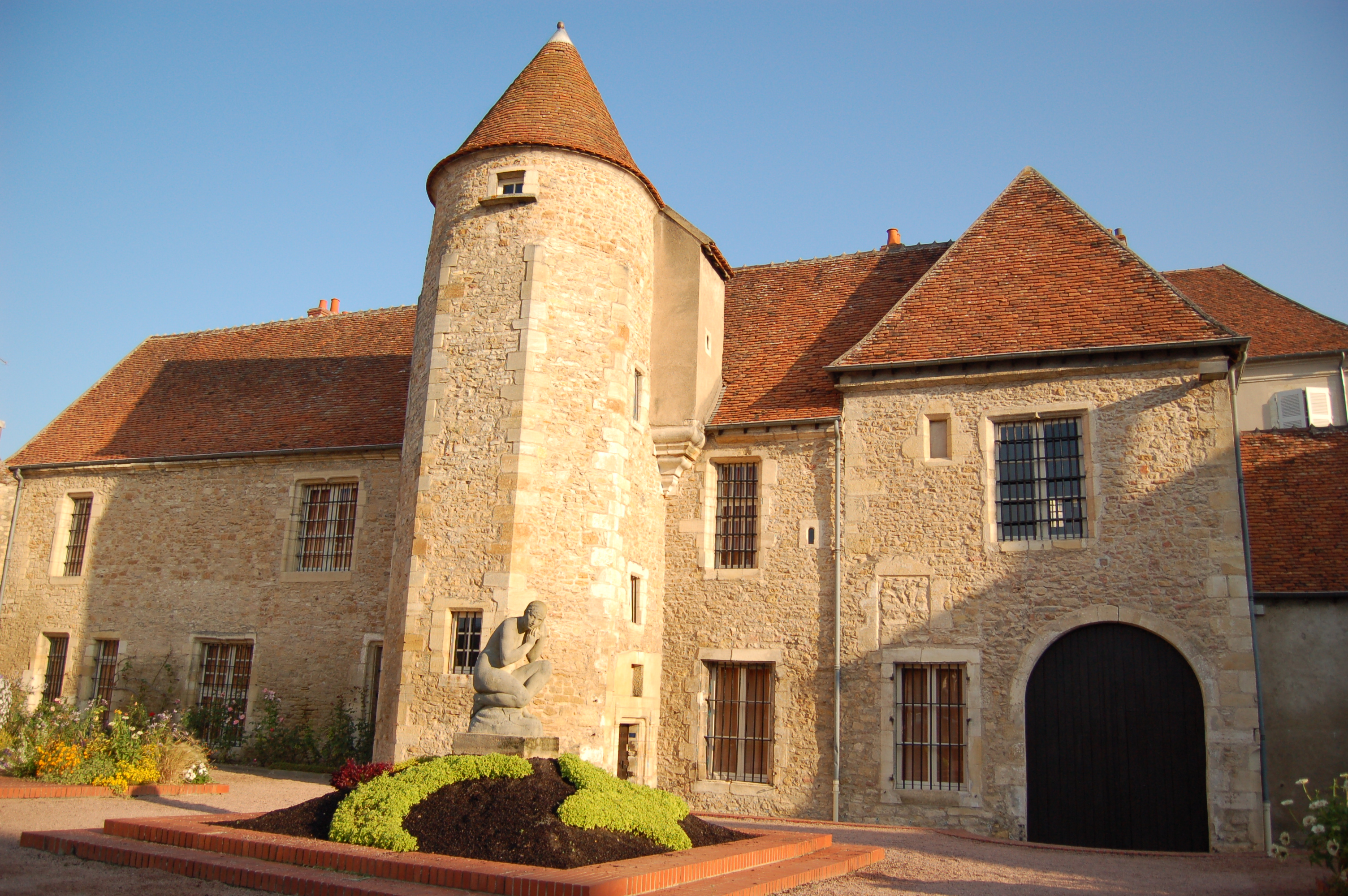
Hôtel Saint-Vic, nowadays Saint-Amand-Montrond's museum

Despite the work undertaken by Abbot Claude de Mauroy, the site was in a sorry state when Antoine Louis d'Aurillac was appointed Abbé commendataire. A list of urgent repairs was drawn up in 1717. The abbey had deteriorated to such an extent that the abbot had to live at the Hôtel Saint-Vic in Saint-Amand-Montrond, while the monks ate in an insalubrious area "where the latrines were located". Initially, Louis d'Aurillac organised a division of the abbey's assets and revenues: he took possession of the Saint-Vic house (now a museum) in Saint-Amand-Montrond, while the lay brothers' dormitory was allocated to the monks. The abbot was responsible for the renovation work, founding it through the abbey's assets and income. He then initiated a series of projects, which started to be implemented between 1724 and 1730.

In 1740, other renovations occurred:

- the refurbishing of the monks' individual cells, as one can see them today;
- the building situated between the east wing (the monks' quarters) and the old refectory was reconstructed and added another room;
- wood panelling was installed in the church;
- guest rooms for monks were created within the old refectory. A monumental staircase was built to provide access to them.

A report submitted to the Archbishop of Bourges in 1766 describes the condition of the abbey after 40 years of works under the lead of Antoine Louis d'Aurillac as its abbot. The community was only five people strong, all of them being priests, and the church was well-maintained. The buildings were in good condition and the dormitory renovated, featuring seven bedrooms. An archive room and another room serving as an infirmary were also built.

=== French Revolution and 19th century ===
In 1790, the abbey was secularised and sold a year later as a national property for 150 000 French livres to Jean Amable Desjobert. Desjobert (1735–1814) was the secretary to the Prince of Soubise, a King's secretary at the Parlement of Paris. A childless widower, Jean Amable lived in Saint-Amand-Montrond and used Noirlac abbey as his country residence. When he died in 1814, he bequeathed his lands to the city.

In 1822, Hall, a British citizen, purchased the abbey to establish a porcelain manufactory. He already held interests in such factories in Creil, Montereau and Gien. The workshop operated from 1822 to 1866, after several adaptative reconstructions:

- an intermediate floor was installed in the church;
- porcelain kilns were installed against the northern wall of the side aisle;
- cloister attics were raised and enlarged;
- two wide openings were cut into the cloister's south gallery, which eventually caused the vaults to collapse;
- openings in the cloister gallery were walled up. The cloister itself was raised to build large attics for drying and storing porcelain.

In 1833, Hall rented the buildings to the Pillivuyt family of Foëcy. The Pillivuyt owned a porcelain manufactory in nearby Mehun-sur-Yèvre, still operating today. The family eventually took over the abbey factory in 1848, integrating it into its other operations in 1854.

In 1837, Prosper Mérimée visited the abbey. In his Notes on a Journey to Auvergne (1838) (French: Notes d'un voyage en Auvergne), he deplored the damage caused by the installation of the porcelain manufactory, as well as the lack of roof maintenance:

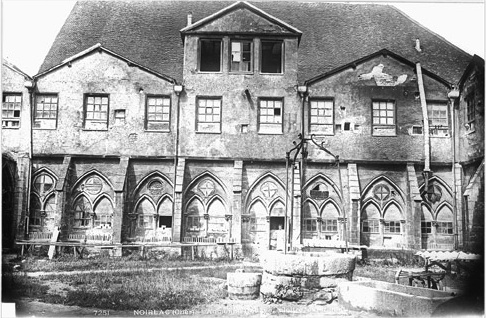
Jean-Eugène Durand , Noirlac - west gallery, 1877

It is regrettable that a church as vast —and in some respects as remarkable— as that of Noirlac has been put to a use that so completely alters its character. Floors and partition walls conceal the original layout; the nave has become a warehouse, and there is not a single room, whether ancient or modern, that has not undergone major and lamentable changes to suit the needs of the factory.

Noirlac Abbey was designated a Monument historique in 1862, though this action did nothing to prevent the damage inflicted by the factory owners. Manufacturing operations came to halt in 1866; workers were taken on by a newly established company in Bruère-Allichamps, still in business today, as Avignon ceramic.

Photographs taken by Jean-Eugène Durand (1845–1926) in 1877, display the scale of the damage: the west gallery of the cloister has been walled up and the building has been raised by one story, with an additional second story added beneath a new central gable. Porcelain is shown drying in front of the gallery.

=== Involvement of the Cher department ===
Cher Department coat of arms

Following the end of commercial operations, the monastery buildings underwent a detailed examination. Abbot Jules Pailler, the parish priest of Saint-Amand-Montrond, took a particular interest in the site. During 1893 excavations of the armaria, which originally served as the monastery's library, the abbot discovered a skeleton alongside a wooden cross within a wall funeral niche (French: enfeu). The remains are believed to be those of Robert de Châtillon, the abbey's founder. Indeed, unlike the other abbots, Robert de Chatillon had not been buried in the chapter house, since that room did not exist at the time of his death. Abbot Jules Pailler purchased the abbey in 1893 with the aim of establishing an orphanage, but the project never came to fruition.

In the meanwhile, Georges Darcy, the architecture advisor for historical monuments in the Cher department and historian Alphonse Buhot de Kersers alerted the ministry about the monument's conservation. Acting upon a report by Paul Selmersheim, the general inspector of Historical Monuments, authorities decided to get involved and support Abbé Pailler in the restoration of the buildings.

The monastery was put up again for sale in 1896: it was purchased by a religious community, the "Sisters, Spouses of the Sacred Heart of the Penitent Jesus" (French: Sœurs épouses du Sacré-Cœur de Jésus pénitent), based in Loigny. The movement was condemned by the Holy Office in 1896 and the community dissolved in 1901. The abbey assets were then placed under sequestration.

On 29 December 1909, Étienne Dujardin-Beaumetz, undersecretary for Fine Arts, visited the abbey. Thanks to his support, the Cher department immediately acquired the ensemble with a substantial financial assistance from the State. The Historic Monuments service carried out conservation works, directed by Lucien Roy (1850–1941), followed by Henri Huignard (1891–1950).

Between 1909 and 1910, Noirlac site was used as a holiday camp for The Little Singers of Paris.

From 1938 to 1939, the abbey housed an internment camp for Spanish refugees fleeing the Spanish Civil War during La Retirada. Most of the 5,000 numbered people over the course of 1939 were regularly dispersed during family reunification moves. In April 1939, Jean Zay, then Minister of Fine Arts, ordered the evacuation of Monuments Historiques buildings. However, the prefect could not comply with the injunction due to a lack of alternative accommodation. It was not until October 1939 that the refugees still present were transferred to the Castle of Châteaufer, 8 kilometres (5.0 mi) north of Noirlac. A few weeks later, the site hosted a temporary 70-bed hospital, aiming to treat epidemics and illnesses caused by nutrition deficiencies.

During WWII, the abbey buildings were used as an annex to the Saint-Amand-Montrond hospice.

=== Rehabilitation into a cultural centre ===
By 1949, once more, Noirlac abbey found itself empty. Restoration works began in 1950, under the direction of Michel Ranjard and Pierre Lebouteux, historical monument architects of the Cher department. They spanned three decades.

The renovation ended in 1980, under the lead of architect Jean Dedieu. The project included the installation in the church and the refectory, of stained-glass windows designed by Jean-Pierre Raynaud (1977).

In 2007, the Cher Department authorities established a Public Institution for Cultural Cooperation (French: Établissement public de coopération culturelle, EPCC) to manage the site of Noirlac. A year later, this institution was awarded the label of "Cultural Meeting Centre" (French: Centre culturel de rencontre) by the Ministry of Culture. It is a member of the European network of Cultural Meeting Centres.

Since then, the abbey has pursued projects focused on preserving and showcasing its exceptional heritage, as well as fostering artistic creation and knowledge transmission by hosting or exhibiting numerous artists.

== List of Abbots ==
The list of abbots of Noirlac Abbey was compiled by Dom Chevillard. It covers the period from its foundation to the year 1746, with one final abbot added subsequently.

=== Regular abbots ===
- 1136 Robert de Châtillon-sur-l'Allier
- 1163 Guido (i.e., Guy I)
- 1170 Francon
- 1180 Guillaume I
- 1218 Robert II
- 1223 Hélie
- 1230 Robert III
- 1232 Raoul
- 1240 Robert IV
- 1243 Pierre
- 1256 Garnier
- 1270 Guy II
- 1274 Hugues
- 1282 Guillaume II
- 1291 Bérenger
- 1298 Jean I
- 1313 Renauld
- 1349 Gaultier
- 1365 Renauld de Corbigny
- 1410 Jean Tendron
- 1423 Guillaume de Villeneuve
- 1426 Hervier
- 1444 Jean II
- 1451 Hervier Persil
- 1470 Hervier Aubry
- 1493 Robert Sandrin
- 1502 Jean de la Châtre
- 1506 Dauphin Torloys

=== In commendam abbots ===
- 1510 Claude de Mesnil
- 1514 Étienne de Mesnil
- 1520 Jean Pennot
- 1538 Jacques d'Albret
- 1544 César Juvenal
- 1557 Tiburce Burce
- 1573 Tiburce Burce the Younger
- 1581 Pierre de Thollet
- 1591 Jean de Thollet
- 1600 Guillaume de l'Aubespine
- 1613 Charles de l'Aubespine
- 1648 Camille de Neuville
- 1654 François de Berthemet
- 1692 Claude de Mauroy
- 1714 Antoine Louis d'Aurillac
- 1759 Charles François de Lubersac

== Characteristics ==
=== A structure built around the cloister ===
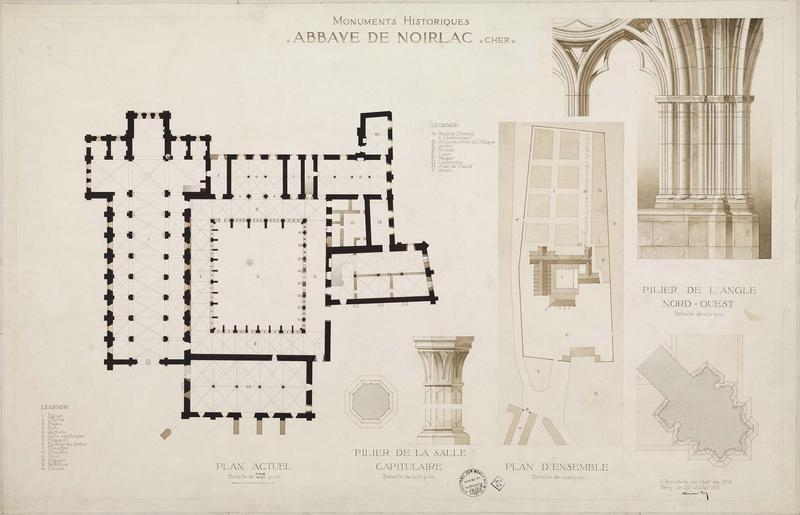
Map of the abbey by Lucien Roy, 1912

Cistercian rules required a strict separation in the community between the monks and the lay brothers. The layout of the buildings in Cistercian architecture ensures this separation is maintained. Main buildings are arranged around a four-side-gallery cloister. This circulation space was reserved for the monks and provided them with access to all the buildings intended for their use.

Beyond the buildings clustered around the cloister lied the following elements:

- service buildings (now the ticket office);
- the cemetery (to the north - no longer extant);
- the gardens (to the east);
- the entrance (now incorporated into the small village).

The cloister entrance dates from the 18th century reconstruction. It is located at the southwest corner, next to the storeroom. Today, this opening is used for cultural events held inside the cloister.

View of two galleries

The current cloister dates back to the 13th and 14th centuries. The original structure was older: the eastern gallery was erected in the mid-12th century, at the same time as the church.

- The northern gallery provides access to the abbey church via two doorways: the one opening into the first bay was used by lay brothers while the other one leading to the last bay was reserved for the monks.
- The eastern gallery provides access to the sacristy (connected to the church), the chapter house, the 18th-century staircase to the monks' dormitory and the warming room. This gallery still displays, near the church, a stone arch where is located the 12th-century burial recess which is thought to have held the remains of Robert de Châtillon-sur-l'Allier, the first abbot.
- The southern gallery leads to the refectory and the kitchen. Some of its vaults collapsed when Noirlac abbey was used as a porcelain factory.
- The western gallery does open onto the building reserved for the lay brothers, an area the monks could not access. Before this gallery was built, another gallery enclosed the cloister further to the east, and a passageway known as the lay brothers' alley (French: ruelle des convers) ran between that gallery and the lay brothers' building. Such spaces were very frequent in Cistercian abbeys.

=== Abbey church ===
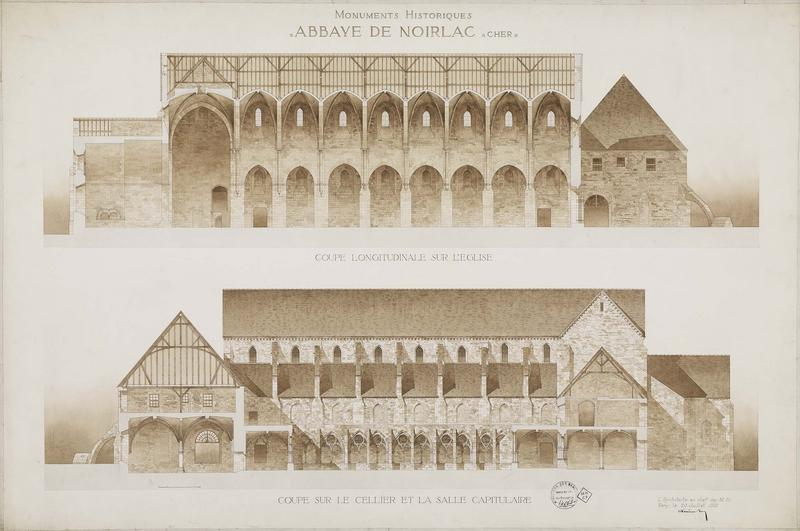
Longitudinal section of Noirlac church, Lucien Roy, 1912

The church was built to meet the requirements of Cistercian liturgy. The choir is shallow, with a single altar and two side chapels, one on each side, are opening onto the transept. The nave accommodated the monks, the infirm and sick, and the lay brothers in this order, while the side aisles were reserved for guests and servants.

Dimensions of the church and main rooms
Length of the church	59 metres (194 ft)
Length of the transept	28 metres (92 ft)
Width of the transept	7.95 metres (26.1 ft)
Width of the nave	7.95 metres (26.1 ft)
Width of the nave including side aisles	17.5 metres (57 ft)
Width of the sanctuary	7.1 metres (23 ft)
Chapter house	12.7 metres (42 ft) by 8.5 metres (28 ft)
Refectory	24.25 metres (79.6 ft) by 11.35 metres (37.2 ft)
Monks' room	16.95 metres (55.6 ft) by 8.3 metres (27 ft)

Access points also follow Cistercian customs:

- a doorway in the north wall of the transept's north arm leads to the monks' cemetery (no more extant);
- a door in the south wall of the south transept arm leads to the sacristy. Another, positioned higher up, gives access to the monks' dormitory;
- a door in the southernmost bay is reserved for the monks;
- a door in the first southern bay was used for the lay brothers.
- the western door, used for guests, opened onto a canopy (now destroyed).

This layout mirrors the general plan of the abbey church at Fontenay.

Construction started with the choir, the transept and the last two bays of the nave (1136 to 1150) A second building phase comprised the first six bays and the western façade (completed by 1230). Discreet architectural details visible between the sixth and seventh bays are a testimony of this phasing.

==== The apse and the transept ====
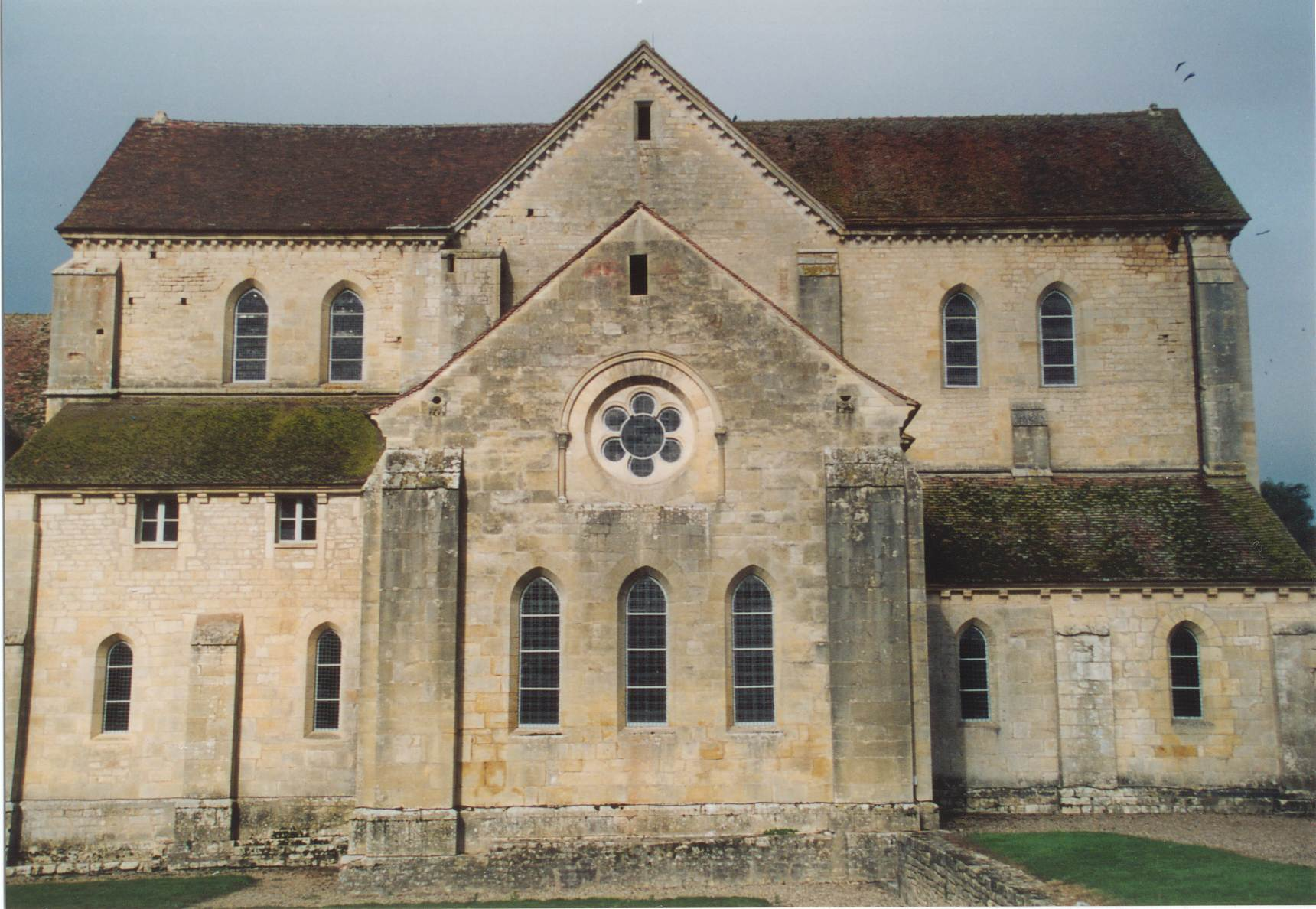
The apse and the transept from outside

In its current state, the apse of the church comprises a choir, lower than the rest of the building, closed by a flat wall framed by two buttresses. This wall is pierced by three lancet windows, topped by a rose window. Each of the four side chapels also displays a small lancet window. The apse construction started between 1136 and 1150, and the transept was completed around 1150. A piscina is set into the south wall of the choir.

In 1940, both transept bays still housed an upper level: the northern one, in poor condition, was removed during the restoration, while the 18th century southern upper level was preserved and refurbished. The vault of the transept crossing displays a keystone with an oculus which allows the passage of ropes for the bells located above the transept.

In 1157, the General Chapter of the Cistercian Order issued precise regulations regarding the use and location of bells within the Order's houses:

1. bell towers could not be made of stone, only small-scale wooden towers were allowed;
2. bell weight was limited to 500 pounds (230 kg);
3. only two bells were permitted;

Transept's timber framework has been preserved. The bell tower itself is gone but its footprint remains discernible in the framing of the transept crossing. According to a dendrochronology analysis conducted in 1999, the roof structure of the south transept arm dates from 1170 while the north arm dates back to 1187–1188 (contemporary with the bell tower erection).

==== The western facade ====
The western façade suffered significant damage, partially mitigated by recent restorations. The entrance to the church was originally made through a portal located beneath a porch, destroyed during the fire at the abbey in the 16th century (The Fronde's years).

Only two columns and the stem of the rib vaults are left and visible today. Above the portal lies a single original rose window. To the right, one can still notice a gun port, a remnant of the monastery's fortifications from the Hundred Years' War: it is located beneath the walled-up window opening that used to give onto the attic space.

== Monks buildings ==
The eastern section of the cloister was used exclusively by the monks. The original edifice has significantly been altered in the 18th century and during the extensive refurbishing of the 20th century.

The building includes two levels:

- on the gound floor:
  - the sacristy;
  - the chapter house with a passageway leading to the garden;
  - the monks' staircase;
  - the parlor and a warming room featuring a fireplace.
- on the upper floor:
  - the monks' dormitory;
  - the abbot's chamber, located above the sacristy's bay (not extant), as mentioned in the État général de tous les meubles et ustensiles (English: General Inventory of All Furniture and Utensils) drawn up in 1751. Today, rooms have been set up in this space.

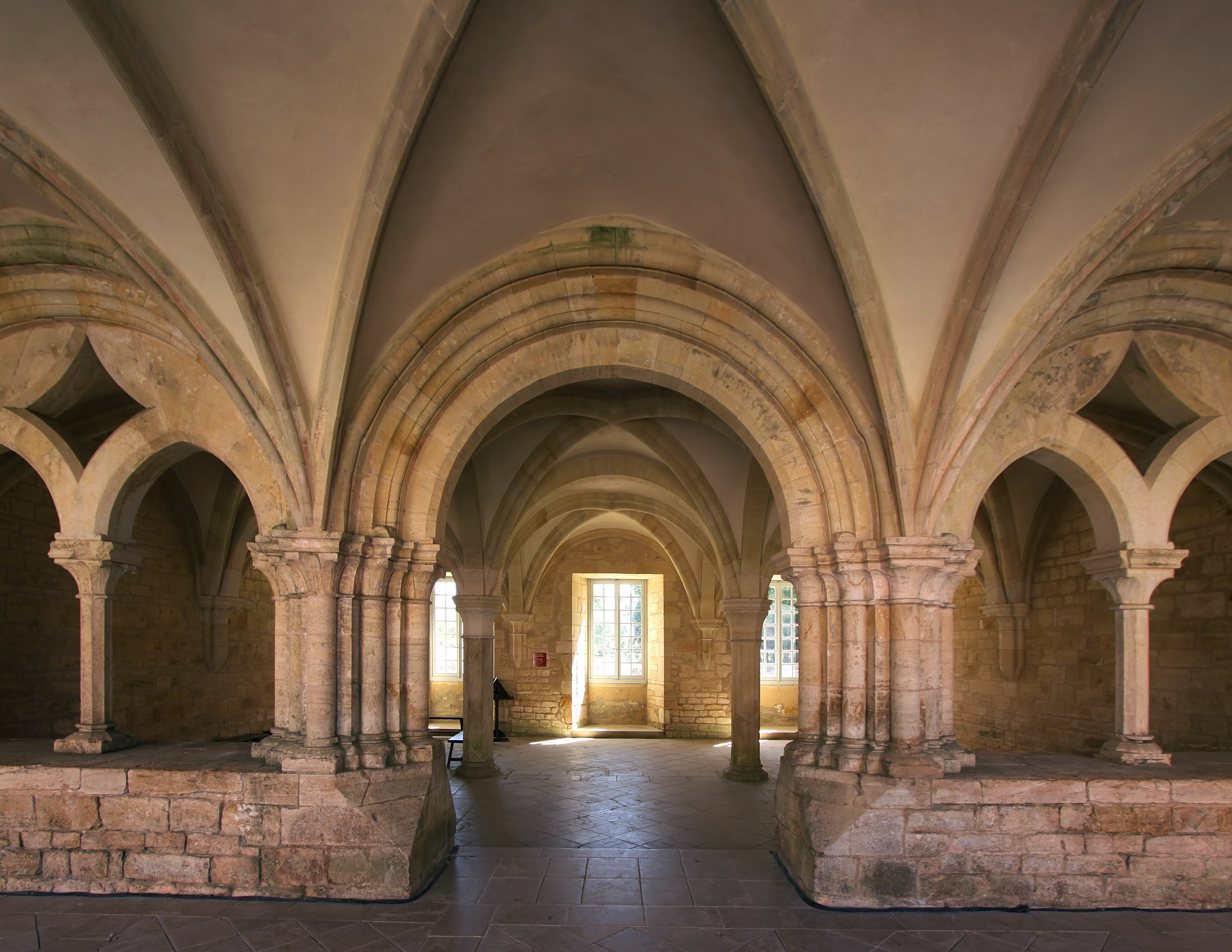
Chapter House, seen from the cloister eastern gallery

=== The Chapter House ===
The chapter house was reserved for chapter meetings; it was used as well as a reading room. At the end of the 12th century, there were around fifty choir monks, the only ones to have a say (French: avoir voix au chapitre). By the 13th century, only a dozen remained, they were five left in 1756.

In Cistercian abbeys, this room is generally more finely decorated than the rest of the edifice. There was an open connection between the chapter house and the cloister galleries: the doorway was not closed off and the side openings were not glazed. One room pilar is octagonal while another one features fluting details. Pilar capitals are adorned with leaf motifs and topped by abaci. East windows have been reconstructed in the 18th century during the major renovations undertaken by the Abbot of Aurillac.

Excavations have uncovered burials: the remains have not been identified, but a Gallia Christiana records that most of the abbots up to the 15th century used to be entombeb in the chapter house. Ebbes of Charenton and several members of his family were also interred here.

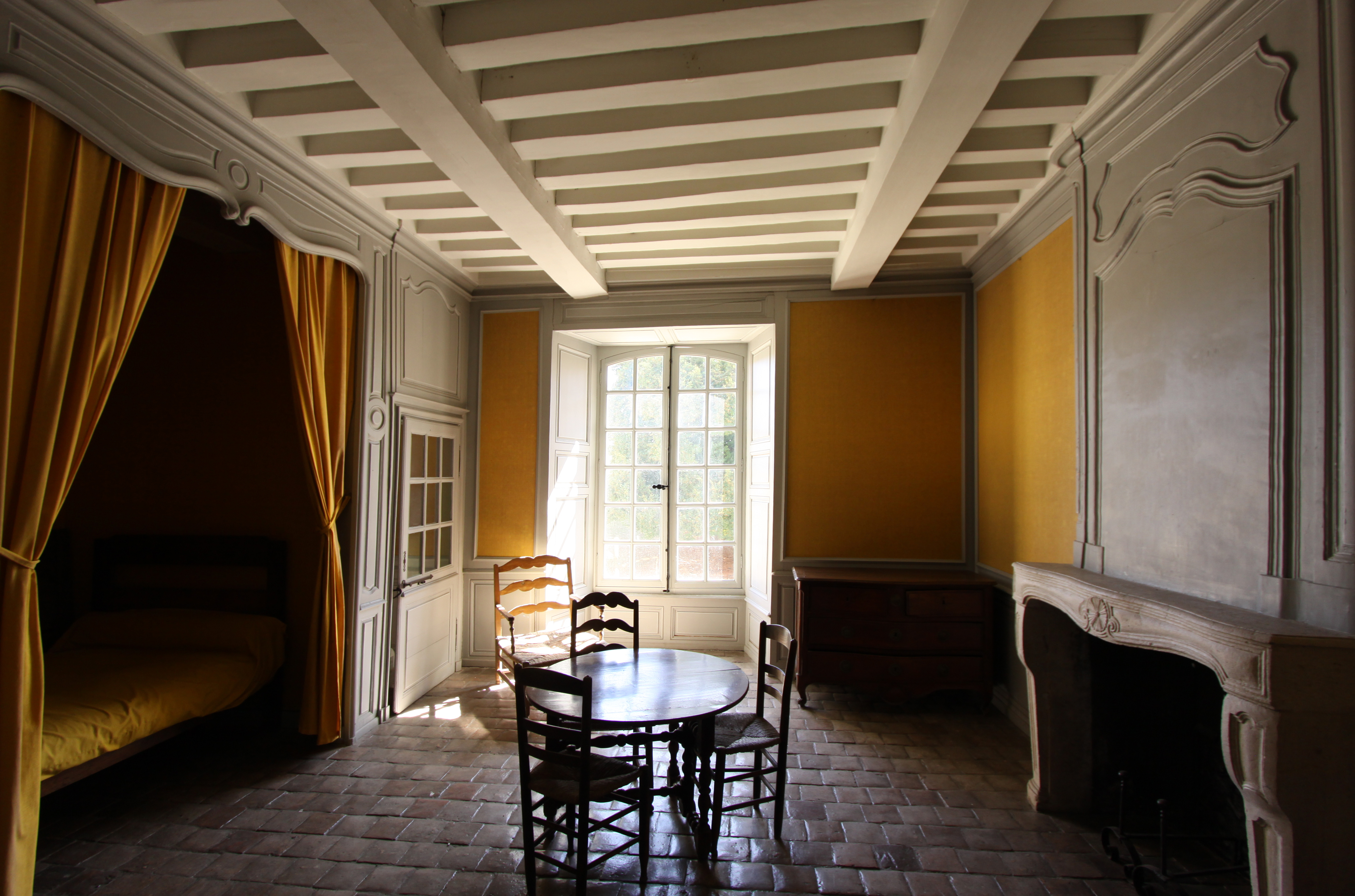
An 18th century monk's bedroom

=== The monks' dormitory ===
The monks slept in a communal hall until Pope Alexander VI, around 1500, authorized them to sleep in individual cells. Renovations carried out by the Abbot of Aurillac in the 18th century are described in a 1756 record as a new dormitory containing seven rooms, all very clean and well-furnished.

A corridor provides access to six rooms and the former abbot's chamber (not preserved). Halfway along the corridor, a passageway leads to two bedrooms and gives access to a small balcony overlooking the gardens. All rooms have the same lay out: wood paneled with a fireplace and a bed located in an alcove located between two small closets.

=== The south building ===
This wing is an extension of the monks' building, located at its southern end. Its structure is largely medieval, it was remodeled in the 18th century but underwent significant alteration after the abbey ceased to function as a religious place.

The ground floor houses an infirmary with its fireplace, spanning two bays. In the upper floor is located a small apartment for the prior, who used to substitute the abbot in his absence. It comprises an anteroom, a bedroom, two small rooms and a woodshed.

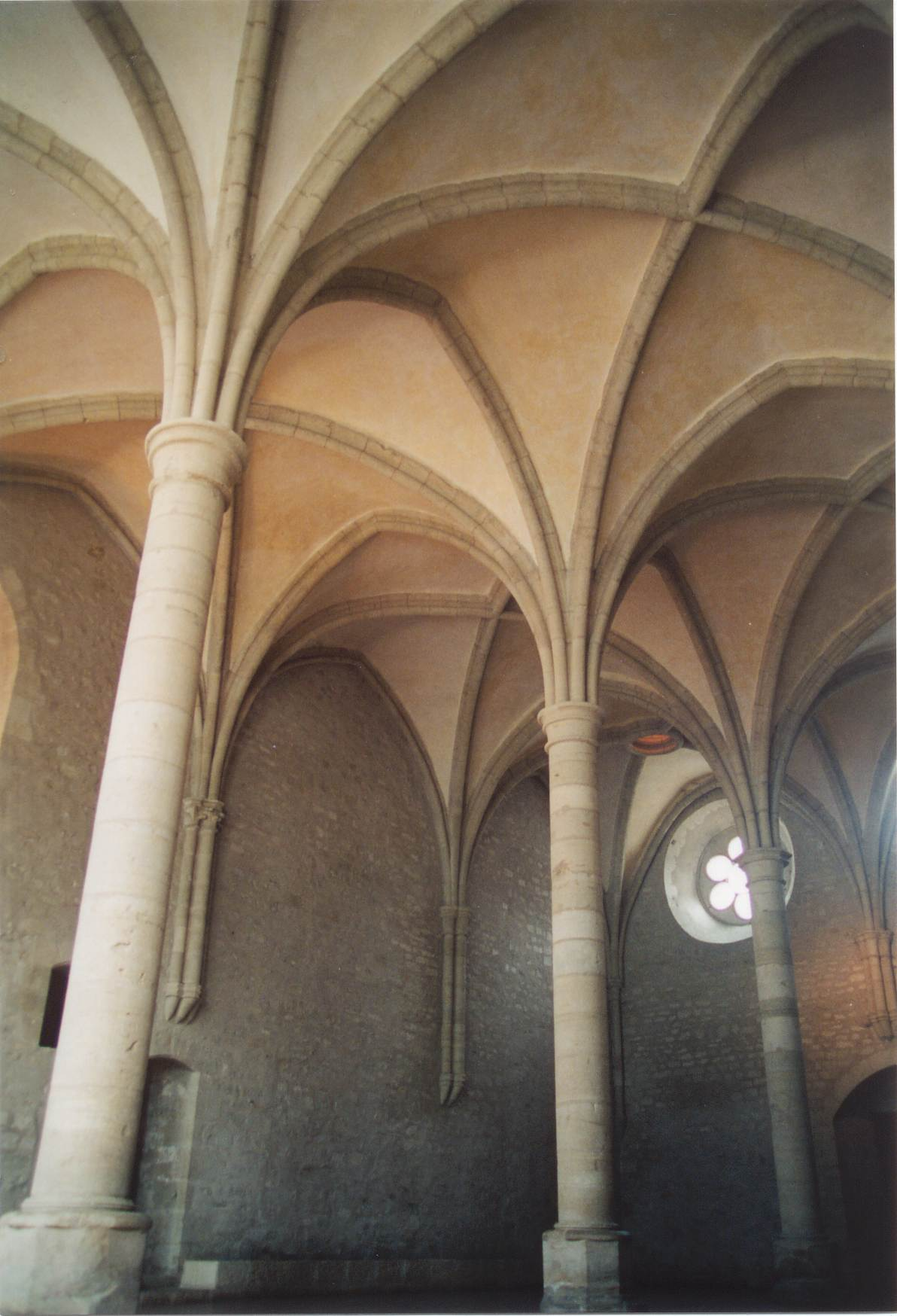
The refectory

=== The south wing and the refectory ===
The monk's refectory covers the main part of the south wing; two large halls adjoin it to the east. To the north lay the kitchens and the lay brothers' refectory: both buildings are non extant today.

The monks' refectory regained its original proportions following the 20th-century restoration. Its footprint is a long rectangle with a slightly skew angled south wall. The area is divided into eight bays by three tall, smooth columns and covered by rib vaults. Sun light is allowed to enter through lancet windows placed in the south gable and rose windows in the north and south gables. The reader's pulpit, used by an assigned monk during the meals, is set into the west wall and accessed via a short flight of steps built into the thickness of the wall. Traces of the benches where the monks sat to eat along the walls can still be noticed.

In the 18th century, the works of rehabilitation launched by the Abbot of Aurillac dramatically altered the refectory's interiors. Indeed, a mezzanine floor was installed and the refectory was converted into guest quarters divided into several rooms. Three rooms on the ground floor (also known as the lower apartment) and three others upstairs (i.e the upper apartment). Furthermore, a two-flight stone staircase, with an intermediate landing and a wrought-iron railing, was set up in order to provide access to the upper floor. During the 20th-century restoration, this staircase was dismantled and reassembled in an adjacent room, now giving direct access to the monks' dormitory.

=== The lay brothers' building ===
This wing is the only surviving structure from the lay brothers' ensemble. Both the kitchen and the dedicated refectory have disappeared.

The ground floor of the lay brothers' building served as a storeroom: small silos and a vat have been found there. The upper floor housed a dormitory; its roof has been restored. The original framework dates back to the 1240s-1250s. The dormitory fire mentioned in historical records can still be traced by the presence of charred wood.

=== The service building ===
Today, the service building houses the visitor welcome centre and the caretaker's quarters.

The entire structure dates back to the 12th century. At that time, the ground floor harboured at least three groin-vaulted rooms, including a large central hall.

== Gallery ==
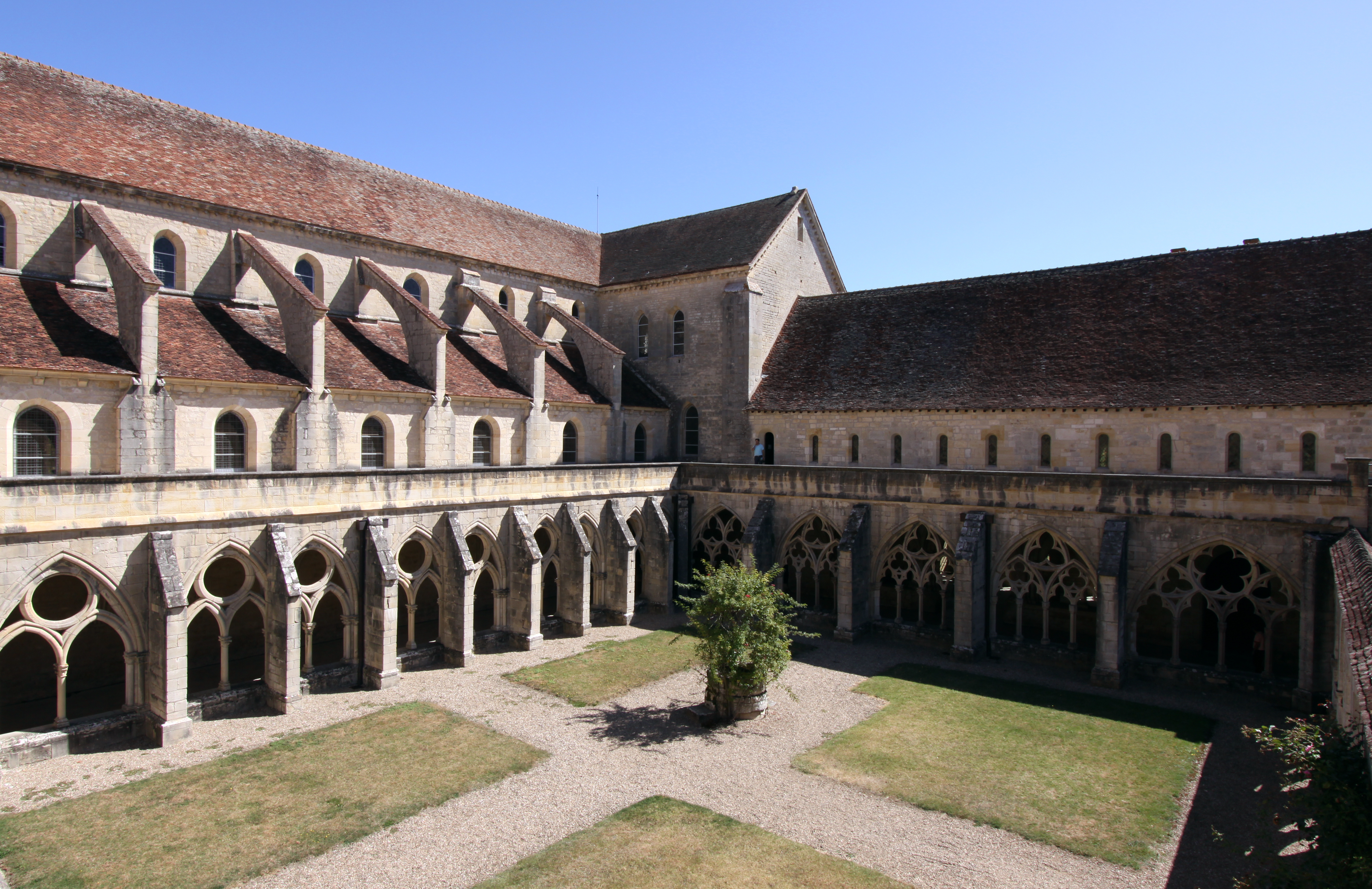
Abbey church and dormitory of the abbey, viewed from the cloister

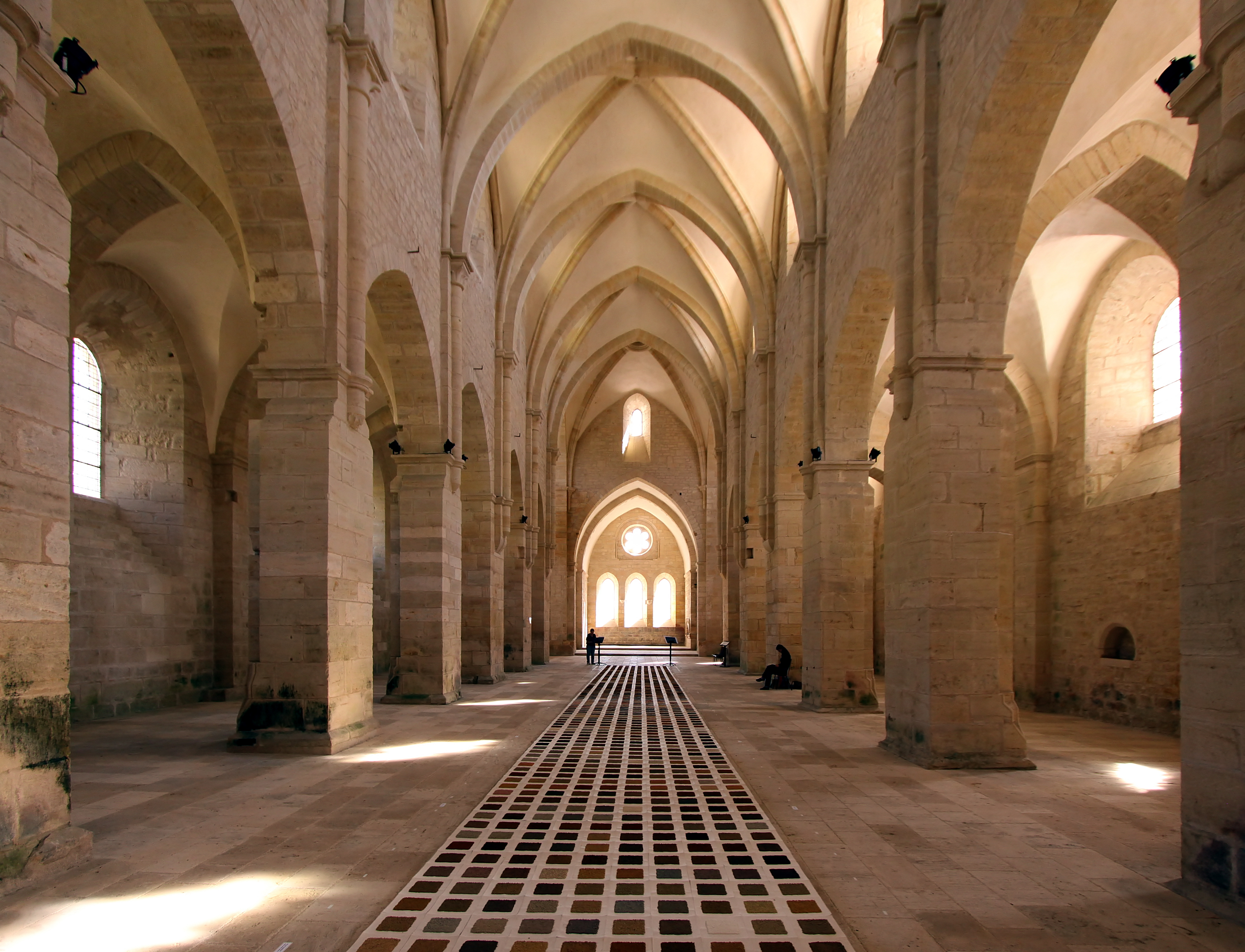
Church transept

Church - detail of a pilar

Refectory - Lancet and rose windows

Refectory building

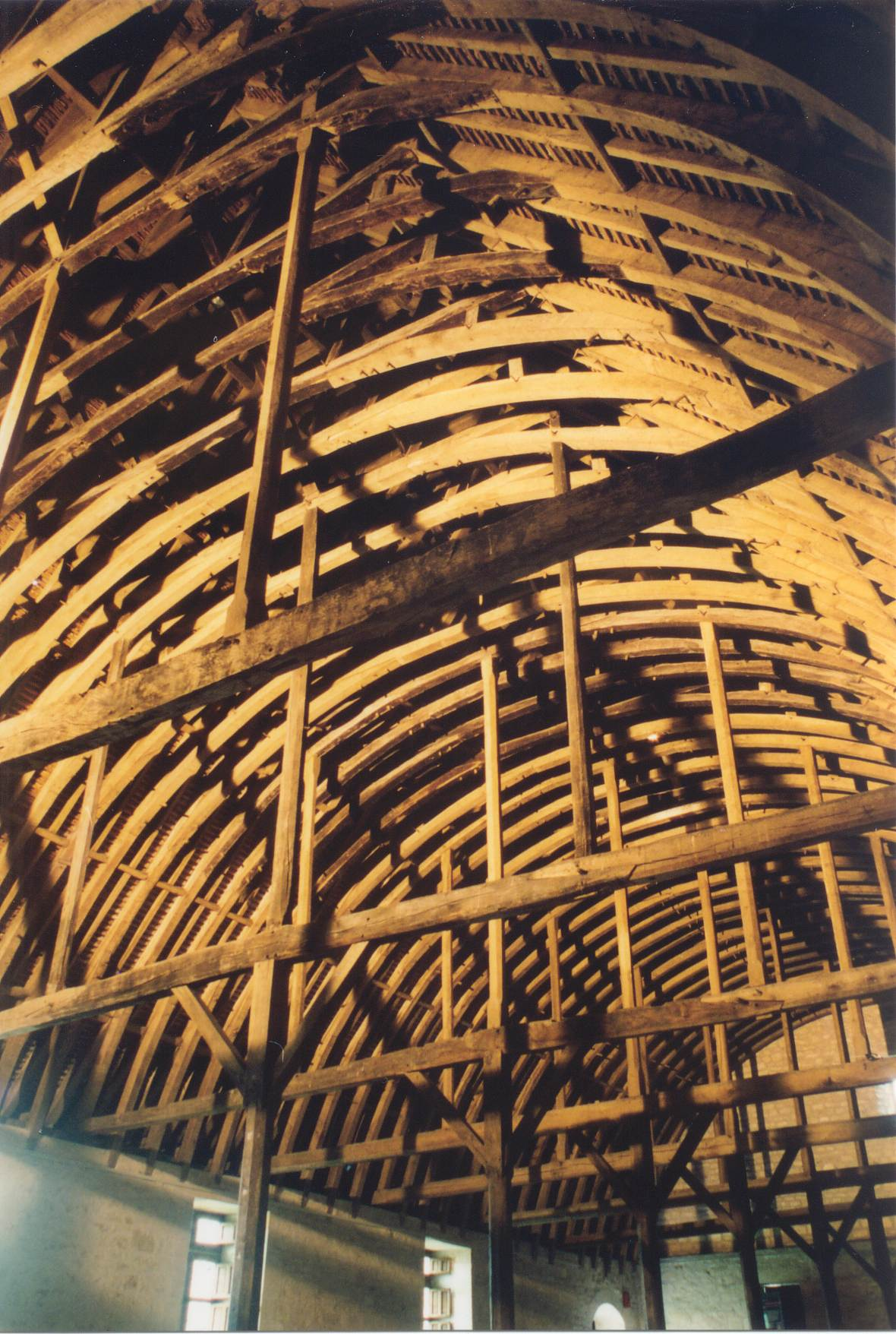
Restored wooden structure - lay brothers' dormitory

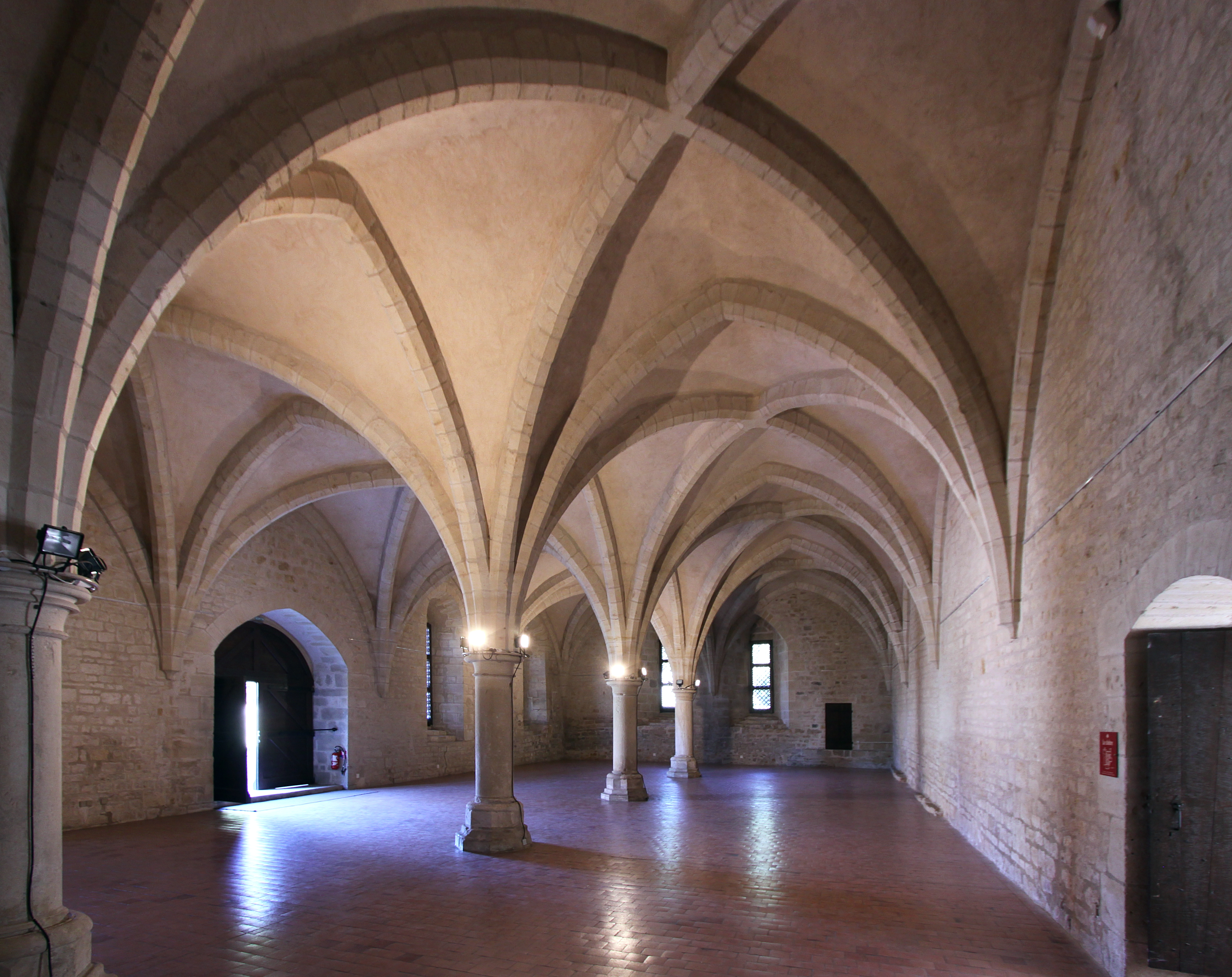
Cellar

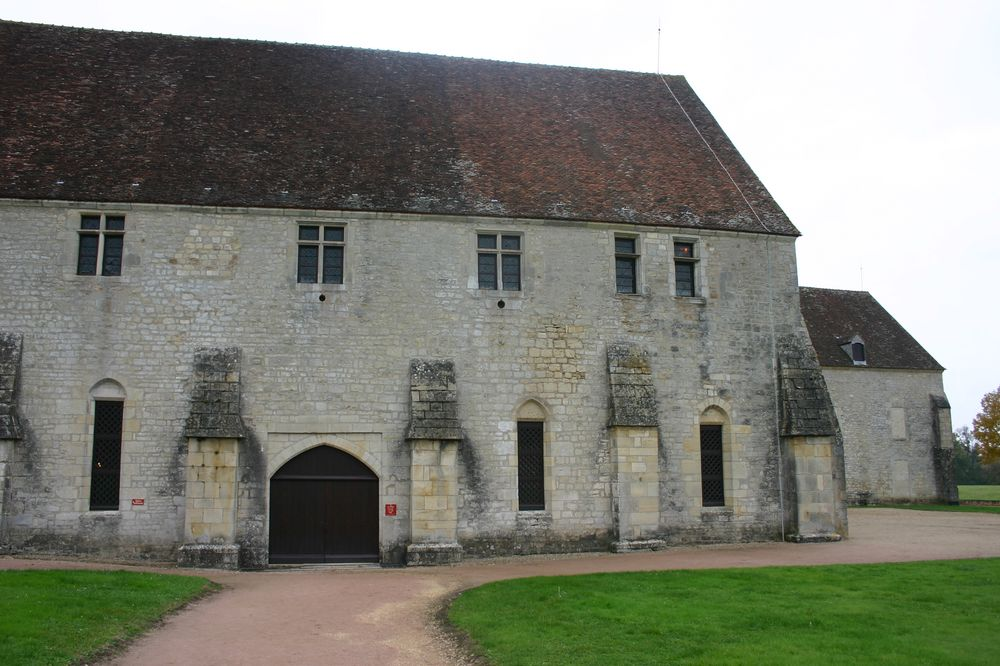
Cellar building

== See also ==
- List of Cistercian monasteries in France
- Monument historique
- Conrad of Eberbach
- Saint-Amand-Montrond
- Pillivuyt

== Bibliography ==
- (in French) Isnard, Isabelle; Sarda, Marie-Anne; Bouvet, Hubert; Cantalupo, Thierry; Thibaut, Pierre; Guérid, Myriam (2011). Noirlac, Images du patrimoine [Noirlac, Images of Heritage] (in French). Lyon: Lieux dits. ISBN 978-2-914528-97-9.
- (in French) Meslé, Émile; Jenn, Jean-Marie (1979). Abbaye de Noirlac [Noirlac Abbey] (in French). Paris: Caisse nationale des monuments historiques et des sites.
- (in French) Aubert, Marcel (1932). L'abbaye cistercienne de Noirlac, Congrès archéologique de France. 94e session [The Cistercian Abbey of Noirlac, Archaeological Congress of France. 94th Session] (in French). Paris: Société Générale d'imprimerie et d'édition. pp. 175–224.
- (in French) Plat, Jean (1924). Abbaye de Noirlac, près Saint-Amand: son histoire, son architecture, d'après des documents inédits [Noirlac Abbey, near Saint-Amand: its history and architecture, based on unpublished documents] (in French). Saint-Amand: Imprimerie A. Clerc.
