= Bechyně Bridge =

Rail and road bridge in the Czech Republic

Bechyně Bridge Bechyňský most
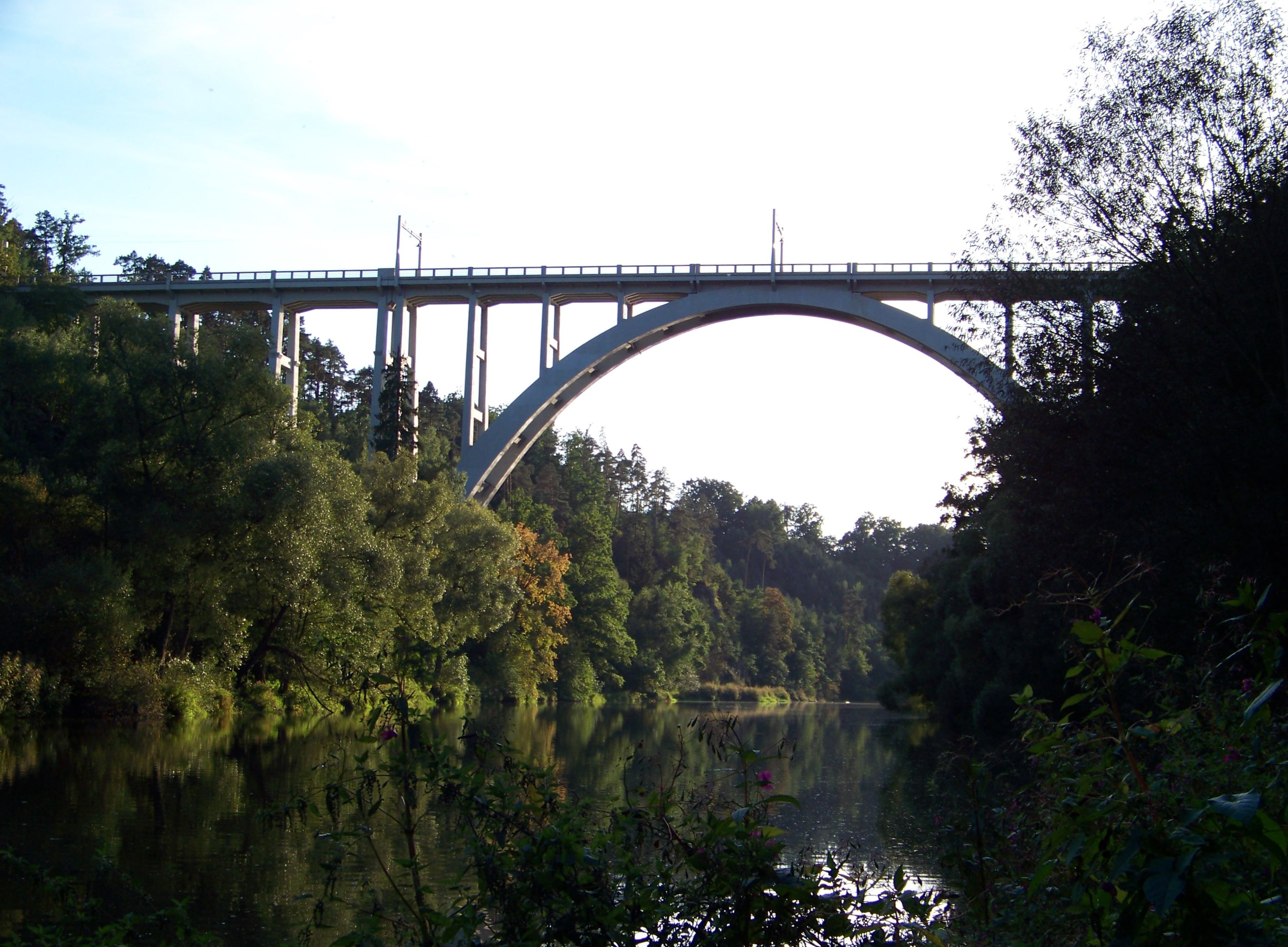
- Bechyně Bridge
- Coordinates: 49°17′47″N 14°28′49″E
- Crosses: Lužnice
- Locale: Bechyně

History
- Construction start: 1926
- Construction end: 1928
- Opened: 28 October 1928

Location
- Interactive map of Bechyně Bridge

Bechyně Bridge (Czech: Bechyňský most) also known as Bechyně Rainbow, rarely Rainbow Bridge, originally called the Jubilee Bridge, is a unique reinforced concrete arch bridge over the Lužnice river on the eastern edge of Bechyně in the South Bohemian Region of the Czech Republic. It is a combined bridge for road and rail traffic, used by Czech Route 122 (Týn nad Vltavou–Bechyně–Opařany) and the Tábor–Bechyně railway line.

During passage of trains, road traffic from Týn nad Vltavou to Bechyně is stopped by a crossing safety device without a barrier; the opposite direction of traffic is unaffected by the train. In 2014 the bridge was declared a national cultural monument.

== Technical data ==
The bridge is made of reinforced concrete, with a height over the river below of less than 60 meters. The total length is 190.5 m, and the width is 8.9 m. The main arc has a span of 90 m and a rise of 38 m, and a subsidiary field of 4 × 13.5 m and 3 × 15.5 m. The main field is made up of two arched passages connected by bracings. The distance of the arches at the top is 6 m, at the base 8.25 m, and the peak height of the columns is 28 m.

Between September 2003 and October 2004, repair, reconstruction and control work were carried out on the bridge, as well as on the track and road.
