= ČSD Class E 426.0 =

ČSD E 426.0 ČD 113
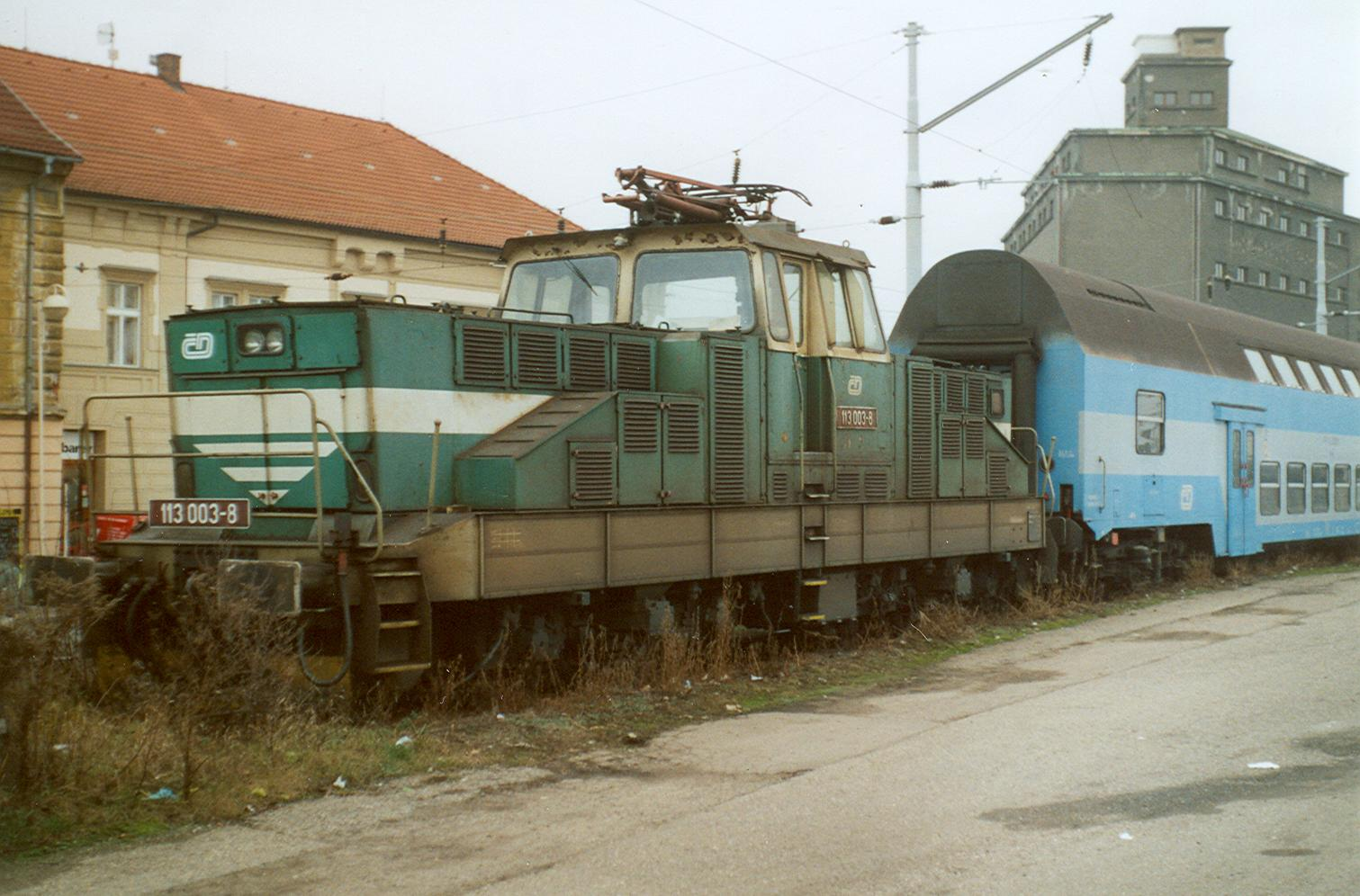
- 113 003-8 in Tábor
Type and origin
- Power type: Electric
- Builder: Škoda Works
- Build date: 1973
- Total produced: 6
Specifications
- Configuration
  - UIC: Bo′Bo′
- Gauge: 1,435 mm (4 ft 8 1/2 in) standard gauge
- Wheel diameter: 1,050 mm (3 ft 5 in)
- Length: 14,400 mm (47 ft 3 in)
- Width: 2,940 mm (9 ft 8 in)
- Height: 4,640 mm (15 ft 3 in)
- Loco weight: 64 tonnes (63 long tons; 71 short tons)
- Electric system/s: 1500 V DC overhead lines
- Current pickup: Pantograph
Performance figures
- Maximum speed: 80 km/h (50 mph)
- Power output: 800 kW (1,073 hp)
Career
- Operators: ČSD » ČD
- Class: ČSD: E 426.0, later 113; ČD 113
- Number in class: 4
- Numbers: 113 001-2 – 113 004-6

The locomotives of ČSD's Class E 426.0 (ČD's Class 113) are essentially ČSD Class E 458.0 locomotives redesigned to work from the 1500 V DC overhead wire electrification system. They are retained for use on line 202 from Tábor to Bechyně.

When delivered, the class E 426.0 locomotives ran at half the power of an E 458.0, reflecting the lower line voltage. During 1992, 113 002-0 was modified to allow parallel connection of the traction motors. This allowed operation at the full power rating (800 kW). Locomotives 113 001-2 and 113 003-8 were similarly modified. The remaining locomotive (113 004-6) was not modified. Locomotive 113 004-6 was officially written off by Czech Railways (ČD) in April 2013. It was subsequentially scrapped on July 24, 2014.

Similarly, as improvements were made to the locomotives (and their E 458.0/110 cousins), their maximum speed rating was improved from 50 km/h (31 mph) to 80 km/h (50 mph). The line speed on the route to Bechyně is restricted to 60 km/h (37 mph).

The two remaining locomotives (113 005-3 and 113 006-1) are now used as 3000 V DC system locomotives. During 2004, they were renumbered as 110 205-2 and 110 206-0 respectively.

== See also ==
- List of České dráhy locomotive classes
