= Keramik Laufen =

Swiss ceramics manufacturer

- Trade name: LAUFEN Bathrooms AG
- Formerly: Tonwarenfabrik Laufen AG
- Industry: Ceramics
- Founded: 1892
- Founders: Albert Borer; Johann Spillmann; Joseph Gerster
- Headquarters: Laufen, Switzerland
- Number of locations: 5 production sites (Switzerland, Austria, Czech Republic, Poland)
- Area served: Worldwide (more than 170 countries)
- Products: Sanitary ceramics; stoneware floor tiles; porcelain tableware
- Revenue: CHF 300 million (2005)
- Number of employees: 2,000 (2005)
- Parent: Compañía Roca Radiadores (from 1999)
- Website: laufen.com

Keramik Laufen is a Swiss ceramics company founded in 1892 in Laufen as the Tonwarenfabrik Laufen AG. Originally a tile works, it set up a subsidiary to produce sanitary ceramics in 1925 and, through acquisitions abroad, developed into a company operating worldwide. In 1999 it was sold to the Spanish company Compañía Roca Radiadores.

== History ==
The Thonwaren-Fabrik in Laufen, in an undated photograph by Eugène Cattin

In 1892 Albert Borer, Johann Spillmann, and Joseph Gerster founded the Tonwarenfabrik Laufen AG in Laufen. The mechanized tile works, which had a water-power installation and its own clay pit, began operating in 1893. In 1925 the subsidiary AG für Keramische Industrie Laufen was set up to produce sanitary ceramics. By 1929 the firm had acquired stakes in regional tile and brick factories, and in 1938 it added the manufacture of stoneware floor tiles.

Through acquisitions in Brazil in 1952, at Kandern near Lörrach at the end of the 1950s, in the United States in 1985, in the Czech Republic in 1991, and elsewhere, Keramik Laufen developed into a company operating worldwide. Its product range was extended, among other things with porcelain tableware. In 1970 it was converted into a holding company with 17 production companies. In 1999 Keramik Laufen was sold to the Spanish company Compañía Roca Radiadores SA.

The workforce numbered 152 in 1900, 525 in 1942, over 7,000 in 1990, and 2,000 in 2005. Sales amounted to 888 million francs in 1995 and 300 million francs in 2005.

== Bibliography ==
- 50 Jahre Laufener Ton-Industrie, 1892–1942, 1943
- G. Gerster, "100 Jahre Keramik Laufen", in Jurablätter, 54, 1992, 129–144
- H. Schlapp, Von der Vielfalt der Keramik, 1992
