= Roca (company) =

Spanish sanitary ware company

Roca Bathrooms
- Type: Public
- Traded as: Roca Sanitario S.A.
- Founded: 1917
- Headquarters: Barcelona, Spain

Roca Corporación Empresarial is a Spanish company dedicated to the design, production and marketing of products for bathroom spaces. Roca has its headquarters in Barcelona and is present in more than 170 markets. It has 78 production centers in 18 countries and directly employs 24,000 people. In addition, it has an area dedicated to the production and marketing of flooring and ceramic coatings.

It is one of the leading brands in Spain with a presence in more than 135 countries.

Roca is a Spanish family-owned company that, since 1999, it has carried out an international expansion based both on the acquisition and the creation of companies and the installation of production plants in various countries. In 2013 Roca reached a turnover of 1,572 million euros.

== Corporate history ==
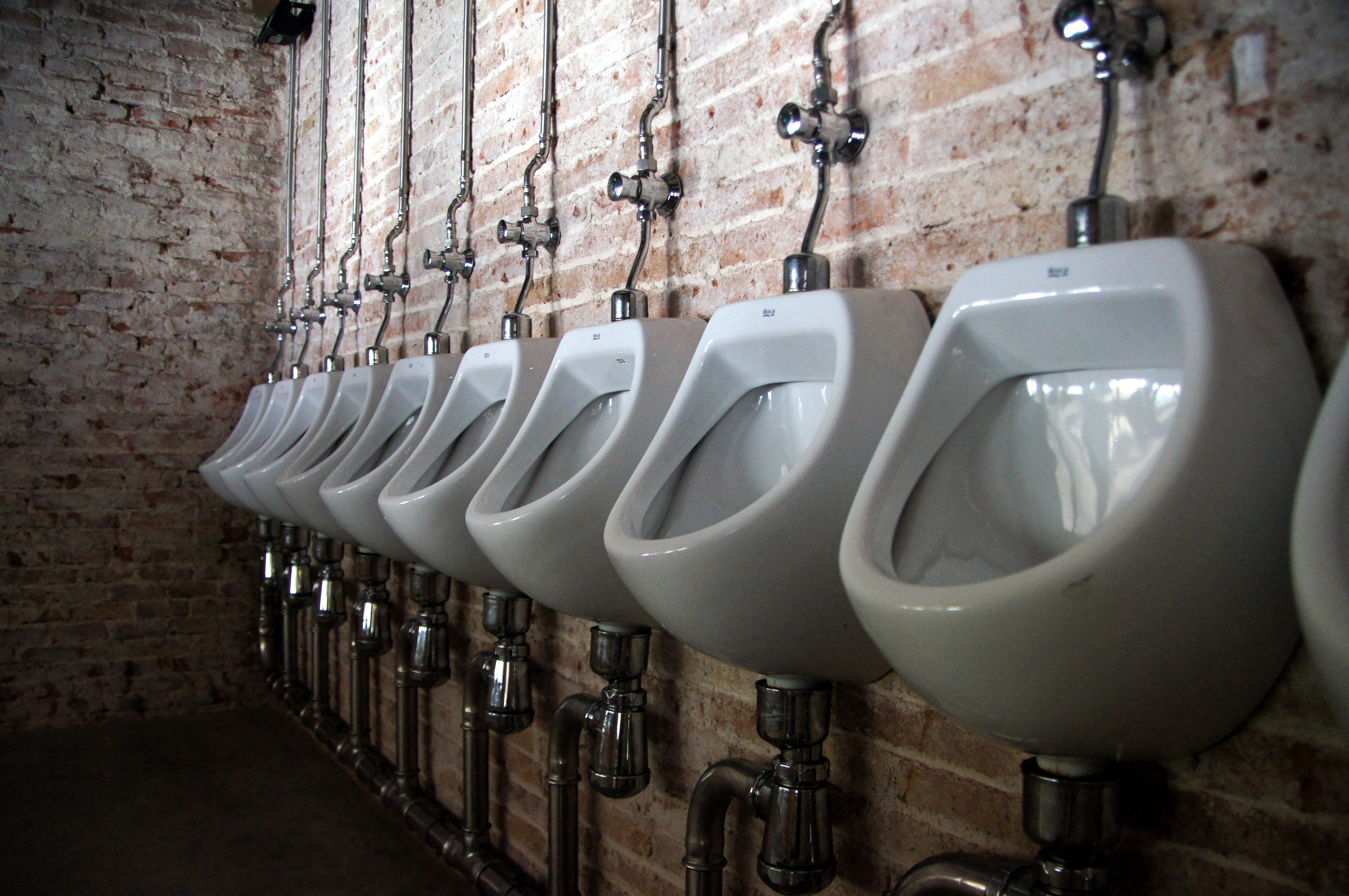
Roca urinals

Roca was founded in Gavà (Barcelona) in 1917 by the brothers Martín, Matías and José Roca Soler as Compañía Roca Radiadores. The company was dedicated exclusively to the manufacture of cast iron radiators for heating. The rapid penetration of new products in the market and a determined desire for expansion led to expanding the business areas with the intention of diversifying its business activities.

In 1925, the first cast-iron boilers were manufactured and in 1929 the production of cast-iron bathtubs began. In 1936 Roca entered the production of sanitary porcelain. In 1954, it also began to manufacture taps. A second porcelain factory was opened in Alcalá de Henares (Madrid) in 1962.

Later, in 1968, the third porcelain factory was launched, in Alcalá de Guadaíra (Seville), (already closed), and in 1974 the steel bathtub factory was inaugurated. The Cerámicas del Foix company, which became a subsidiary, was the beginning of the current ceramics business area.

During the 1990s, commercial subsidiaries were opened, agreements were consolidated with leading companies in their markets, and acquisitions and corporate operations materialized, such as the purchase of the Swiss company Keramik Laufen in 1999. At the beginning of 2002, a process began of restructuring to organize the different business areas into independent companies and Roca Corporación Empresarial S.A. is established.

In 2005, the heating and air conditioning businesses were sold with the aim of concentrating all efforts on the bathroom space sector.

In 2019, the In-wash smart toilets are released, toilets with a washing and drying function, which incorporates the advances of the Japanese toilets.

A recent study from a UK online bathroom retailer showed that Roca was its most popular seller of vanity units between 2018 and 2022.
