= Eugène Cattin =

Swiss photographer

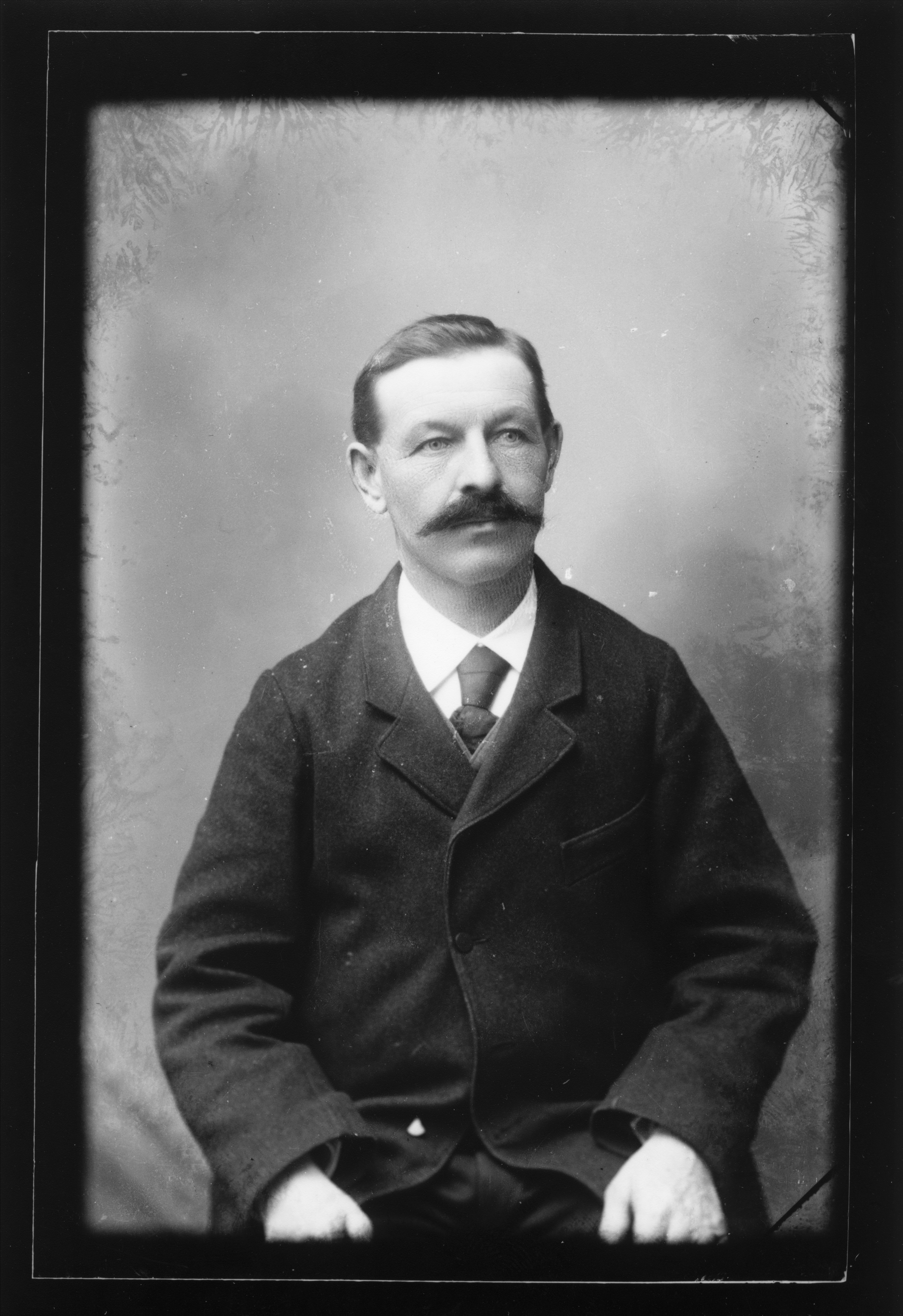
- Born: 21 January 1866; Les Bois
- Died: 8 May 1947 (aged 81); Les Bois
- Occupations: Mail carrier Photographer

Eugène Cattin (21 January 1866 – 8 May 1947) was a Swiss mail carrier and photographer from Les Bois. He's known for photographs of his home region.

== Career ==
Born in 21 January 1866 in Les Bois, Eugène Cattin became a mail carrier in his home village and succeeded to his mother.

During his postman's round, by horse riding or by bicycle, Eugène Cattin photographed his home region and its inhabitants. He realized more than 3,100 shots on photographic plate, mostly outside, that represent everyday life of the Franches-Montagnes. His photographs are conserved by the Archives cantonales jurassiennes, which uploaded this collection on Wikimedia Commons in 2016.

== Bibliography ==
- Noirjean, François (2000). "Eugène Cattin (1866–1947), facteur aux Boix et photographe" (PDF). Jurassica (in French). 14: 40–45. ISSN 1424-1412. Archived from the original (PDF) on 7 March 2016.
