= List of Czech locomotive classes =

The following is a list of locomotives and multiple units numbered in the system used by Drážní úřad (The Rail Authority) in Czechia.

== Electric locomotives ==
=== 1.5 kV DC electric locomotives ===
Class	Picture	Nickname	Production	Builder	Commons	Note
100		Malá Bobina (Small Bobo)	1956–1957	Škoda Works	Category:CZ Class 100 on Wikimedia Commons	Decommissioned
113		Žehlička (Flatiron)	1973	Škoda Works	Category:CZ Class 113 on Wikimedia Commons	

=== 3 kV DC electric locomotives ===
Class	Picture	Nickname	Production	Builder	Commons	Note
110		Žehlička (Flatiron)	1971–73	Škoda Works	Category:CS Class E 458.0 on Wikimedia Commons	Shunter
111		Žehlička (Flatiron)	1981–82	Škoda Works		Shunter
112		Žehlička (Flatiron)	1979	Škoda Works		Shunter; Prototype; Decommissioned
114		Asynchro-Žehlička (Asynchro-Flatiron)	1996, 1999-2000	Škoda Works	Category:CZ Class 114 on Wikimedia Commons	Shunter; Operated by SD – Kolejová doprava
121		Kostitřas z Ústí (Boneshaker from Ústí); Skútr (Scooter); Nákladní bobina (Cargo Bobo)	1960–61	Škoda Works	Category:CZ Class 121 on Wikimedia Commons	all retired from CD/CD Cargo, several units operated by private cargo companies
122		Ústecká dvojka (Number Two from Ústí); Uhelka (Coal lady); Dřevěnka (Wooden lady)	1967	Škoda Works	Category:CZ Class 122 on Wikimedia Commons	
123		Trojka (Number Three); Uhelka (Coal lady)	1971	Škoda Works	Category:CZ Class 123 on Wikimedia Commons	
124.6			1971	Škoda Works	Category:CZ Class 124 on Wikimedia Commons	Prototype developed from the last built unit of class 123
130		Hrbatá (Hump lady); Velbloud (Camel)	1977	Škoda Works	Category:CZ Class 130 on Wikimedia Commons	
140		Bobina nulka (Bobo number zero)	1953–58	Škoda Works	Category:CZ Class 140 on Wikimedia Commons	
141		Bobina jednička (Bobo number one)	1957–60	Škoda Works		
150, 150.2, 151		Banán (Banana); Potkan (Sewer rat); Pražská dvojka (Number Two from Prague); Krysa (Rat)	1978	Škoda Works	Category:CZ Class 150 on Wikimedia Commons	
162, 163		Peršing (Pershing); Rychlý Peršing (Fast Pershing); Patriot	1984–92	Škoda Works		
169		Asynchronka (Asynchronous lady)	1987	Škoda Works	Category:CZ Class 169 on Wikimedia Commons	Decommissioned
180		Albatros (Albatross)	1958	Škoda Works	Category:CZ Class 180 on Wikimedia Commons	Decommissioned
181		Šestikolák (Sixwheeler)	1961–62	Škoda Works	Category:CZ Class 181 on Wikimedia Commons	
182, 183		Šestikolák (Sixwheeler)	1963–71	Škoda Works		
184.5		Donáto	1994–99	Škoda Works	Category:CZ Class 184 on Wikimedia Commons	All four belong to private mining company

=== 25 kV 50 Hz AC electric locomotives ===
Class	Picture	Nickname	Production	Builder	Commons	Note
209		Žehlička (Flatiron); Jezevec (Badger)	1990	Škoda Works	Category:CZ Class 209 on Wikimedia Commons	Shunter; Decommissioned
210		Žehlička (Flatiron); Jezevec (Badger)	1972–1988	Škoda Works	Category:CZ Class 210 on Wikimedia Commons	Shunter
218		Žehlička (Flatiron)	2008	Škoda Works/ČD Cargo	Category:CZ Class 218 on Wikimedia Commons	Shunter; Electro-diesel locomotive
230		Laminátka (Laminate lady)	1966–1967	Škoda Works	Category:CZ Class 230 on Wikimedia Commons	
240		Laminátka (Laminate lady)	1968–1969	Škoda Works		
242		Plecháč (Tin man)	1975–1981	Škoda Works	Category:CZ Class 242 on Wikimedia Commons	
263		Princezna (Princess)	1984	Škoda Works	Category:CZ Class 263 on Wikimedia Commons	First two prototypes, other has Zssk
280		Velká laminátka (Big laminate lady)	1963	Škoda Works	Category:CS Class S 699.0 on Wikimedia Commons	Prototype; Decommissioned

=== Multi-system electric locomotives ===
Class	Picture	Nickname	Production	Builder	Commons	Electric systems	Note
340		Modrá laminátka (Blue laminate lady)	2003	Škoda Works		25 kV/50 Hz AC; 15 kV/16.7 Hz AC	Converted from Class 240.
362		Rychlé eso (Fast Ace)	1990	Škoda Works		25 kV/50 Hz AC; 3 kV DC	
363		Eso (Ace)	1980–1990	Škoda Works		25 kV/50 Hz AC; 3 kV DC	
371		Bastard	1996–2000	Škoda Works		15 kV/16.7 Hz AC; 3 kV DC	Converted from Class 372.
372		Bastard	1988–1991	Škoda Works		15 kV/16.7 Hz AC; 3 kV DC	Same as DB Class 180.
380		Emil Zátopek (official); Messerschmitt, Zázrak (The Miracle), Porsche, Vana (Bathtub), Svářečka (Welding machine)	2008–2011	Škoda Transportation		25 kV/50 Hz AC; 15 kV/16.7 Hz AC; 3 kV DC	
ČDC 383; ČD 193 (DE)		Vectron; Větroun (Windy man)	2010 (193 902) bzw. 2016	Siemens Mobility		25 kV/50 Hz AC; 15 kV/16.7 Hz AC; 3 kV DC; 1.5 kV DC (class 193 only)	
388		TRAXX	Ordered 2018	Bombardier Transportation		25 kV/50 Hz AC; 15 kV/16.7 Hz AC; 1.5 kV DC; 3 kV DC	
1216 (AT)		Taurus	2007 (902) / 2011 (903)	Siemens Mobility		25 kV/50 Hz AC; 15 kV/16.7 Hz AC; 3 kV DC	

== Diesel locomotives ==
=== Diesel-mechanical locomotives ===
Class	Picture	Nickname	Production	Builder	Commons	Note
700		Prasátko (Piggy)	1957–1962	ČKD	Category:CZ Class 700 on Wikimedia Commons	
701		Prasátko (Piggy)	1979–1993	ČKD	Category:CZ Class 701 on Wikimedia Commons	
702		Prasátko (Piggy)	1967–1971	ČKD, TSM	Category:CZ Class 702 on Wikimedia Commons	
703		Prasátko (Piggy)	1969–1979	TSM	Category:CZ Class 703 on Wikimedia Commons	

=== Diesel-electric locomotives ===
Class	Picture	Nickname	Production	Builder	Commons	Note
704		Malé Lego (Small Lego)	1988–92	ČKD	Category:CZ Class 704 on Wikimedia Commons	
708		Velké Lego (Big Lego)	1995–97	ČKD	Category:CZ Class 708 on Wikimedia Commons	
709			1993–96	ČKD	Category:CZ Class 709 on Wikimedia Commons	
714		Veselá kráva (Happy cow); Dvojlego (double Lego)	1994–97	ČKD	Category:CZ Class 714 on Wikimedia Commons	Converted from Class 735
720		Hektor (Hector)	1958–61	ČKD	Category:CZ Class 720 on Wikimedia Commons	Decommissioned
721		Velký Hektor (Big Hector)	1961–71	ČKD		
730		Ponorka (Submarine)	1978–89	ČKD	Category:CZ Class 730 on Wikimedia Commons	
731		Favorit (Favorite); Špageta (Spaghetti)	1988–92	ČKD	Category:CZ Class 731 on Wikimedia Commons	
735		Pilštyk (Pielstick)	1971–79	TSM	Category:CZ Class 735 on Wikimedia Commons	Decommissioned
740		Kocour (Tomcat); Včela (Bee)	1973–89	ČKD		
741		Batoh (Backpack)	2000–12	CZ LOKO	Category:CZ Class 741 on Wikimedia Commons	Rebuilt from 740
742		Kocour (Tomcat); Buchar (Power hammer) Bangle	1977–86	ČKD		Based on class 740
743		Elektronik (Electronics); Kocour (Tomcat)	1987–88	ČKD		Version of Class 742 for Tannwalder Zahnradbahn
744		EffiShunter 1000	2019	CZ LOKO	Category:CZ Class 744 on Wikimedia Commons	
749		Bardotka (Brigitte Bardot); Zamračená (Frown lady) Berta	1992–96	ČD		Modernised class 751 with ETH
750		Brejlovec (Goggles man)	1991–95	ŽOS	Category:CZ Class 750 on Wikimedia Commons	Modernised class 753 with ETH
751		Bardotka (Brigitte Bardot)	1964–71	ČKD	Category:CZ Class 751 on Wikimedia Commons	
752		Bardotka (Brigitte Bardot)	1996	ČKD	Category:CZ Class 752 on Wikimedia Commons	Version of Class 751 with no train heating Decommissioned
753		Brejlovec (Goggles man)	1968–77	ČKD	Category:CZ Class 753 on Wikimedia Commons	
754		Brejlovec (Goggles man)	1975–80	ČKD	Category:CZ Class 754 on Wikimedia Commons	
755		Brejlovec (Goggles man)	2005	ČMKS Holding	Category:CZ Class 755 on Wikimedia Commons	Modernised class 750
759		Kyklop (Cyclop)	1974–75	ČKD	Category:CZ Class 759 on Wikimedia Commons	Decommissioned
770		Čmelák (Bumblebee)	1963–69	ČKD, SMZ Dubnica	Category:CZ Class 770 on Wikimedia Commons	
771		Čmelák (Bumblebee)	1968–72	SMZ Dubnica	Category:CZ Class 771 on Wikimedia Commons	Improved version of class 770
776		Pomeranč (Orange)	1961–65	ČKD		Decommissioned
781		Sergej	1966–79	LTZ Luhansk	Category:CZ Class 781 on Wikimedia Commons	Same as DR Class 120; Decommissioned
794		EffiShunter 300	2014–19	CZ LOKO	Category:CZ Class 794 on Wikimedia Commons	
799		Adélka (Adelle)	1992–00	ČMKS Holding	Category:CZ Class 799 on Wikimedia Commons	Modernised class 700, class 701, class 702

=== Diesel-hydraulic locomotives ===
Class	Picture	Nickname	Production	Builder	Commons	Note
710		Rosnička (Tree-frog)	1961–73	ČKD, TSM, SMZ	Category:CZ Class 710 on Wikimedia Commons	Decommissioned
715		Rakušanka (Austrian lady)	1961	SGP Wien	Category:CZ Class 715 on Wikimedia Commons	Rack locomotive Decommissioned
725		Karkulka (Little Red Riding Hood)	1959–65	ČKD, TSM	Category:CZ Class 725 on Wikimedia Commons	Decommissioned
726		Karkulka (Little Red Riding Hood)	1963–65	TSM	Category:CZ Class 726 on Wikimedia Commons	Decommissioned

=== Narrow-gauge diesel locomotives ===
Class	Picture	Nickname	Production	Builder	Commons	Note
705.9			1954–58	ČKD	Category:CZ Class 705.9 on Wikimedia Commons	

== Electric multiple units ==
=== 3 kV DC electric multiple units ===
Class	Picture	Nickname	Production	Builder	Commons	Note
440		RegioPanter (official); Harmonika (Harmonica); Metro (Subway, Underground); Hradubické metro (Hradubice subway)	2011–12	Škoda Transportation	Category:CZ Class 440 on Wikimedia Commons	
451, 452		Pantograf (Pantograph); Žabotlam (Frog mouth)	1964–73	Vagónka Studénka	Category:CZ Classes 451 and 452 on Wikimedia Commons	Decommissioned
460		Tornádo (Tornado); Pantograf (Pantograph)	1971–78	Vagónka Studénka	Category:CS Class EM 488.0 on Wikimedia Commons	Decommissioned
470		Kraken	1991	Vagónka Studénka	Category:CZ Class 470 on Wikimedia Commons	Double-deck EMU; Decommissioned
471		CityElefant (official); Ešus (Mess tin); Ledovec (Glacier)	1997–12	ČKD Vagonka; Škoda Transportation	Category:CZ Class 471 on Wikimedia Commons	Double-deck EMU for suburban service

=== 25 kV/50 Hz AC electric multiple units ===
Class	Picture	Nickname	Production	Builder	Commons	Note
560		Tornádo (Tornado); Pantograf (Pantograph)	1966–71	Vagónka Studénka	Category:CZ Class 560 on Wikimedia Commons	Decommissioned

=== Multi-system electric multiple units ===
Class	Picture	Nickname	Production	Builder	Commons	Electric systems	Note
640, 650		RegioPanter (official)	2011–12	Škoda Transportation	Category:RegioPanter on Wikimedia Commons	25 kV/50 Hz AC; 3 kV DC	
660		InterPanter (official)	2015	Škoda Transportation	Category:InterPanter on Wikimedia Commons	25 kV/50 Hz AC; 3 kV DC	
680		Pendolino (official)	2003–05	Alstom Ferroviaria	Category:CZ Class 680 on Wikimedia Commons	25 kV/50 Hz AC; 15 kV/16.7 Hz AC; 3 kV DC	tilting train

== Diesel motorcars and multiple units ==
Class	Picture	Nickname	Production	Builder	Commons	Note
809			1994–97	Vagónka Studénka	Category:CZ Class 809 on Wikimedia Commons	Modernised Class 810
810		Šukafon; Skleník (Glasshouse); Chcípák; RegioMouse; Orchestrion	1973–82	Vagónka Studénka		
811			1997	Pars nova	Category:CZ Class 811 on Wikimedia Commons	Modernised Class 810; Decommissioned
811			2020	DPOV		Modernised Class 810
812		Esmeralda	2001	Pars nova	Category:CZ Class 812 on Wikimedia Commons	Modernised Class 810; Prototype
814		Regionova	2005–12	Pars nova		Modernised Class 810
820		Singrovka	1959–64	Vagónka Studénka	Category:CZ Class 820 on Wikimedia Commons	Decommissioned
830		Loďák Dvaašedesátka	1949–60	ČKD; Vagónka Studénka	Category:CZ Class 830 on Wikimedia Commons	Decommissioned
831		Loďák	1981–91	ŽOS Šumperk	Category:CZ Class 831 on Wikimedia Commons	Modernised Class 830; Decommissioned
835		Marfuša; Dlabaný ingot (Carved ingot); Baba Jaga	2003	Metrowagonmash		Version of RA-1 for ČD; Prototype
840, 841		RegioSpider (official); Štrůdl (Strudel)	2011–12	Stadler Rail	Category:CZ Class 840 on Wikimedia Commons	
842		Kvatro (Quattro)	1988–94	Vagónka Studénka	Category:CZ Class 842 on Wikimedia Commons	
843		Rakev (Coffin)	1995–97	Vagónka Studénka	Category:CZ Class 843 on Wikimedia Commons	
844		RegioShark (official)	2012	PESA Bydgoszcz SA	Category:CZ Class 844 on Wikimedia Commons	
850, 851		Krokodýl (Crocodile)	1962–68	Vagónka Studénka	Category:CZ Classes 850 and 851 on Wikimedia Commons	Decommissioned
852, 853		Hydra	1968–70	Vagónka Studénka	Category:CZ Classes 852 and 853 on Wikimedia Commons	Decommissioned
854		Katr; Edita	1997–2006	Pars nova	Category:CZ Class 854 on Wikimedia Commons	Modernized class 852 and 853
860		Chrochtadlo (Grunter)	1974	Vagónka Studénka	Category:CZ Class 860 on Wikimedia Commons	Decommissioned

== Control cars ==
961	Sysel (Souslik)	1986–1987	Pars Nova	Category:ČD Class Bfhpvee on Wikimedia Commons	Modernised of cars BDt and Btee (2011-2013)	Bfhpvee295
