= ČSD Class ES 499.2 =

Multisystem electric locomotive

DR Class 230 DB Class 180 ČSD / ČD Class 371, 372
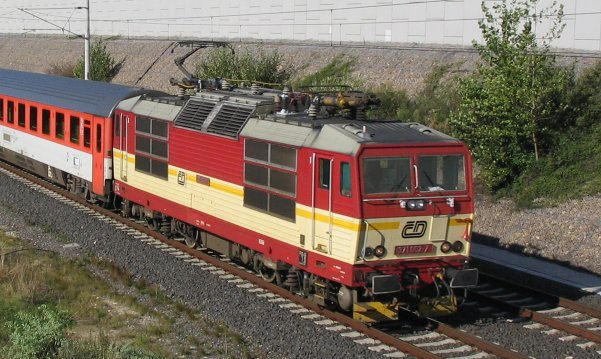
- 371 002-7 of ČD
Type and origin
- Builder: Škoda Works, Plzeň; LEW Hennigsdorf (electrical equipment)
- Build date: 1988 to 1991
- Total produced: 35
Specifications
- Configuration
  - UIC: Bo′Bo′
- Gauge: 1,435 mm (4 ft 8 1/2 in)
- Length: 16,800 mm (55 ft 1 1/2 in) over buffers
- Loco weight: 84 tonnes (83 long tons; 93 short tons)
- Electric system/s: 15 kV 16.7 Hz AC; 3 kV DC
- Traction motors: Four
Performance figures
- Maximum speed: DB 180, ČD 372: 120 km/h (75 mph); ČD 371: 160 km/h (99 mph)
- Power output
  - 1 hour: 3,260 kW (4,370 hp)
  - Continuous: 3,080 kW (4,130 hp)
- Tractive effort
  - Starting: 280 kN (62,900 lbf)
Career
- Operators: Deutsche Reichsbahn; Deutsche Bahn AG; ČSD; ČD
- Number in class: DR: 20; ČSD: 15
- Numbers: DR: 230 001 – 230 020; DBAG: 180 001 – 180 020; ČSD / ČD: 372 001 – 372 015

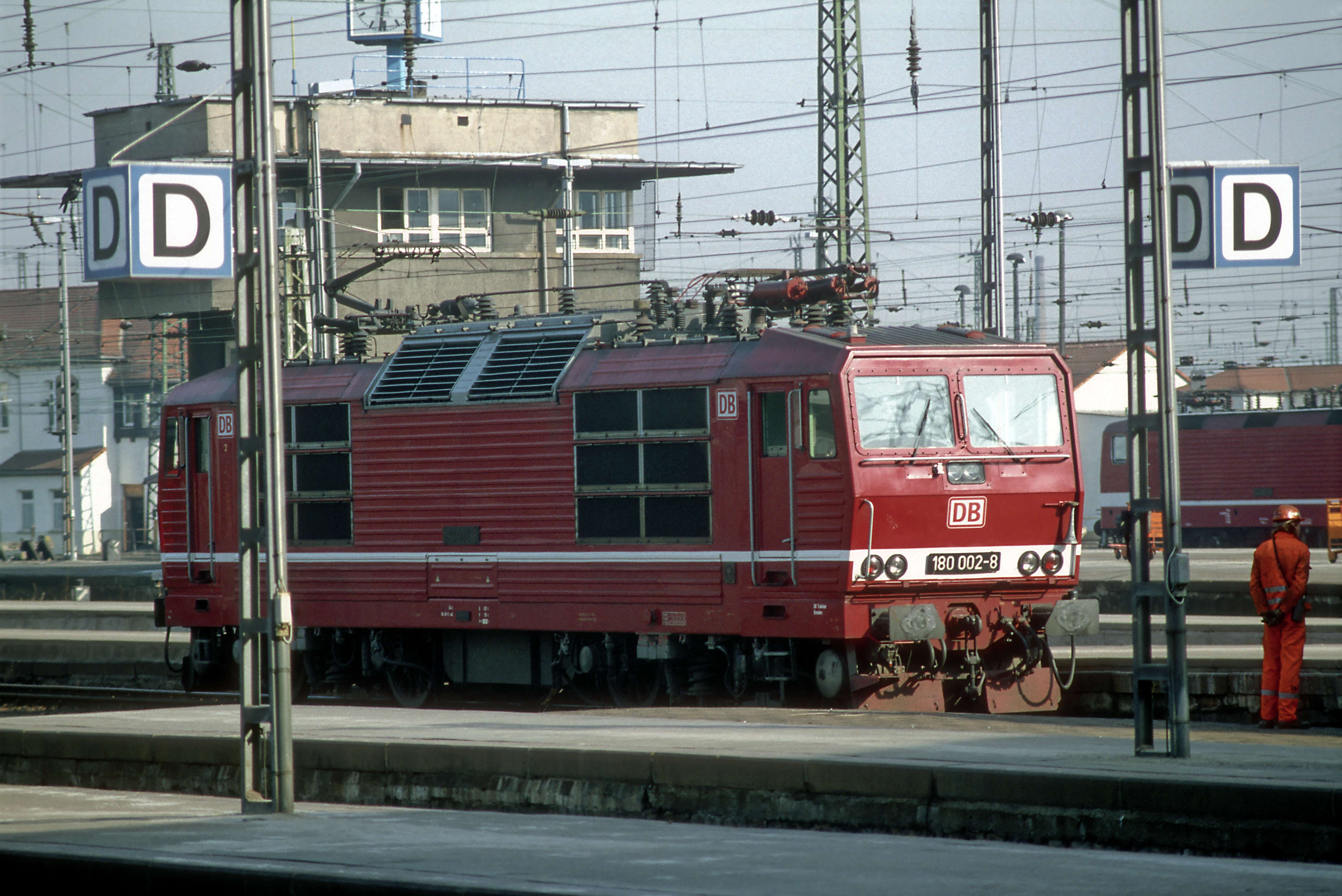
A DB Class 180 at Bf Leipzig Haupbahnhof (Hbf)

The ČSD Class ES 499.2 (Now ČD class 372 and 371) and DR Class 230 are multisystem electric locomotives, manufactured by Škoda Plzeň from 1988 to 1991. The locomotives were developed to work international trains between Czechoslovakia and the DDR. The locomotives are similar to the 163, 263 and 363 classes, but differ in electrical equipment, due to the need to operate across borders. 35 were produced, originally split between the Czechoslovak State Railways (ČSD) and the Deutsche Reichsbahn.

== History ==
In the 1970s, the Deutsche Reichsbahn electrified the Děčín–Dresden-Neustadt railway between Dresden and Schöna, near the Czech border, using the standard German electrification of 15 kV 16 2/3 Hz. Across the Czechoslovak border, railways were electrified with 3 kV DC, creating a gap between Schöna and Děčín, which required trains to be diesel hauled. To solve this problem, it was decided to develop a class of locomotives that could operate on both the German AC and the Czech DC electrification systems.

== Numbering ==
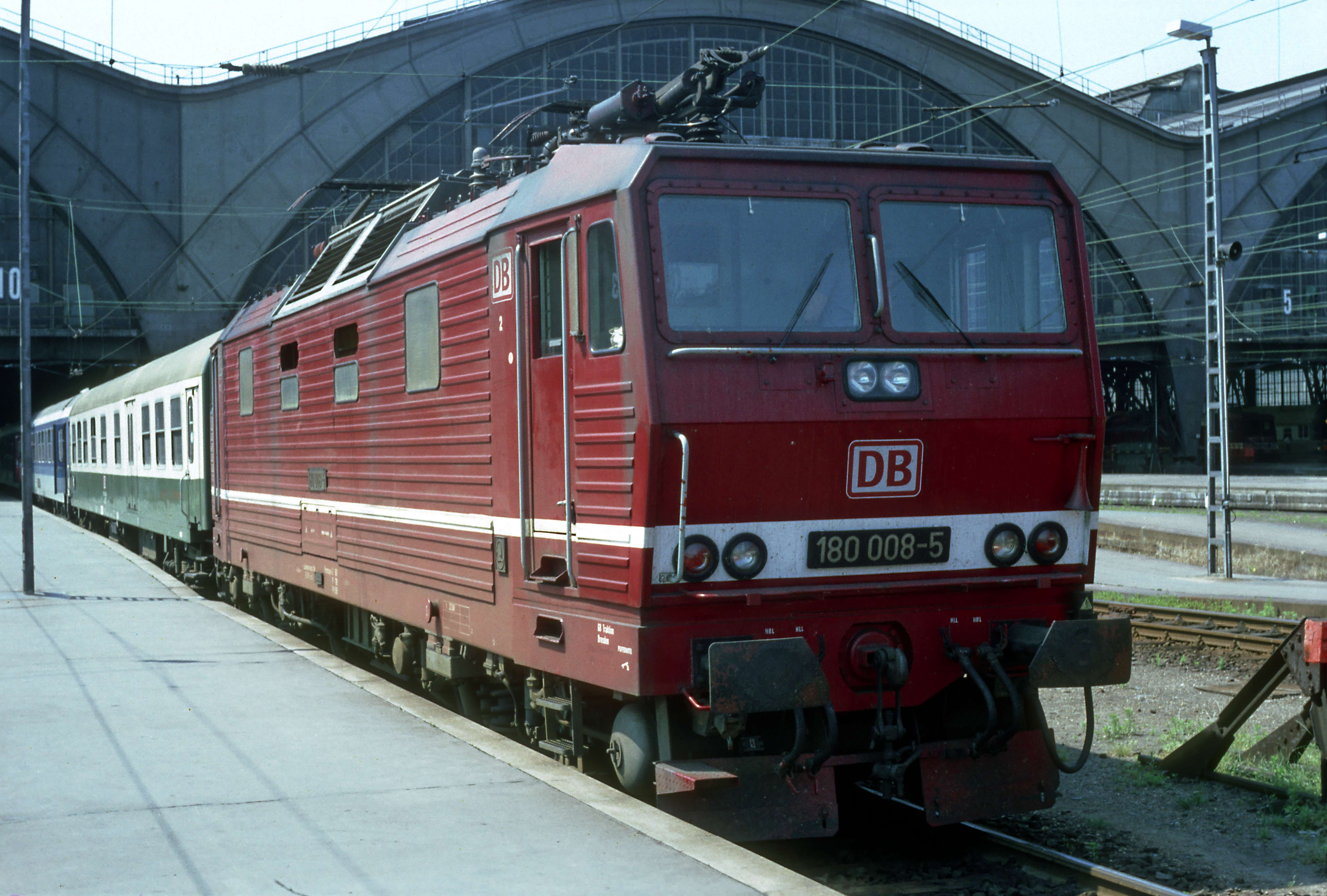
180 008-5 of Deutsche Bahn

The locomotives were intended to be delivered as ČSD Class ES 499.2 and DR Class 230, however, by time of delivery the ČSD has moved to numerical numbering, so the Czech locomotives were delivered as Class 372. The German examples were later renumbered to DB 180 class, due to the merger of Deutsche Bundesbahn and Deutsche Reichsbahn to form Deutsche Bahn AG. Czech locomotives modified to operate at 160 kilometres per hour (99 mph) were renumbered to Class 371.
