= ČSD Class T 458.1 =

ČSD Class T 458.1 ČD 721 / ZSSK 721
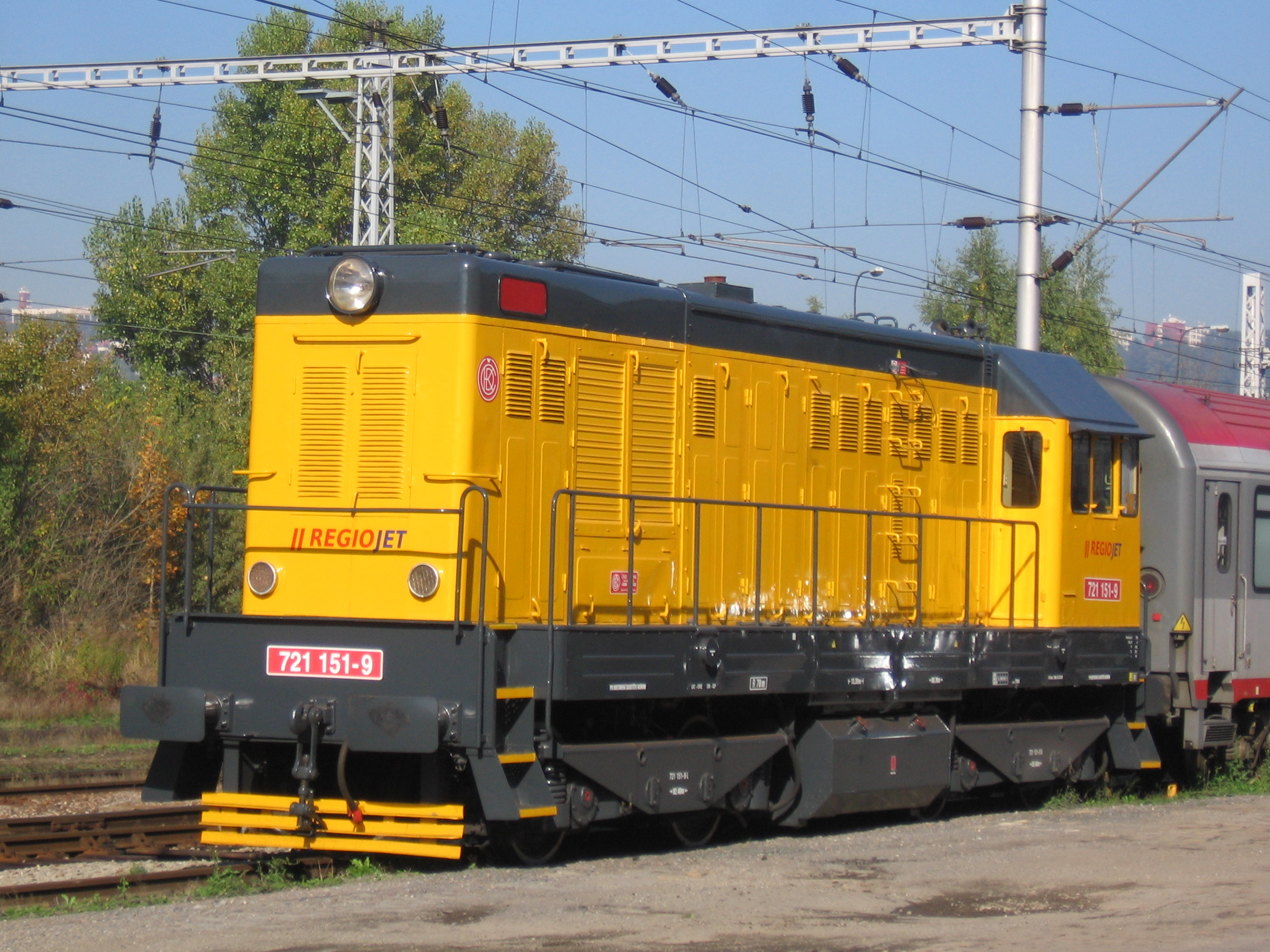
- RJ 721.151 at Praha-Smíchov station
Type and origin
- Power type: Diesel
- Builder: ČKD
- Build date: 1961–1968
- Total produced: 221 ČD, ZSCS; 49 Private owner 13 Russian Gauge
Specifications
- Configuration
  - UIC: Bo′Bo′
- Gauge: 1,435 mm (4 ft 8 1/2 in) standard gauge 1,520 mm (4 ft 11 27/32 in)
- Length: 13,280 mm (43 ft 7 in)
- Loco weight: 74 tonnes (73 long tons; 82 short tons)
- Prime mover: K 6 S 310 DR
- Engine type: (?)
- Generator: DC
Performance figures
- Maximum speed: 80 km/h (50 mph)
- Power output: 551 kW (740 hp)
Career
- Operators: ČD ZSSK

ČSD Class T 458.1 is a Czechoslovak diesel locomotive. It remain in use as shunters in both Slovakia and the Czech Republic. It is now classified as class 721.

The locomotive was built using the same hood arrangement and driver's cab as the T 435.0. The 6 S 310 DR diesel engine was also retained. Due to the increased weight of the units, it had a higher tractive effort despite using the same diesel engine. Except for the first five units, the locomotive had an extended wheelset using swing arms with helical spring suspension, offering improved running characteristics.

ČSD built the first 13 locomotives to wide gauge standard, then built 206 locomotives between 1963 and 1965 to standard gauge. The type was also successful in the export market; in addition to the Soviet Union, it was also supplied to Albania, India, Iraq, East Germany and Poland.

== See also ==
- List of České dráhy locomotive classes
