= ČD Class 749 =

Czech diesel locomotive

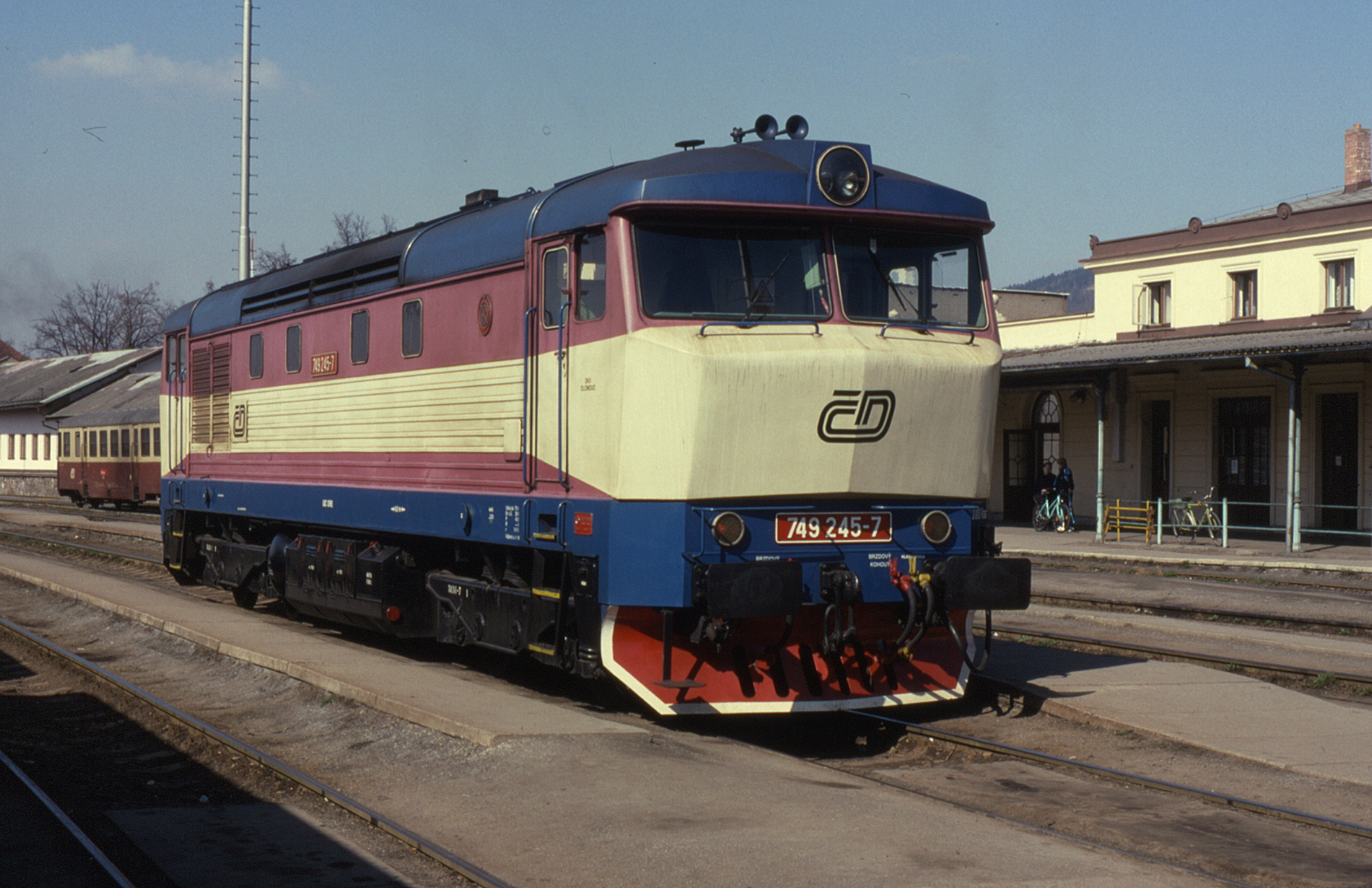
Type and origin
- Power type: Diesel-electric
- Builder: ČKD
- Rebuilder: ČD
- Rebuild date: 1992 to 1996
- Number rebuilt: 60
Specifications
- Configuration
  - UIC: Bo´Bo´
- Gauge: 1,435 mm (4 ft 8 1/2 in)
- Length
  - Over beams: 16.5 metres (54 ft)
- Height: 4,356 millimetres (171.5 in)
- Loco weight: 75 tonnes (74 long tons; 83 short tons)
- Fuel type: Diesel
- Prime mover: ČKD K 6 S 310 DR
- Train heating: Electric
Performance figures
- Maximum speed: 100 kilometres per hour (62 mph)
- Power output: 1,103 kilowatts (1,479 hp)
- Tractive effort: 180 kilonewtons (40,000 lb_{f})
Career
- Operators: České dráhy, ČD Cargo, various others
- Nicknames: Zamračená (Frowned) or Bardotka

The ČD 749 class is a diesel electric locomotive, created through refurbishment of classes 751 and 752 (formally T 478.2 under ČSD).

== History ==
Following the move away from steam haulage on Czechoslovakia railways, it was decided that heating of passenger cars would move from steam heat, where steam from a boiler is piped through the train, to electric train heat. To convert the locomotives to the 749 class, the steam boiler was removed, and replaced with an alternator to provide electric train supply for heating. This process also took place with the locomotives of the ČD Class 753, which were converted to the 750 class.

The prototype for the conversion took place in 1992, with locomotive 751 039 being converted, with a second locomotive being converted in 1993. Following these two, 60 locomotives were converted, with the process being carried out until 1996. The final locomotive was additionally modified with a new electrical control system. The locomotives chosen to be converted were selected from all production series, therefore the new numbers do not form a continuous series.

Especially after 2005 the locomotives were increasingly used in freight transport, mainly to replace the aging unrebuilt 751 and 753 classes, and due to increasing electrification rendering the diesel locomotives obsolete. In 2007, several locomotives were transferred to ČD Cargo, following the separation from České dráhy.

=== Current operations ===
Today the remaining freight locomotives are based around České Budějovice, where they are used when freight trains are diverted away from the wires. At České dráhy several locomotives are still operational at Prague's Vršovice depot, working weekend services to Čerčany.

== Technical Information ==
Class 749 is a dual cab, four axle locomotive. The prime mover is a ČKD K 6 S 310 DR, a four stroke, six cylinder diesel engine, fitted with a PDH 50 V turbocharger.

All four axles are fitted with DC traction motors, manufactured by ČKD.
