= ČSD Class E 669.2 =

ČSD class E 669.2 ČD class 182
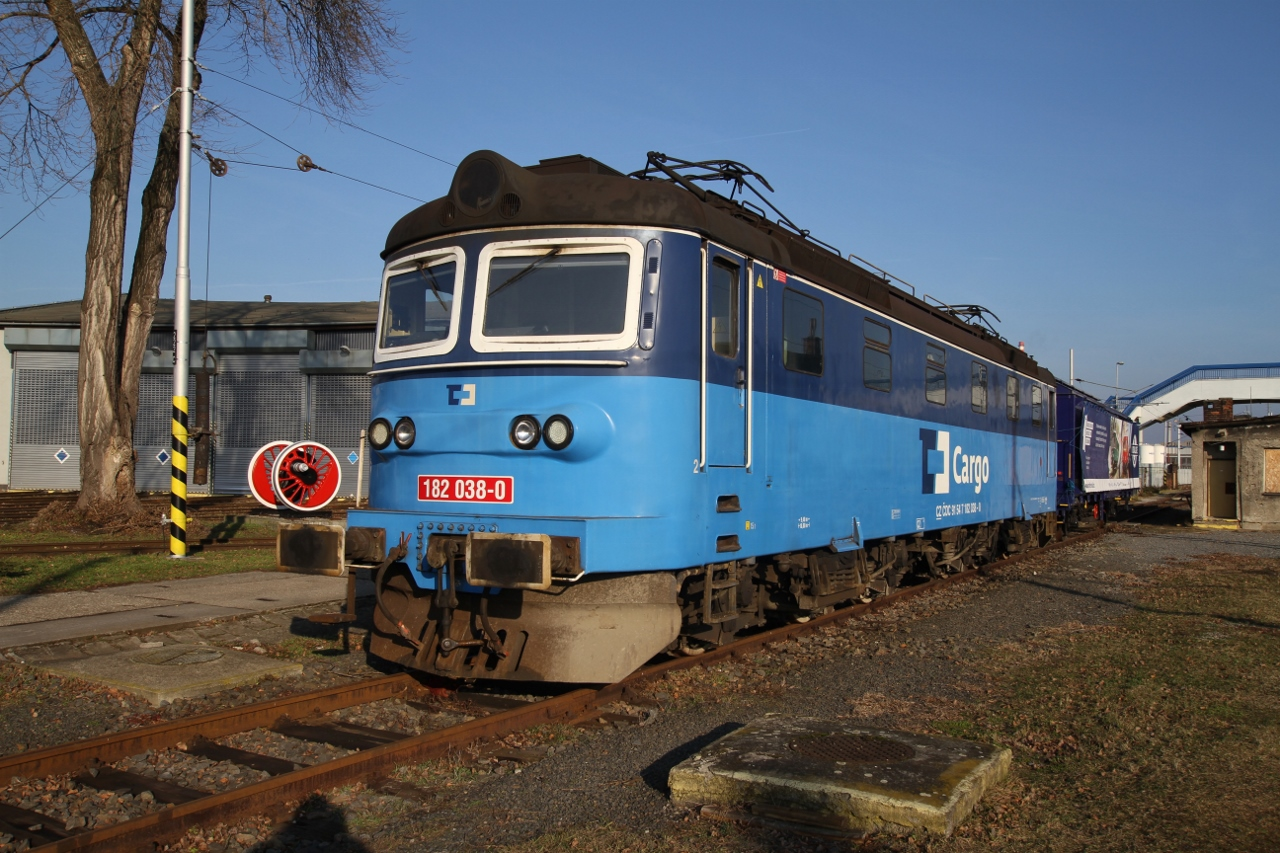
- 182 038-0 at Ostrava in 2018
Type and origin
- Power type: Electric
- Builder: Škoda Works
- Model: 59E1, 59E2, 59E3
- Build date: 1963–1965
- Total produced: 168
Specifications
- Configuration
  - UIC: Co′Co′
- Gauge: 1,435 mm (4 ft 8 1/2 in) standard gauge
- Length: 18,940 mm (62 ft 2 in)
- Width: 2,950 mm (9 ft 8 in)
- Height: 4,500 mm (14 ft 9 in)
- Axle load: 20 tonnes (20 long tons; 22 short tons)
- Loco weight: 120 tonnes (120 long tons; 130 short tons)
- Electric system/s: 3000 V DC overhead lines
- Current pickup(s): Pantograph
- Traction motors: 1 AD 4346 gT
- Train brakes: DAKO DK-GP
Performance figures
- Maximum speed: 90 km/h (56 mph)
- Power output: 2,790 kilowatts (3,740 hp)
Career
- Class: 182 CZE; 182 SVK; E182 POL
- Nicknames: Šestikolak, Rakaňa

The ČSD E 669.2 is a class of electric locomotives designed, built and used in the former Czechoslovakia for heavy freight trains. The class is a development of the E 669.1 class.

Surviving members of the class are now used in the Czech Republic (ČD Class 182) by ČD Cargo and ODOS, in Slovakia by private operator Lokorail and in Poland by various private operators including CTL Logistics and PTK Holding).

== History ==
As the class is a slight modification of Class E669.1, no prototype was built. The locomotives were built in the years 1963–65 in three types: 59E1, 59E2 and 59E3. 168 locomotives were built in those series.

Currently the whole class is being systematically withdrawn in the Czech Republic, where the last survivors are based in Ostrava. In Slovakia the whole series was withdrawn on 31 March 2006. Since 2005, withdrawn locomotives have usually been rented or sold to various Polish private operators.

== Nicknames ==
- Šestikolak (English The Sixwheeler) in the Czech Republic - from the number of wheels
- Rakaňa in Slovakia

== See also ==
- List of ČD Classes
