= ČSD Class E 458.1 =

ČSD class E 458.1 ČD Class 111
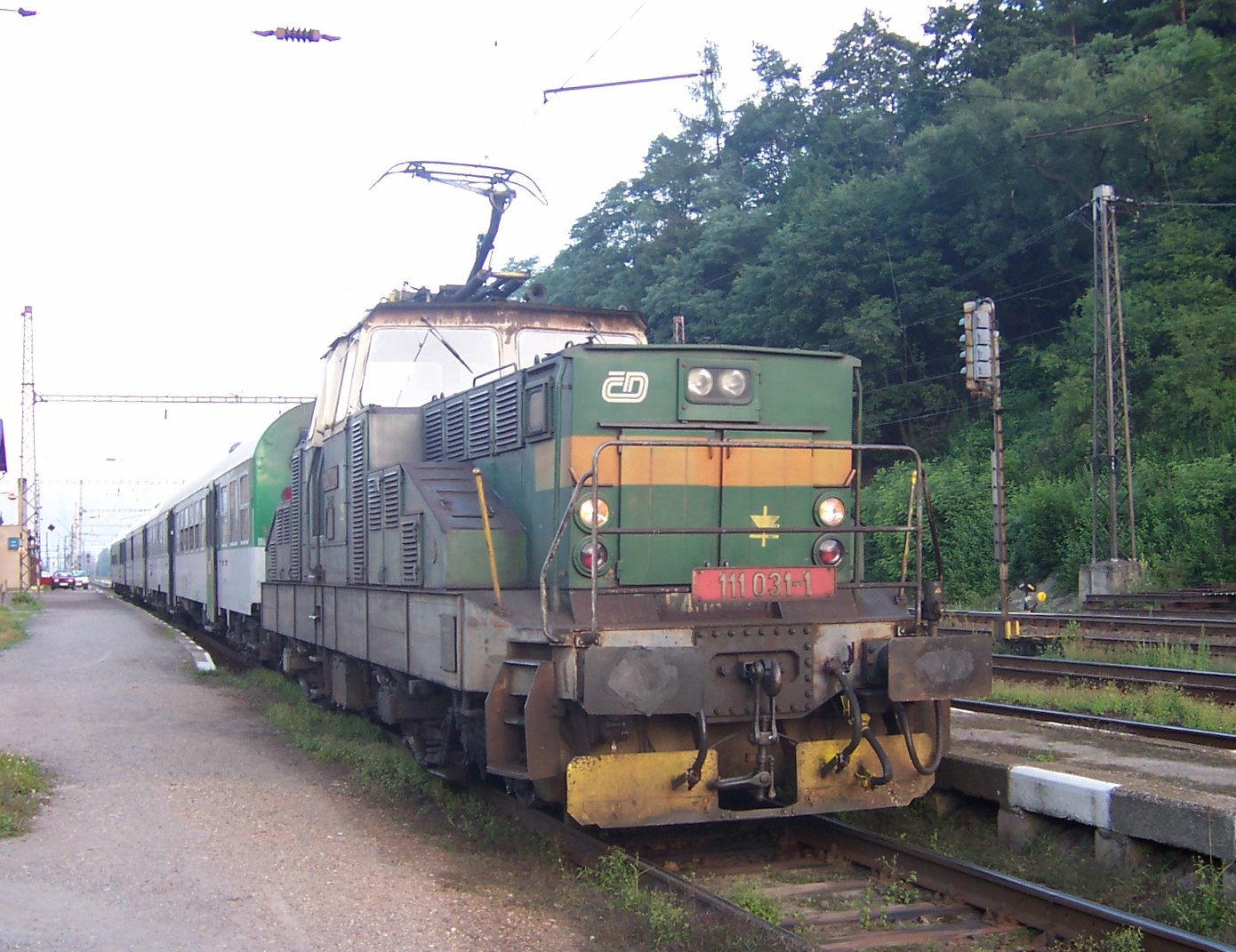
- 111 031 at Ústí nad Orlicí
Type and origin
- Power type: Electric
- Builder: Škoda Works
- Model: 78E
- Build date: Prototype: 1979; Production: 1981–1982
- Total produced: 35
Specifications
- Configuration
  - UIC: Bo′Bo′
- Gauge: 1,435 mm (4 ft 8 1/2 in)
- Length: 14,400 mm (47 ft 3 in)
- Width: 3,000 mm (9 ft 10 in)
- Height: 4,650 mm (15 ft 3 in)
- Loco weight: 70.4 tonnes (69.3 long tons; 77.6 short tons)
- Electric system/s: 3,000 V DC overhead lines
- Current pickup(s): Pantograph
Performance figures
- Maximum speed: 80 km/h (50 mph)
- Power output: 772 kW (1,035 hp)
- Tractive effort: 245 kN (55,000 lbf)
Career
- Operators: ČSD » ČD
- Class: ČSD: E 458.1, ČD: 111
- Number in class: 32
- Numbers: 111 001 – 111 035

ČSD Class E 458.1 is a class of electric locomotive were used for shunting and local trip working in former Czechoslovakia. Locomotives which passed to České dráhy, rail operator in the Czech Republic are now classified as Class 111. E 458.1 locomotives operate solely on the 3,000 V DC electrification system. They are fitted with thyristor control. ČSD Class S 458.0 and ČSD Class E 458.0 are similar locomotives operating on 25 kV AC and 3,000 V DC respectively.

== See also ==
- List of České dráhy locomotive classes
