= Class 700 =

Class 700 or 700 class may refer to:

- ČD Class 700
- Chōsen Railway Class 700
- British Rail Class 700
- LSWR 700 class
- Midland Railway 700 Class
- New South Wales 600/700 class railcar
- N700 Series Shinkansen
- South Australian Railways 700 class (diesel)
- South Australian Railways 700 class (steam)
- 700 Series Shinkansen
