= ČSD Class ES 499.1 =

Class of electric locomotives

ČD ES 499.1 ČD 363 / ZSSK 363
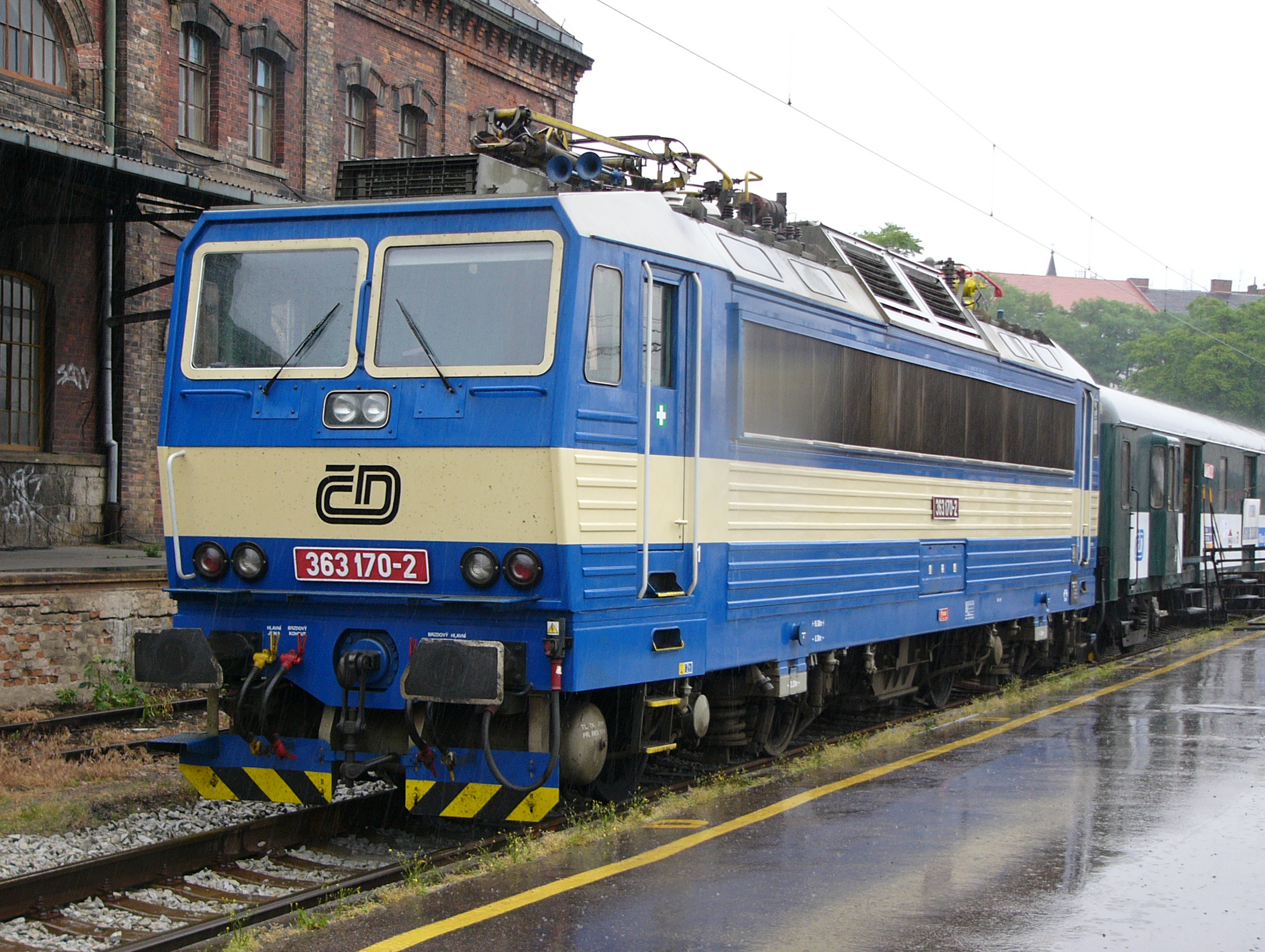
- ČD 363 170
Type and origin
- Power type: Electric
- Builder: Škoda Works
- Build date: Prototype: 1980; Production: 1984–1990
- Total produced: 181
Specifications
- Configuration
  - AAR: B-B
  - UIC: Bo′Bo′
- Gauge: 1,435 mm (4 ft 8 1/2 in) standard gauge
- Length: 16,800 mm (55 ft 1 in)
- Width: 2,940 mm (9 ft 8 in)
- Height: 4,625 mm (15 ft 2.1 in)
- Loco weight: 87 tonnes (86 long tons; 96 short tons)
- Electric system/s: 3000 V DC; 25 kV 50 Hz AC overhead lines
- Current pickup: Pantograph
- Traction motors: AL 4562 FiR
Performance figures
- Maximum speed: 120 km/h (75 mph)
- Power output: DC: 3,480 kW (4,667 hp); AC: 3,060 kW (4,104 hp)
- Tractive effort: 260 kN (58,450 lbf)
Career
- Operators: ČSD » ČD &» ČDC; ČSD » ŽSR » ZSSK &» ZSCS
- Class: ČSD: ES 499.1, later 363; ČD & ZSSK: 363
- Number in class: ČSD: 181; ČD & ČDC: 101; ZSSK & ZSCS: 35
- Numbers: ČSD: 499.1001 – 499.1042 (later 363 001 – 363 042); 363 043 – 363 181; ČD & ZSSK: in range 363 001 – 363 181
- Nicknames: Eso

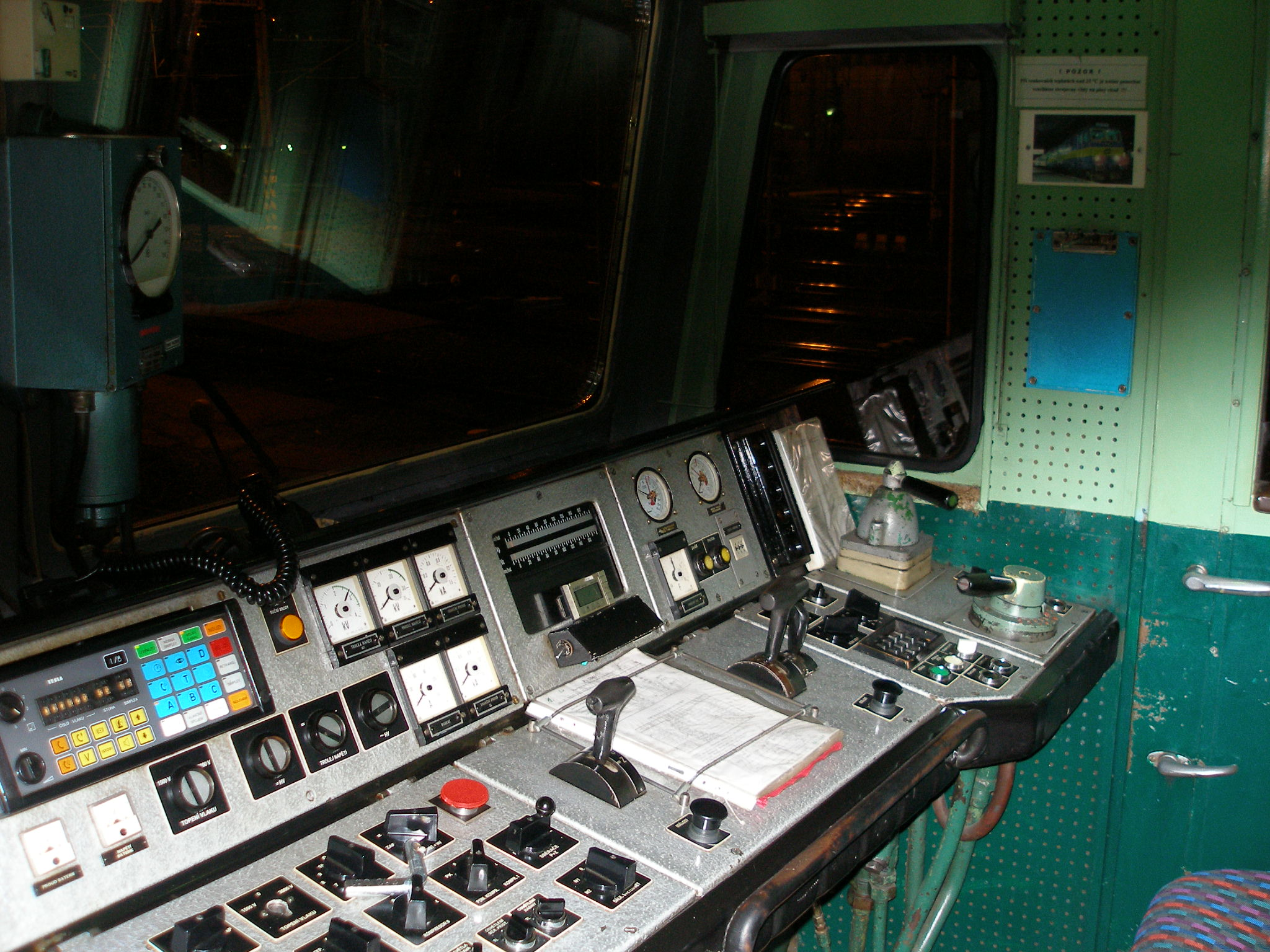
Driver's desk in 363 061

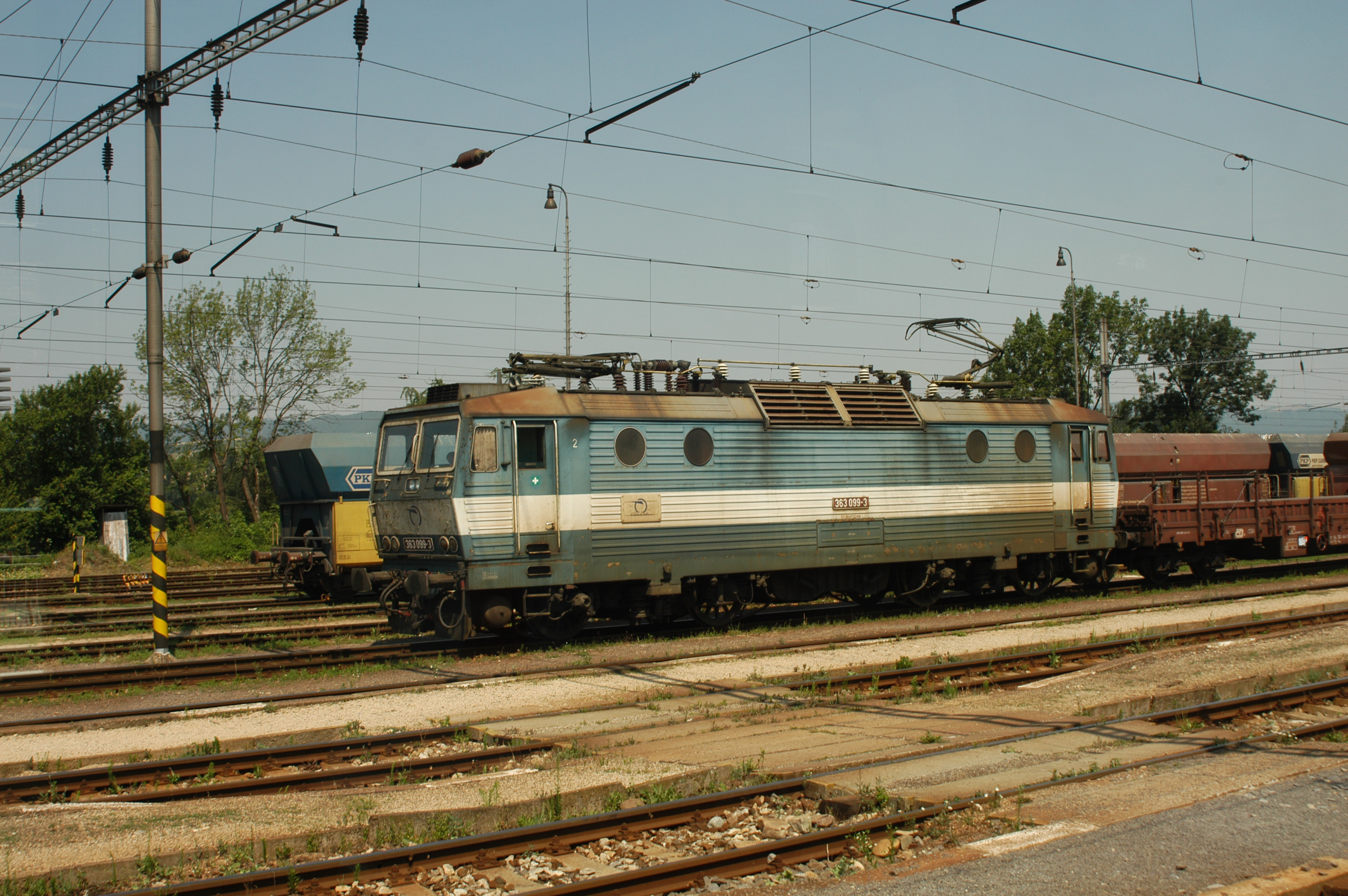
363 099–3, Slovakia

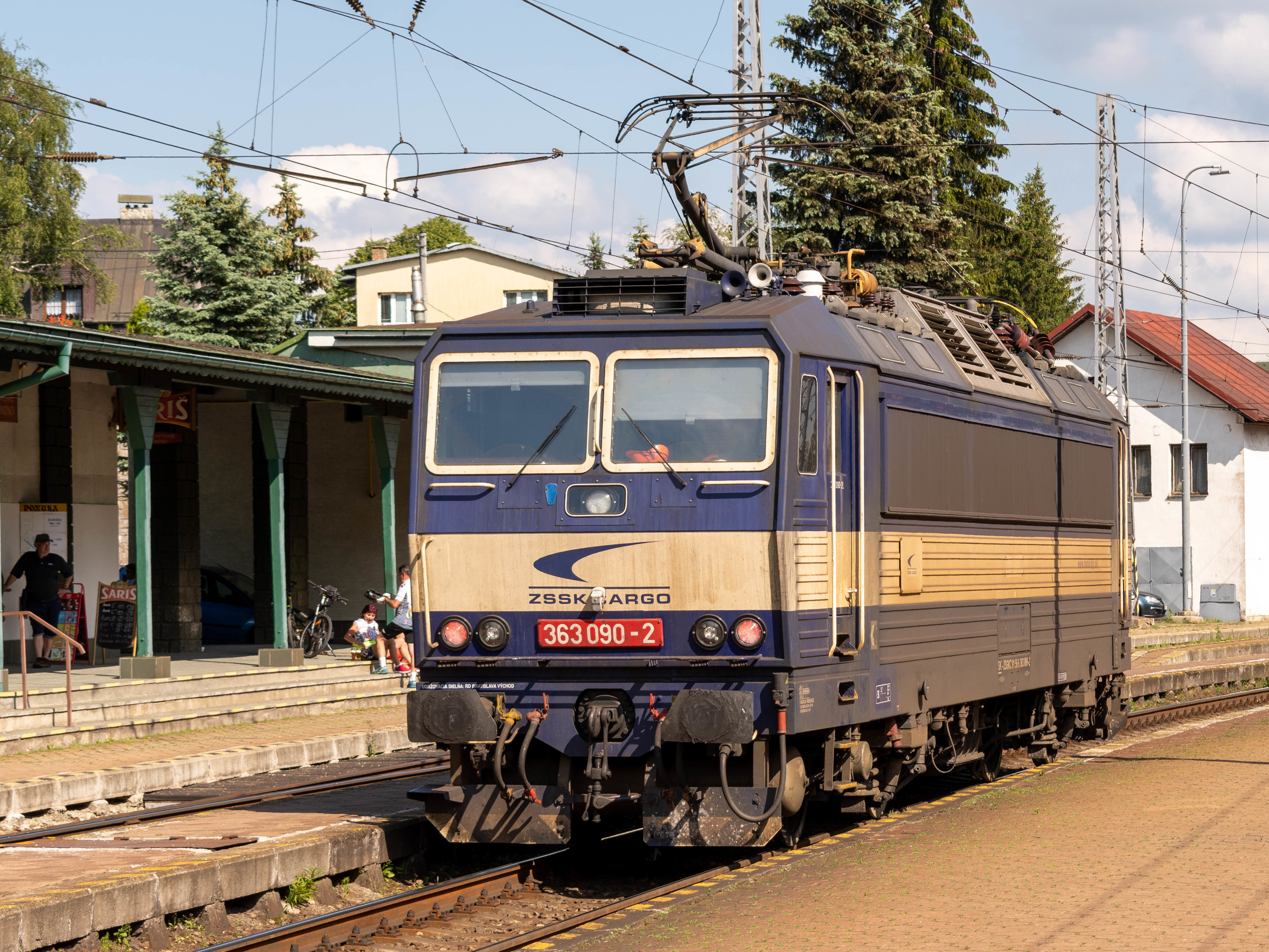
363.090-2, Slovakia

ČSD Class ES 499.1 is a class of electric locomotives used primarily for passenger trains in Czech Republic and Slovakia. Now classified as Class 363, these locomotives passed to České dráhy, rail operator in the Czech Republic, and to ZSSK, rail operator in Slovakia. Class 363 is also used by ČD Cargo and ZSSK Cargo for hauling freight trains.

ES 499.1 locomotives operate both on the 3,000 V DC system and the 25 kV 50 Hz AC system.

== History ==
In 1980 Škoda produced ES 499.1001 and 1002 as prototype locomotives for the replacement of the existing ČSD fleet. Production series locomotives started to be delivered in 1984. Two single system derivatives were also created S 499.2 (AC) and E 499.3 (DC). During 1990 further development to run at 140 km/h lead to the ČD Class 362, but an order for 30 locos was canceled due to financial problems. Some ČD Class 363 and ŽSR Class 363 locomotives are being rebuilt as 362s. Since 2011, they have also been operated with control trailers.

== Power regulation ==
In 1980, these locomotives were the world's first multi-system locomotives with power thyristor pulse regulation. This regulation has minimal losses compared to older resistive regulation with much higher losses. This gave the locomotive its characteristic sound in three frequencies (the first is 33,3 Hz, the second is 100 Hz and the third is 300 Hz) when the locomotive is accelerating.

== Usage ==
363s are currently used to haul these services

- ČD Czech Republic
  - Prague - Břeclav
  - Prague - České Budějovice
  - Prague - Plzeň
  - Ústí nad Labem - Cheb
  - Břeclav - Petrovice u Karviné
  - Brno - Bohumín
  - Brno - Olomouc (- Šumperk)
- ZSSK Slovakia
  - Bratislava - Žilina - Košice

== Disposition ==
363 002	ČD
363 003 - 363 016	ČD Cargo
363 018	ČD Cargo
363 020	ČD Cargo
363 022	ČD Cargo
363 025 - 363 026	ČD Cargo
363 028 - 363 029	ČD Cargo
363 030	ČD
363 031 - 363 032	ČD Cargo
363 034 - 363 038	ČD Cargo
363 041	ČD Cargo
363 043 - 363 045	ČD Cargo
363 047 - 363 051	ČD Cargo
363 054	ČD
363 058 - 363 059	ČD Cargo
363 061	ČD
363 063	ČD Cargo
363 064	ČD
363 065 - 363 067	ČD Cargo
363 069	ČD
363 071	ČD
363 072 - 363 075	ČD Cargo
363 088 - 363 100	ZSSK Cargo
363 101	ZSSK
363 102 - 363 106	ZSSK Cargo
363 107	ZSSK
363 114	ČD
363 132	ČD
363 133 - 363 137	ZSSK
363 138 - 363 142	ZSSK Cargo
363 143 - 363 147	ZSSK

As of June 23, 2008, 12 363s remained in service with ZSSK, 23 with ZSSK Cargo, 63 with ČD and 47 with ČD Cargo.

== See also ==
- List of České dráhy locomotive classes
