= ČD Class 840 and 841 =

Czech diesel multiple unit

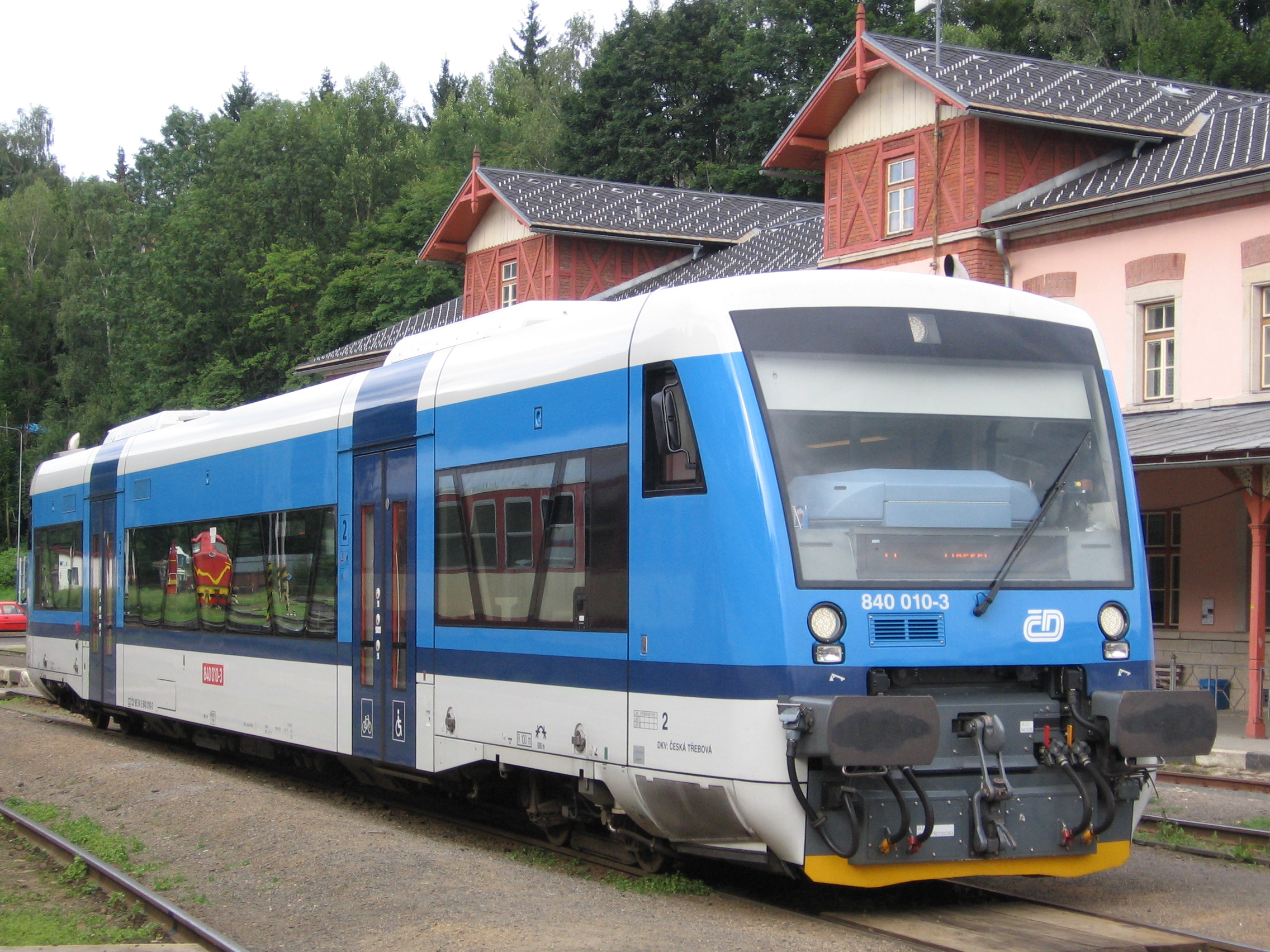
840.010 at Tanvald station

The ČD Class 840 and ČD Class 841 diesel multiple units are two versions of the Stadler Regio-Shuttle RS1 built for České dráhy. The Class 841 is the basic version while the Class 840 is a modification for services on steep mountain lines. Since 2013, České dráhy have been using the marketing name RegioSpider for these trainsets.

== Class 840 ==
ČD Class 840
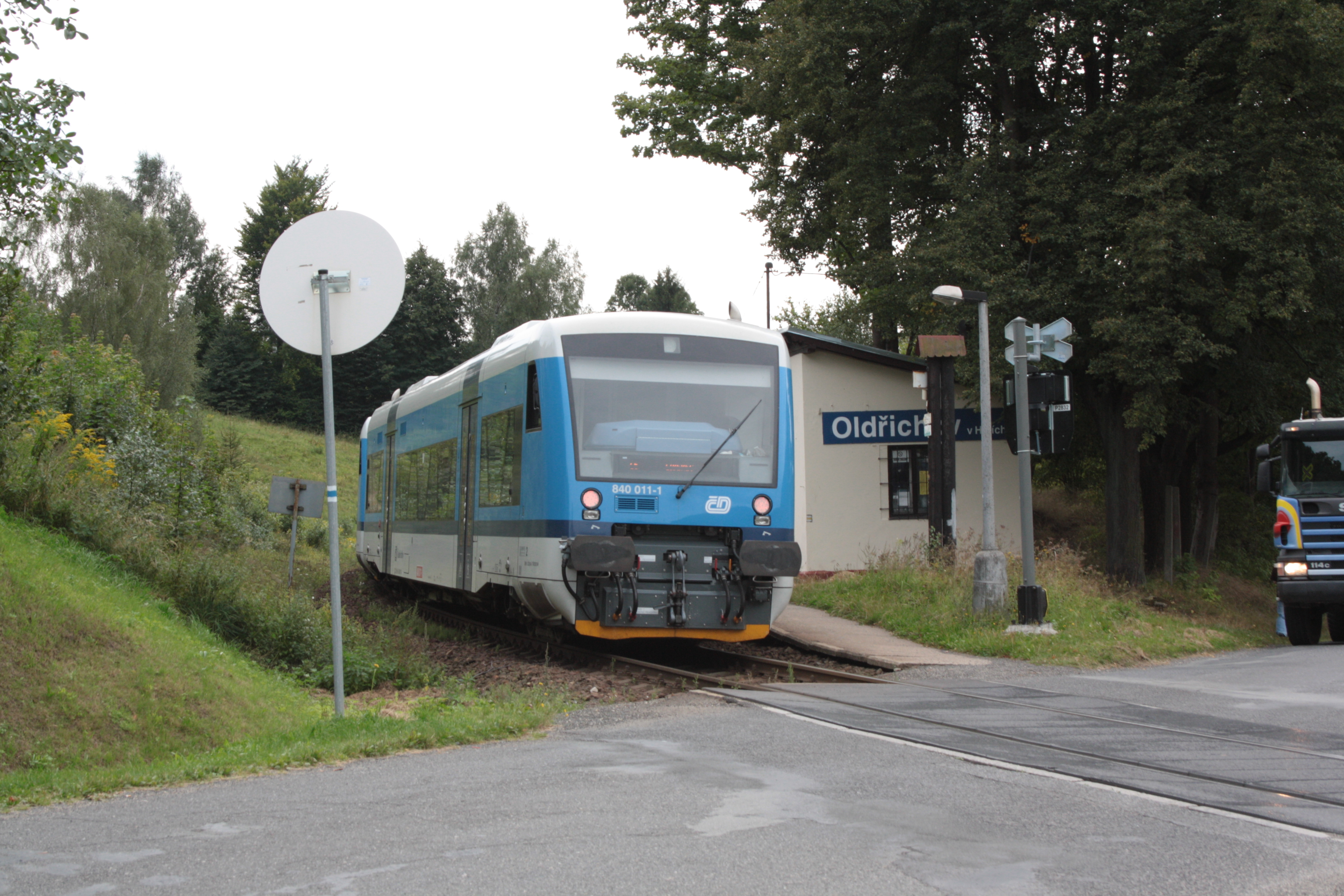
- Manufacturer: Stadler Rail
- Constructed: 2011 — 2012
- Number built: 16

Specifications
- Train length: 25,500 mm (83 ft 8 in)
- Maximum speed: 120 km/h (75 mph)
- Weight: 48.5 t (47.7 long tons; 53.5 short tons)
- Prime mover: Diesel engine
- Engine type: 2× Iveco Cursor 8
- Power output: 2× 265
- Tractive effort: 29 kN

ČD Class 840 is used on services in Liberec Region. There are 16 trains in service. The maximum speed is 120 km/h, while it was meant to be just 100 km/h at the time of order, the unit is modified for service on steep lines and lines that use rack rails. The rack rail compatibility was required to be able to serve the Tanvald to Harrachov line, but the trains themselves lack rack railway equipment.

== Class 841 ==
ČD Class 841
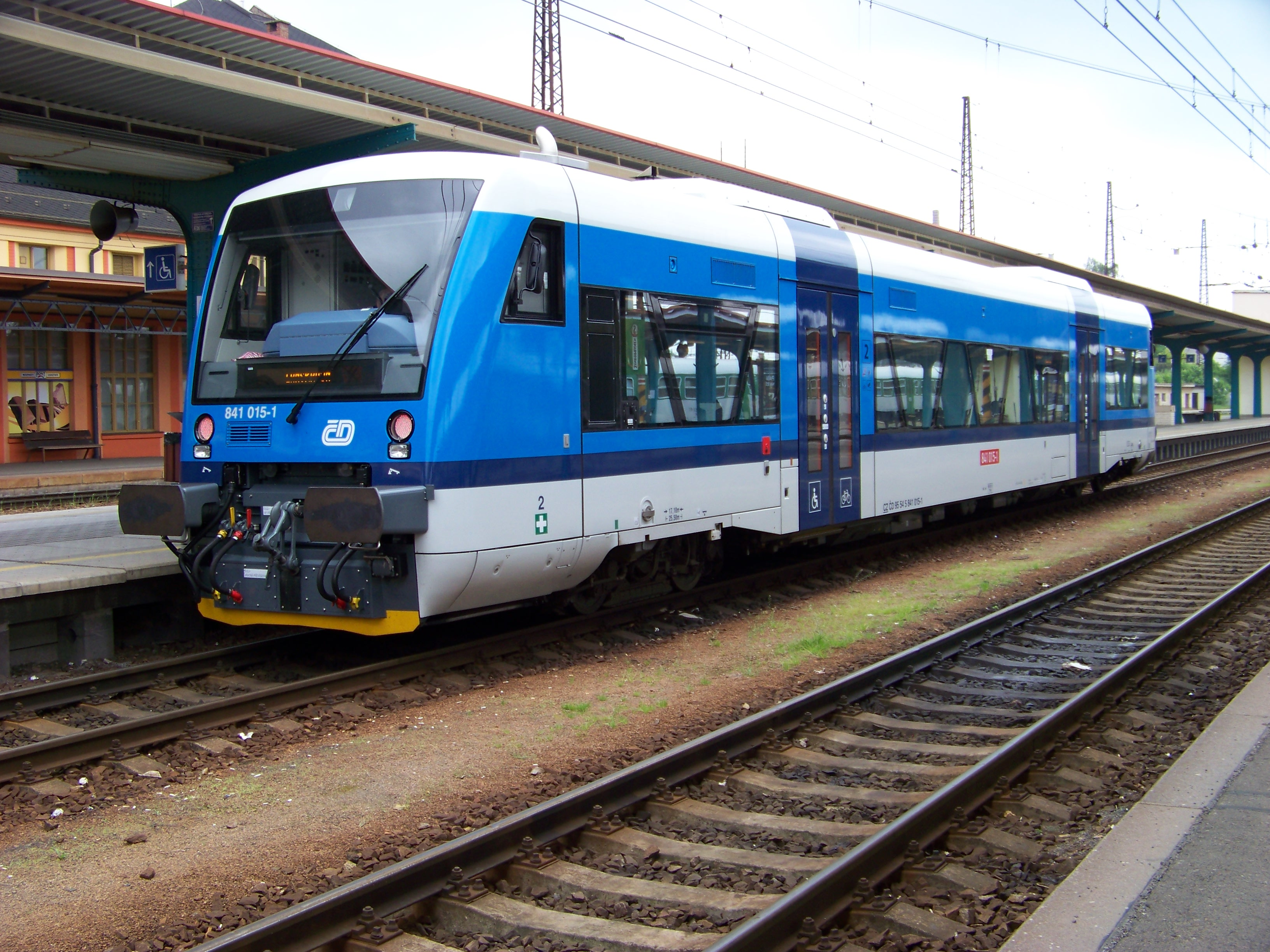
- Manufacturer: Stadler Rail
- Constructed: 2011 — 2013
- Number built: 17

Specifications
- Train length: 25,500 mm (83 ft 8 in)
- Maximum speed: 120 km/h (75 mph)
- Weight: 48.5 t (47.7 long tons; 53.5 short tons)
- Prime mover: Diesel engine
- Engine type: 2× Iveco Cursor 8
- Power output: 2× 265
- Tractive effort: 29 kN

ČD Class 841 is used in Vysočina Region. České dráhy have ordered 17 trains; the total amount paid for them was 898 million Kč, of which 200 million Kč was covered by the European Union, the investment of České dráhy themselves was 678.8 million Kč.

=== Class 841.2 ===
ČD has acquired 22 RegioShuttles second-hand from German operators. These have been classified as 841.2

== Gallery ==
A class 841 diesel multiple unit at the Rudoltice station

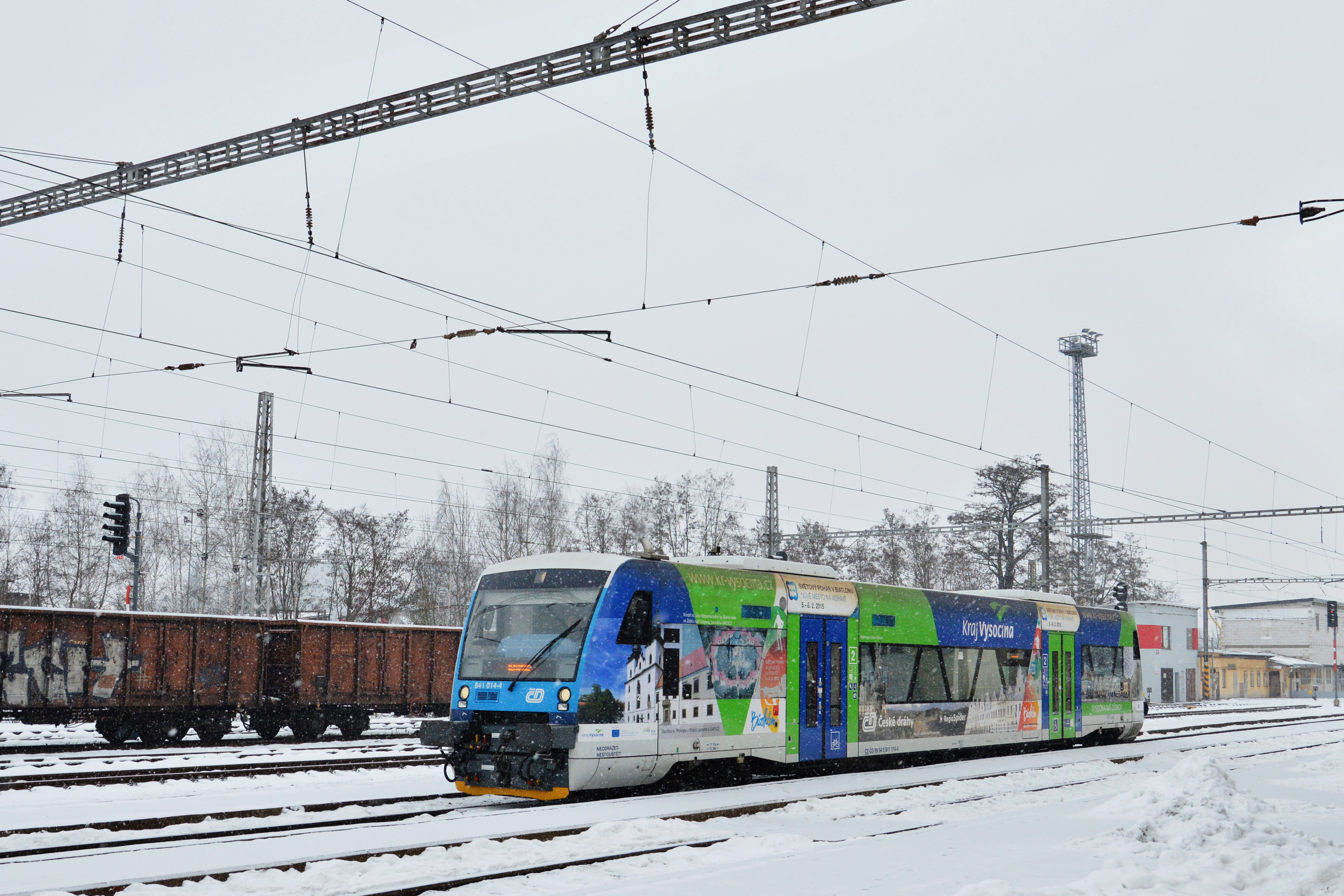
841.014 between Jihlava město and Slavonice
