= ČSD Class E 499.3 =

Class of Czechoslovak electric locomotives

ČSD E 499.3 ČD 163 / ZSSK 163
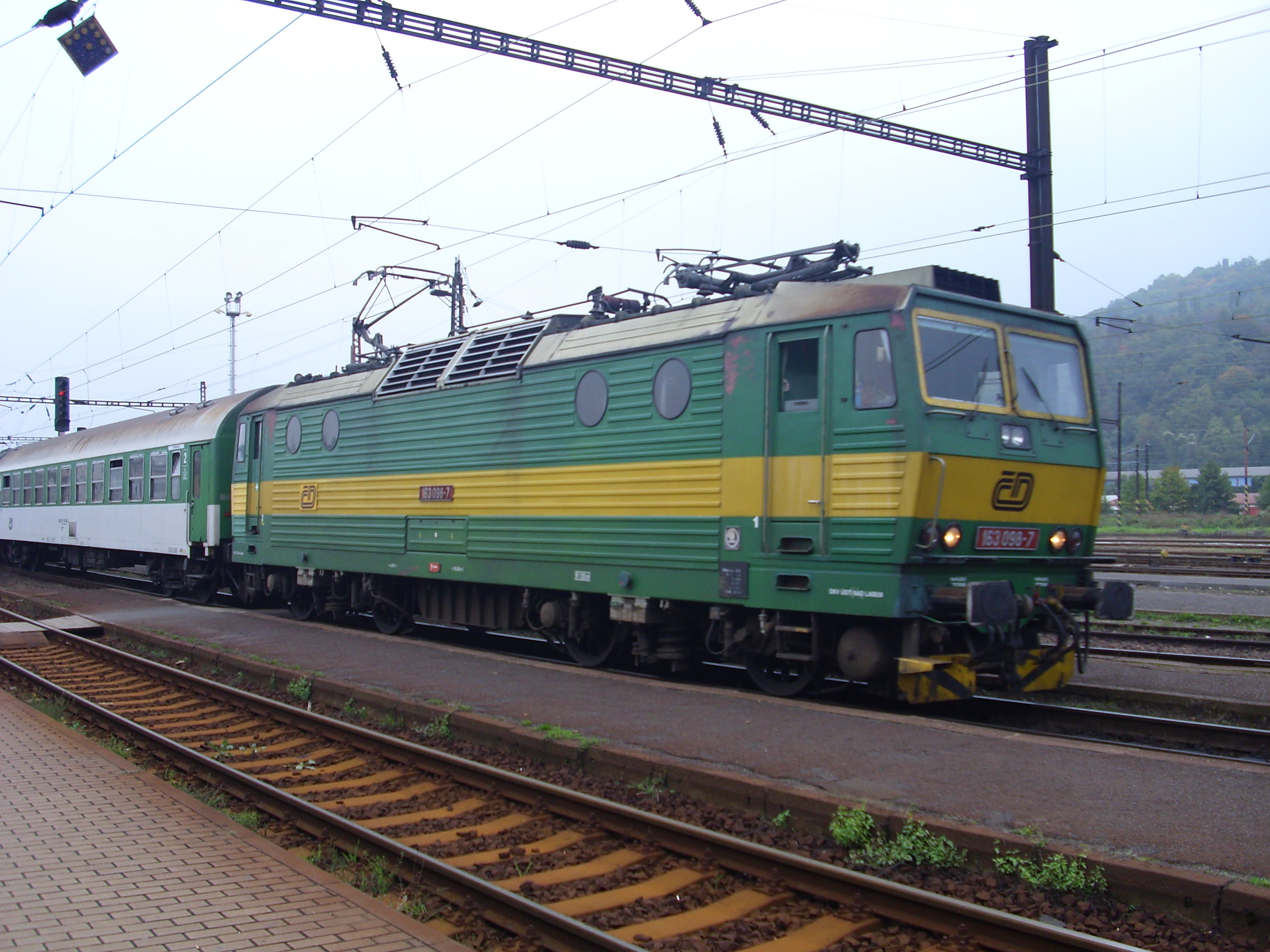
- ČD 163.098
Type and origin
- Power type: Electric
- Builder: Škoda Works
- Model: 71E
- Build date: 1984–1992
- Total produced: 120+36 rebuilt from Class 162
Specifications
- Configuration
  - UIC: Bo′Bo′
- Gauge: 1,435 mm (4 ft 8 1/2 in) standard gauge
- Length: 16,800 mm (55 ft 1 in)
- Width: 2,940 mm (9 ft 8 in)
- Height: 4,640 mm (15 ft 3 in)
- Loco weight: 84 tonnes (83 long tons; 93 short tons)
- Electric system/s: 3000 V DC overhead lines
- Current pickup: Pantograph
- Traction motors: AL 4562 FiR Thyristor control
Performance figures
- Maximum speed: 120 km/h (75 mph)
- Power output: 3,480 kW (4,670 hp)
- Tractive effort: 285 kN (64,100 lbf)
Career
- Nicknames: Peršing

ČSD Class E 499.3 electric locomotives were used primarily for passenger trains in Czechoslovakia. Locomotives which passed to České dráhy, rail operator in the Czech Republic are now classified as Class 163, those which passed to ZSSK, rail operator in Slovakia, are also Class 163.

E 499.3 locomotives operate on the 3,000 V DC system and are essentially a DC only version of the ES 499.1.

ČD Class 163.2 and some ZSSK Class 163 locomotives were rebuilt from ČD and ZSSK Class 162. This was caused by lack of fast dual system locomotives as only one Class 362 locomotive was built. This situation solved ČD by switching the bogies between locomotives of ČD Class 363 (same as ŽSR/ZSSK Class 363) and Class 162, ŽSR by switching only the speed-change box and axletrees between Class 363 and Class 162. After that procedure, the locomotives were classified ČD and ŽSR/ZSSK Class 362 and ČD Class 163.2 and ŽSR/ZSSK Class 163.

== History ==
The locomotive was produced in the years 1984-1992 in four series of 20, 40 (2nd and 3rd serie) and 60 engines.

Because it was a slightly modified version of ČSD Class ES 499.1, there weren't any prototypes built. The first series of locomotives were sent to Ústí nad Labem, next two series were sent to Olomouc, Košice and Česká Třebová. Currently, the ČD are units in Česká Třebová, Děčín and Bohumín and ZSSK units in Košice and Žilina.

== Modernisation ==
All 30 locomotives owned by ČD Cargo were rebuilt to class 363.5 (dual voltage) by Škoda. ZSSK announced tender for rebuilding 15 locomotives class 163/162 to class 361, which was won by ŽOS Vrútky. As of January, 2014, 5 locomotives of class 361 (dual voltage, max. speed 140 km/h) and 4 locomotives of class 361.1 (dual voltage, max. speed 160 km/h) were built.

Since 2013, they were used for operation in push-pull sets with driving trailers and they were used mostly operate services in various commuter trains.

Class E 499.3 at the station Česká Třebová with a driving trailer at the end

== Service in other countries ==
=== Italy ===
==== E.630 ====
Because of the financial problems of ČSD (and then ČD and ŽSR) after the Velvet revolution, Škoda rebuilt 9 pieces of the fourth series and sold them to FNM, Italy. These were classified as FNM Class E.630. In 2010, all E630 locomotives were sold to Czech private operator RegioJet and were rebuilt to class 162.

== Disposition ==
163.021 - 163.022	ČD
163.025 - 163.026	ČD
163.029 - 163.030	ČD
163.034 - 163.035	ČD
163.039 - 163.048	ČD
163.050	ZSSK
163.052	ZSSK
163.054 - 163.055	ZSSK
163.057	ZSSK
163.061 - 163.100	ČD
163.101	ZSSK
163.104 - 163.111	ZSSK
163.112 - 163.119	ZSSK (rebuilt from Class 162)
163.121 - 163.124	ZSSK (rebuilt from Class 162)
163.215 - 163.217	ČD (rebuilt from Class 162)
163.233 - 163.234	ČD (rebuilt from Class 162)
163.241 - 163.245	ČD (rebuilt from Class 162)
163.247 - 163.252	ČD (rebuilt from Class 162)
163.255 - 163.260	ČD (rebuilt from Class 162)

As of 2008-06-19, 38 163s remained in service with ZSSK, 30 with ČD Cargo and 78 with ČD, as at 2008-03-02.

== See also ==
- List of České dráhy locomotive classes
