= ČD Class 242 =

Czechoslovak electric locomotive

ČSD Class S 499.02 ČD Class 242
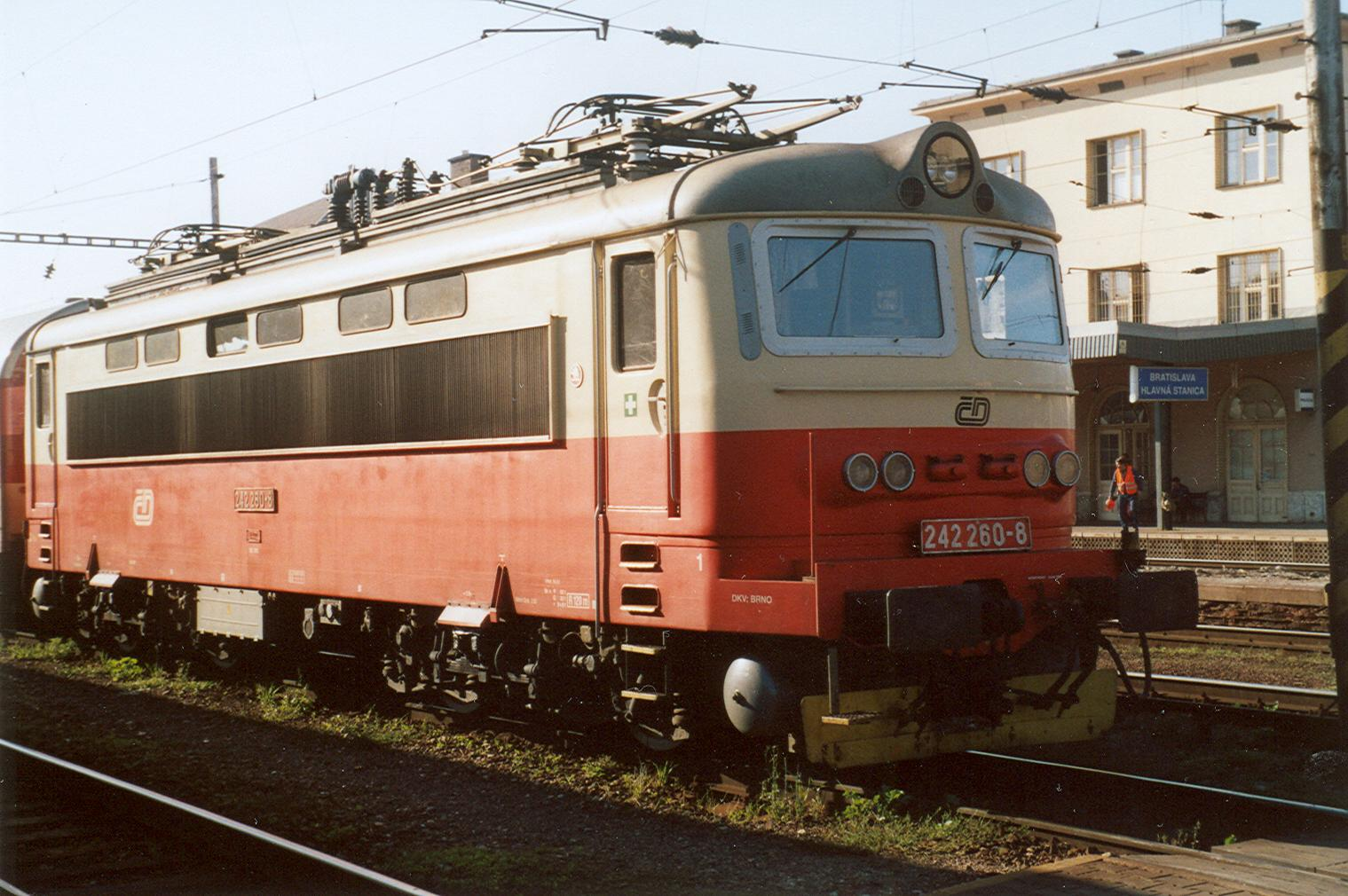
- 242.260 in Bratislava
Type and origin
- Power type: Electric
- Builder: Škoda Works
- Model: 73E
- Build date: 1975–1981
- Total produced: 90
Specifications
- Electric system/s: 25 kV 50 Hz AC
Career
- Operators: ČD, ZSSK
- Class: 242 CZE; 242 Slovakia
- Nicknames: Plecháč (Czech)
- Delivered: 1975 1979 1981
- First run: 1975

The ČD Class 242 or ZSSK Class 242 (formerly known as ČSD Class S 499.02) is a Czechoslovak electric locomotive made by Škoda Works. It is a single-system AC traction electric locomotive, which is operated by České dráhy. It was made between 1975 and 1981. In terms of development, it is a reconstruction of Class 240 locomotives. It goes up to 75mph (120km). It was made to operate on regional routes with a rake of 4–5 coaches like the Břeclav to Tišnov route. There are 65 of these trains in the Czech Republic and Slovakia.
