= ČD Class 700 =

ČSD Class T 211.0 ČD Class 700
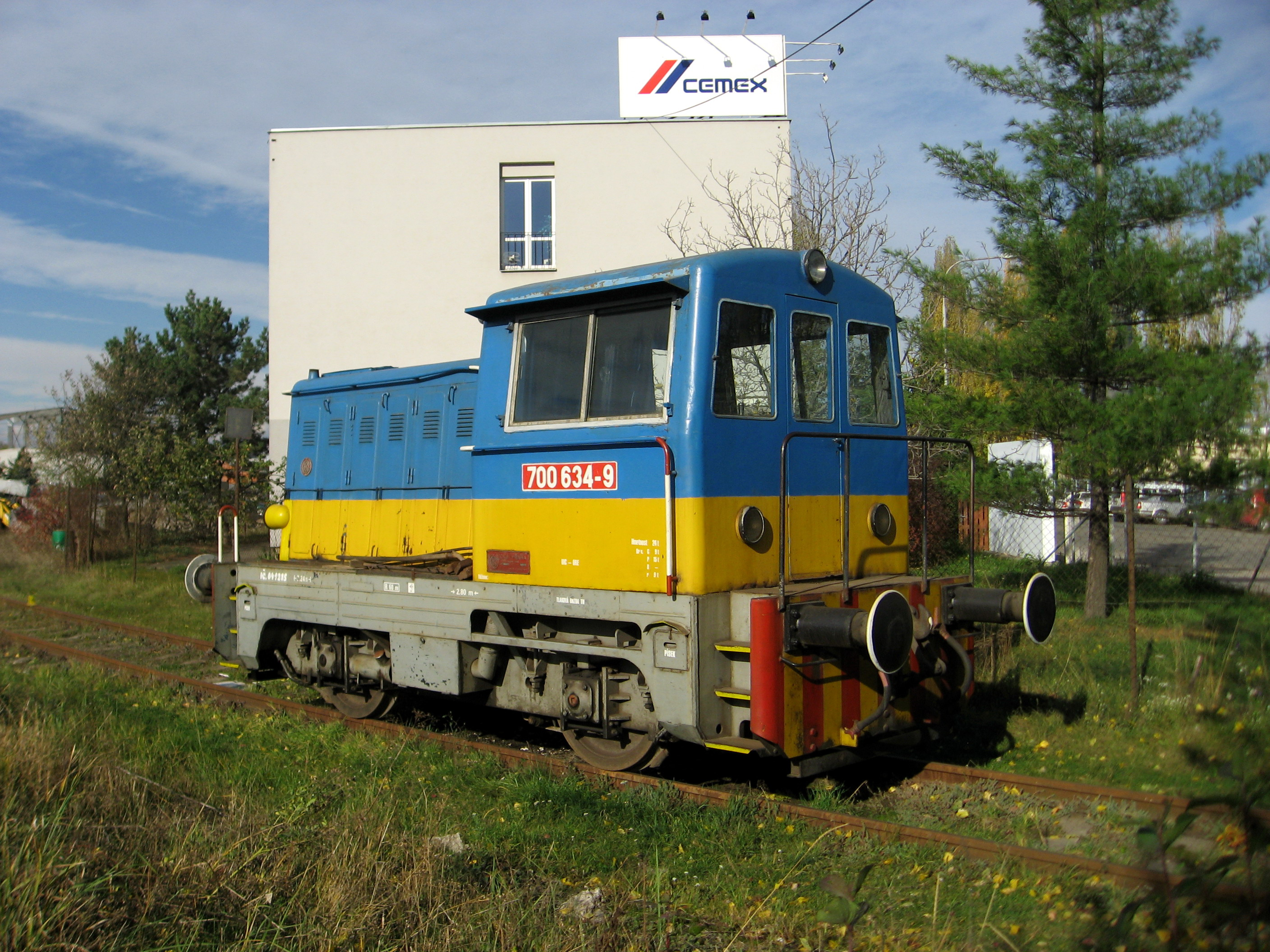
- ČD 700 634-9 at Porážka Street
Type and origin
- Power type: Diesel
- Designer: ČKD
- Builder: ČKD
- Build date: 1957-1962
- Total produced: 824
Specifications
- Configuration
  - UIC: B
- Gauge: 1425 mm
- Wheel diameter: 1000 mm
- Length
  - Over beams: 7240 mm
- Width: 2600 mm
- Height: 3348 mm
- Loco weight: 22 t
- Transmission: mechanical
Performance figures
- Maximum speed: 40 km/h
- Power output
  - Continuous: 121 kW

The ČD Class 700 (Formerly ČSD Class T 211.0) is a two-axle diesel–mechanical locomotive. It was designed for shunting in depots, stations and sidings.

In depots, these small locomotives were used for moving and hauling locomotives during repairs (when the locomotives could not move under their own power) and in places where it was necessary to move electric locomotives without overhead lines (in roundhouses, on turntables and in engine sheds where space were limited and therefore the small overall length over the bumpers often played an important role).

The locomotives were manufactured by ČKD between 1957 and 1962. A total of 824 were produced for the Czechoslovak State Railways, various Czechoslovak industrial enterprises and for export to the Soviet Union, the GDR, China, Romania, Albania and Bulgaria.

== Technical details ==
=== Engine ===
They were fitted with a Tatra 111 A engine. The engine is an air cooled, V12, fuel injected, four-stroke diesel. It has an output of 121 kW and a displacement of 14.823 litres. The cylinder bore is 110 mm and the piston stroke is 130 mm. Each cylinder has one intake and one exhaust valve, an injection nozzle and a piston equipped with five piston rings. The engine has three camshafts. One drives the intake valves and the other two drives the exhaust valves. The idle speed is set to 720 rpm, the nominal (maximum) speed to 1600 rpm.

=== Transmission ===
The locomotives were fitted with a ČKD M 150-4 mechanical, four-speed transmission which is used to transfer power from the engine to the two driven wheelsets.

== Historical locomotives ==
- 700.851 (Silesian Railway Association)
