= ČD Cargo =

State-owned Czech railway operator

ČD Cargo, a.s.
- Headquarters: Prague, Czech Republic
- Services: Freight transport
- Revenue: ▼CZK 16.1 bn. (2025)
- Net income: ▼CZK -3.1 bn. (2025)
- Total assets: ▼CZK 32.6 bn. Kč (2025)
- Total equity: ▼CZK 6.6 bn. (2025)
- Number of employees: ▼5,861 (2025)
- Parent: České dráhy, a.s. (100 %)
- Website: cdcargo.cz

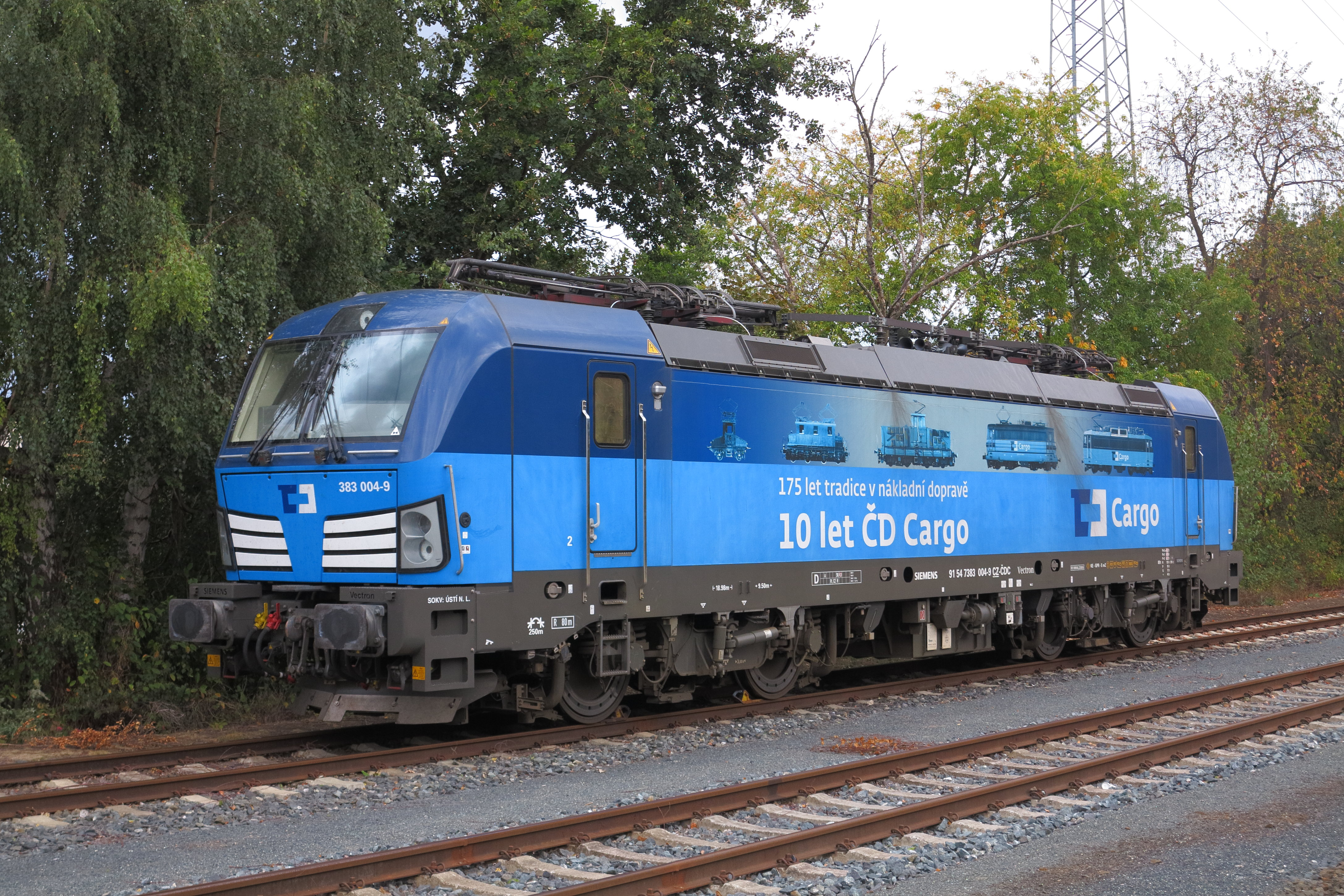
Siemens Vectron electric locomotive of ČD Cargo

ČD Cargo, a.s. (VKM: ČDC) is a state-owned Czech railway operator focused on freight operations. It is a wholly owned subsidiary of the passenger railway operator České dráhy.

== History ==
During the 1990s and 2000s, there were substantial efforts to restructure and modernise the railways of the Czech Republic; these included the founding of the railway operator České dráhy (Czech Railways) in January 2003. Seeking to reduce losses and become commercially competitive, various reforms were implemented, which included the centralisation of some activities (such as purchasing and internal stocking) while other activities were outsourced to third parties to increase efficiency; accordingly, employee headcount was reduced while new technologies were introduced. For the second phase of this restructuring, on 1 December 2007, České dráhy spun off its freight operations into the newly established subsidiary ČD Cargo. At the time of its creation, the value of transferred long term assets with original accounting value amounting to CZK 4.8 billion was increased by evaluation difference CZK 5.5 billion, as calculated by the advisory company YBN CONSULT. As a result, ownership equity amounted to CZK 9.1 billion and CZK 8.8 billion of registered capital was entered into the commercial register.

At the time of its founding, ČD Cargo benefitted from the Czech Republic possessing amongst the highest density of railway tracks in Europe, roughly one third of which was electrified; however, the network had been underinvested in during the latter part of the twentieth century while road transportation had expanded greatly to carry around 75% of freight by 2008 against 22% going by rail. In May 2008, Josef Bazala, director general of ČD Cargo, noted that the operator owned 950 locomotives and approximately 26 thousand freight cars, whilst roughly 12,500 employees had been transferred from České dráhy to ČD Cargo. Furthermore, Bazala stated that the organisation was currently pursuing several medium term goals, including the renewal of its rolling stock, the construction of new logistics centres, and the general improvement of customer service levels; over the following two years, €120 million was invested into new purchases, reconstruction, and modernisation.

Early on, ČD Cargo openly pursued various business opportunities outside of its domestic market; it quickly become engaged in multiple projects European Union (EU) projects. By 2016, the organisation had developed its international footprint to become one of the five biggest rail freight carriers active in the EU. As such, in addition to serving customers at approximately 1,000 locations across the Czech Republic, ČD Cargo was, via its subsidiary companies, hauling mixed materials (mainly coal) in Poland, transporting intermodal freight in Slovakia and Hungary, and conveying automotive goods in Germany. Shortly following the 2022 Russian invasion of Ukraine, ČD Cargo started hauling aid from the Czech Republic to Ukraine. In April 2022, the subsidiary ČD Cargo Adria secured a license to operate freight services in Croatia.

During 2018, plans were mooted for the privatisation of ČD Cargo. However, in November of that year, it was announced that no change would occur and that ČD Cargo would remain a state-owned entity; this was reportedly due to a decision by Andrej Babiš, the Prime Minister of the Czech Republic, to veto the proposal.

ČD Cargo has operated a diverse fleet of locomotives; amongst its oldest are the Class 742 diesel locomotives, originally built between 1977 and 1986; by the 2020s, ČD Cargo was struggling to maintain them due to a lack of spare components. Thus, the company has issued CZ Loko with multiple contracts to modernise numerous Class 742s into Effishunter 1000M units, which are reclassified as Class 742.71; by May 2022, ČD Cargo had 37 modernised Class 742.71 locomotives in its inventory. The company has also pursued new-build locomotives; in October 2020, ČD Cargo issued a tender for the supply of up to 26 new electric locomotives for the operation of its international freight services. During July 2020, ČD Cargo commenced operation of its fleet of 10 Alstom Traxx dual-power locomotives, which are equipped with a last-mile diesel engine in addition to its electric mode; up to 40 may be ordered in an existing framework with the manufacturer.

Both ČD Cargo and parent company České dráhy have operated Siemens Vectron electric locomotives; these are often leased from other companies. ČD Cargo received its first Vectron in 2016; the type is suitable for operation in the Czech Republic, Slovakia, Hungary, Poland, Austria, Germany, the Netherlands, and Belgium, being equipped to operate ETCS Level 2 Baseline 3 and under four types of electrification: 1.5 kV dc, 3 kV DC, 25 kV 50 Hz AC and 15 kV 16.7 Hz AC. During August 2022, ČD Cargo ordered an additional ten Vectron MS locomotives under a framework contract for up to 50; it already operated 12 such locomotives by this point.

In 2020, on account of the economic consequences of the COVID-19 pandemic, ČD Cargo experienced its most challenging operating circumstances; there was a major reduction, by approximately four million tonnes, in goods being transported over the previous year, which led to the company recording an after-tax loss of -248 million CZK for the year. However, by April 2021, freight operations had reportedly returned to profitability; austerity measures, such as 500 employees being made redundant and the discarding of 1,200 wagons and several dozen locomotives, had helped stem losses. In November 2022, it was announced that Czech plans to subsidise electrified rail operations had been approved by the European Commission, benefitting companies such as ČD Cargo.

== See also ==
- České dráhy
- List of ČD Classes
- Rail transport in the Czech Republic
