= České dráhy =

Czech passenger rail transport operator

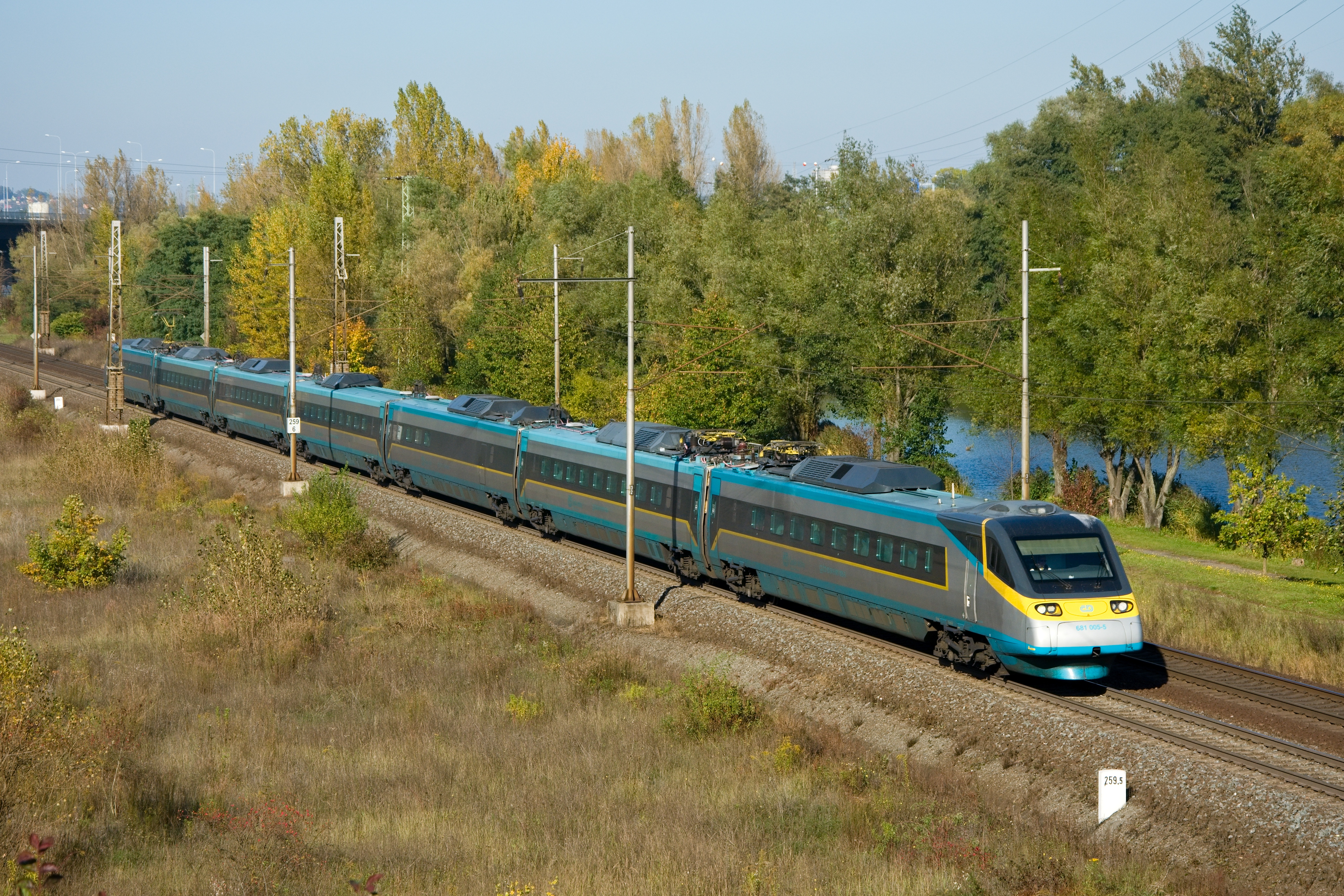
- Modern ČD unit class 680 Pendolino
- Type: Government-owned
- Industry: Railway company
- Predecessors: České dráhy s.o. (1993–2002); ČSD (1918–1992)
- Founded: Prague (2003)
- Headquarters: Prague, Czech Republic
- Key people: Lenka Hamplová
- Revenue: ▲40.656 billion CZK (2019)
- Operating income: 1,262,000,000 Czech koruna (2024)
- Net income: ▲1.315 billion CZK (2019)
- Total assets: ▲95.991 billion CZK (2019)
- Total equity: ▲41.939 billion CZK (2019)
- Owner: Ministry of transport (100%)
- Number of employees: ▼23.529 (2019)
- Subsidiaries: ČD Cargo
- Website: www.cd.cz www.ceskedrahy.cz

České dráhy (ČD; literally "Czech Railways") is the main railway operator providing passenger services in the Czech Republic. It is wholly owned by the Czech state and operates regional, long-distance and international services.

The company was established in 1993 following the dissolution of Czechoslovakia, succeeding the Czechoslovak State Railways in the Czech Republic. In 2003, responsibility for the railway infrastructure was transferred to the newly established Správa železnic.

Since the 2010s, České dráhy has undertaken a large-scale renewal of its regional and long-distance rolling stock, including the introduction of ComfortJet trains, RegioPanter and RegioFox regional units, and new Siemens Vectron locomotives.

== History ==
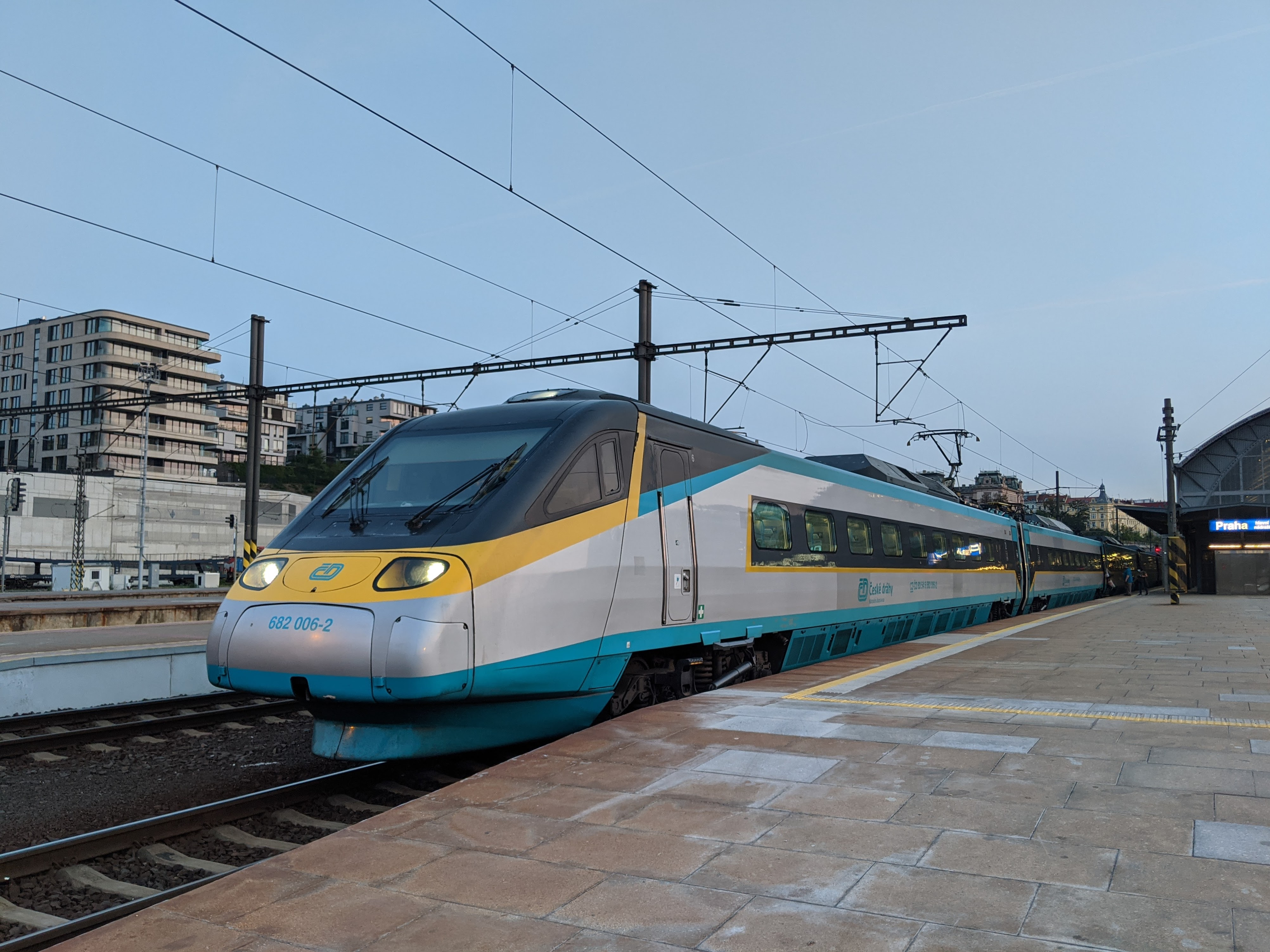
ČD Class 680 Pendolino long-distance train

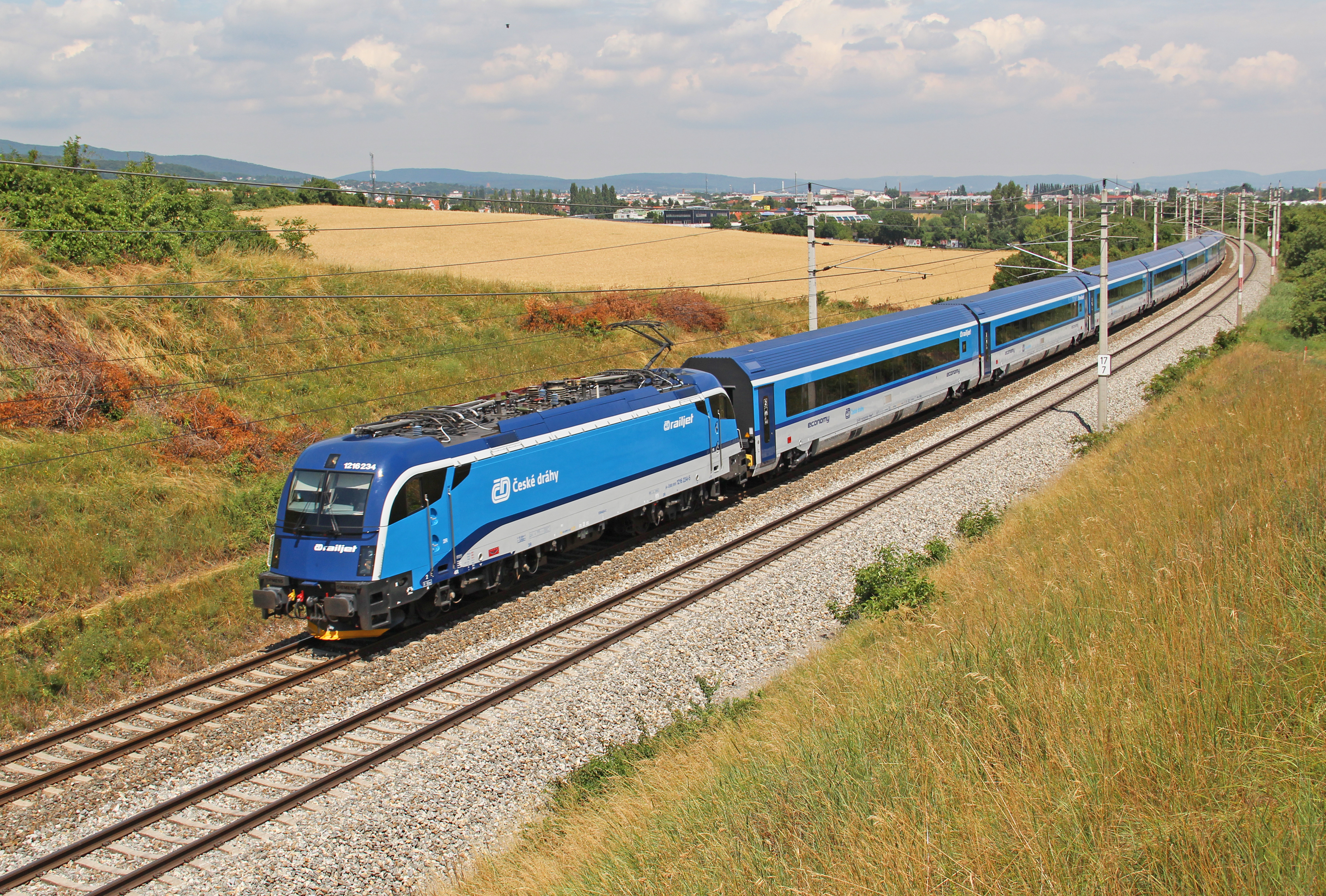
ČD railjet long-distance train

In 1827–1836, the České Budějovice–Linz railway was built, which was the second horse-drawn railway in continental Europe was established. The first steam-hauled railway in the area was established in 1839, from Vienna to Břeclav. The first standard gauge electrified railway track in the area was built in 1903.

Czechoslovak State Railways (Czech: Československé státní dráhy, abbreviated as ČSD), the predecessor of České dráhy, was established in 1918. In 1991, the first EuroCity (EC) trains ran on ČSD railways.

České dráhy was founded in 1993, following the breakup of Czechoslovakia. The company began a program of renovating Pan-European railway corridors the same year. The following year, the company launched truck transportation ("RoLa") on ČD railways from Lovosice to Dresden, which it stopped in 2004.

During the 1990s, there was a noticeable drop in railway traffic throughout the Czech Republic, a phenomenon that coincided with a massive expansion in road transport. Seeking to halt, or even partially reverse, this trend, substantial efforts were made to restructure and modernise the railways and their operation. One such measure was the establishment of České dráhy as a joint stock company in January 2003; soon thereafter, various subsidiaries were created that focused on various sectors, such as research, telecommunications, and rolling stock maintenance. Officials were keen to reduce the organisation's losses and to make it a commercially competitive venture, thus numerous reforms were implemented around this time, which included the centralisation of some activities (such as purchasing and internal stocking) while other activities were outsourced to third parties to increase efficiency. There was a general trend towards reducing employee headcount while various new technologies were brought in.

In 2005, Pendolino tilting trains entered the operator's regular service.

In subsequent years, the company's liabilities grew exponentially. Liabilities increased from 19 billion Czech koruna (CZK) at the end of 2006 to CZK 53 billion at the end of 2015.

For the second phase of this restructuring, on 1 December 2007, České dráhy spun off its freight operations into the newly established ČD Cargo, which remained a wholly owned subsidiary of České dráhy. Prior to 1 July 2008, České dráhy was the biggest employer in the Czech Republic. Prior to the late 2000s, the organisation had historically incurred losses as a matter of routine, thus necessitating the provision of subsidies from the Czech government. However, during 2007, České dráhy recorded a profit of 53 million CZK (2.1 million Euros), which was the first time the company had recorded a profit in its history. Despite this milestone, České dráhy has continued to receive government subsidies and undergo periodic reforms with the aim of cutting costs to become a routinely profitable operating concern.

In 2008, ČD Sky, an alliance between České dráhy and the airline SkyEurope, was created. SkyEurope, which was heavily indebted, ceased operations in August 2009.

Measures aimed at increasing operating efficiency have spanned various aspects of the organisation. During January 2008, plans to transfer passenger transport operations to an independent subsidiary were met with approval from the Czech government. While České dráhy is responsible for operating train services, the management and operation of the railway infrastructure (such as the tracks, signals, and stations) is managed by Správa železniční dopravní cesty (SŽDC). During December 2010, the Czech government proposed bringing SŽDC and ČD together in a single holding company. Around this time, the government also changed the subsidy available to both ČD and SŽDC. During 2018, plans were mooted for the privatisation of subsidiary ČD Cargo. However, in November of that year, it was announced that no change would occur and that ČD Cargo would remain a state-owned entity; this was reportedly due to a decision by Andrej Babiš, the Prime Minister of the Czech Republic, to veto the proposal.

During the 2010s, the open-access operator RegioJet has competed directly with České dráhy for passenger patronage between Prague and Ostrava. On 29 September 2011, the latter adopted similar pricing to those charged by RegioJet on the same route, which RegioJet declared to be unfair competition and a misuse of České dráhy's dominant position. Two years later, RegioJet took legal action over České dráhy's pricing policy, alleging its negative impact on its business results. During June 2022, the European Commission claimed that, between 2012 and 2016, České dráhy and the Austrian train operator ÖBB had colluded to prevent RegioJet from obtaining long-distance coaches from the latter. Incriminating emails from February 2015 requested OBB not accept Regiojet's offer despite it being 33% more than the next best.

In 2014, the first "ČD Railjet" with passengers ran in the Czech Republic.

Modern rolling stock from international manufacturers has been purchases on multiple occasions. Perhaps the most prominent is the ČD Class 680 Pendolino, a high speed tilting train, which was originally intended for operating international services between Berlin, Prague, and Vienna. A successor to the Pendolino was reportedly being sought during the early 2020s; the company has also declared its ambitions to build a dedicated high speed network akin to the TGV. During the 2010s, both České dráhy and freight subsidiary ČD Cargo were operating Siemens Vectron electric locomotives; these have often been leased from other companies. In December 2021, a CZK 5 billion (225.4 million United States dollars) contract for a further 31 three-car RegioPanter electric multiple units (EMUs) was issued to Škoda Transportation, making for a total fleet size of 110 such trains operated by České dráhy. The company has also explored the use of alternative fuel vehicles.

In 2019, the supervisory board of České dráhy dismissed its Chairman Miroslav Kupec, who had been in office since September 2018, as Kupec faced an investigation over possible illegal conduct.

In November 2022, it was announced that Czech plans to subsidise electrified rail operations had been approved by the European Commission, benefitting companies such as České dráhy. That same month, plans were revealed to modernise in excess of 2,000 coaches and other rail vehicles over the next four years at an annual cost of roughly Koruna 3.5bn (142.2 million United States dollars).

== Statistics ==
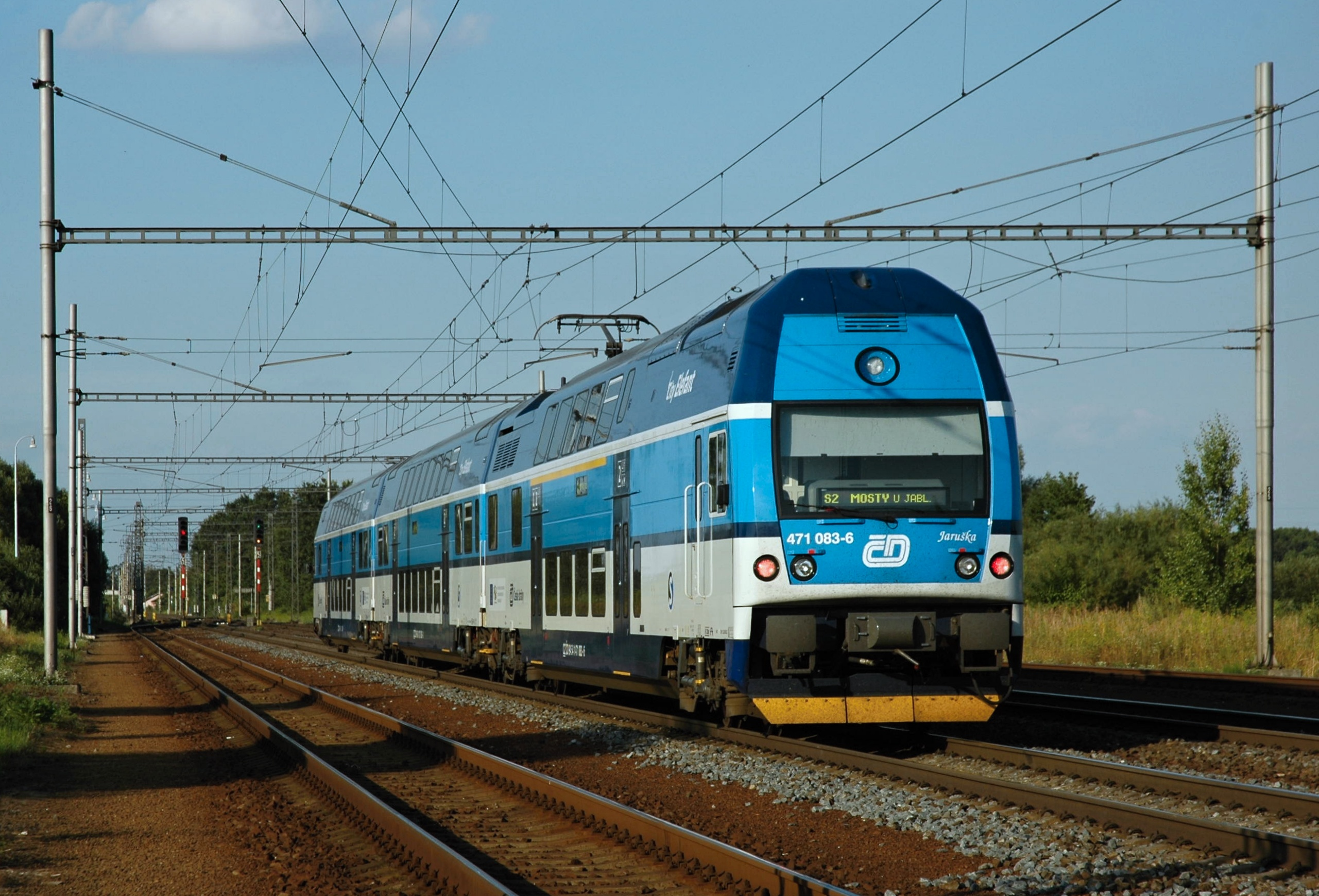
ČD Class 471 suburban train

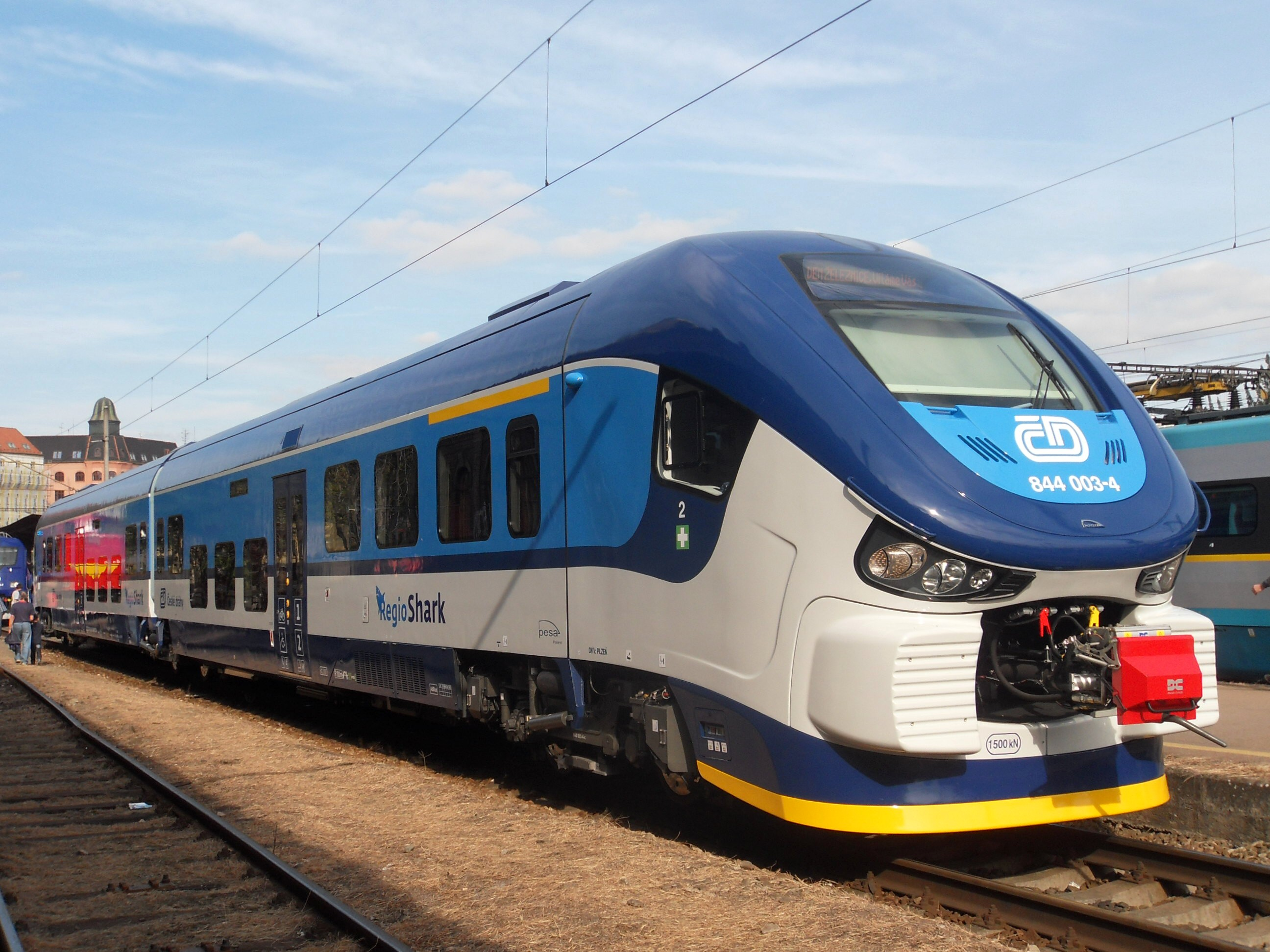
ČD Class 844 regional train

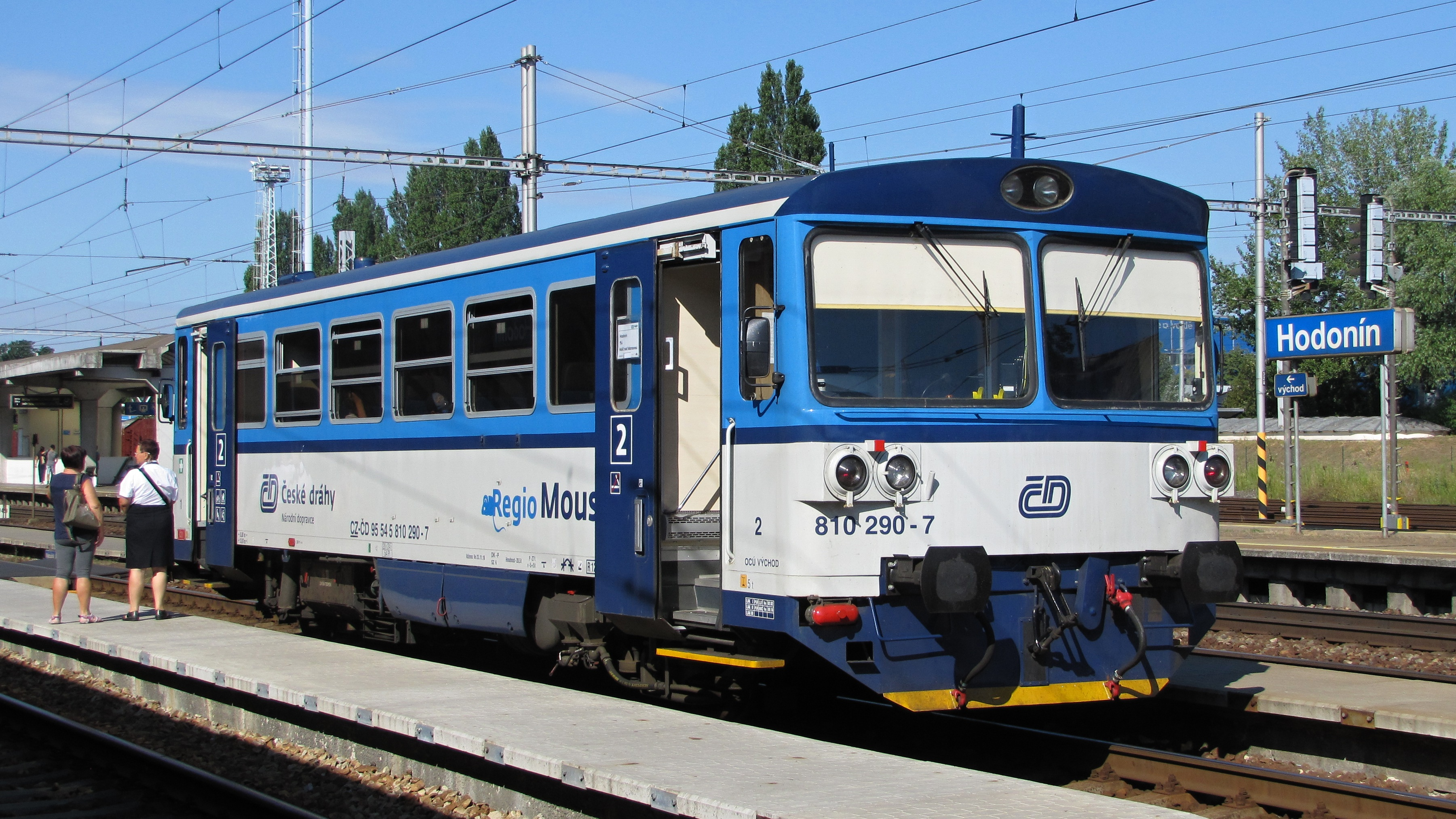
ČD Class 810 regional train

Selected operating statistics for 2025:

Measure	Value
Passengers carried	168 million
Passenger-kilometres	8.0 billion
Passenger trains operated	2,427,132
Freight carried by ČD Cargo	57.8 million tonnes

== Freight services ==
ČD Cargo, the cargo subsidiary, mainly transports raw materials, intermediate goods and containers. As of 2009, it is ranked in the top five largest railway cargo operators in Europe.

== Rolling stock ==
=== Regional services ===
ČD's regional electric fleet includes double-deck CityElefant trains used around Prague and RegioPanter units. RegioPanters have replaced older electric units and locomotive-hauled trains on regional routes. The company also operates RegioPanter trains branded Moravia, owned by the South Moravian Region.

For unelectrified lines, ČD ordered RegioFox diesel units from Pesa with low-floor access, air conditioning, accessible toilets and electronic passenger information. Some routes use refurbished Regio-Shuttle RS1 railcars bought second-hand from German operators.

=== Long-distance services ===
ČD's long-distance trains include Pendolino electric multiple units and locomotive-hauled Railjet, InterJet and ComfortJet sets. The nine-car ComfortJets, built by Siemens Mobility and Škoda Group, serve international routes to Germany, Austria and Denmark and are designed for speeds of up to 230 km/h. ČD also ordered Siemens Vectron multisystem electric locomotives with the same maximum speed to haul express trains.

== Tourism ==
In 1999, the České dráhy Museum was opened in Lužná. It is the largest railway museum in the Czech Republic with the largest collection of steam locomotives.

== See also ==
- Rail transport in the Czech Republic
- Transport in the Czech Republic
- List of ČD Classes
- Valšov–Rýmařov railway
