= ČSD Class T 478.4 =

Class of diesel-electric locomotives

ČSD class T 478.4 ČD & ŽSR class 754
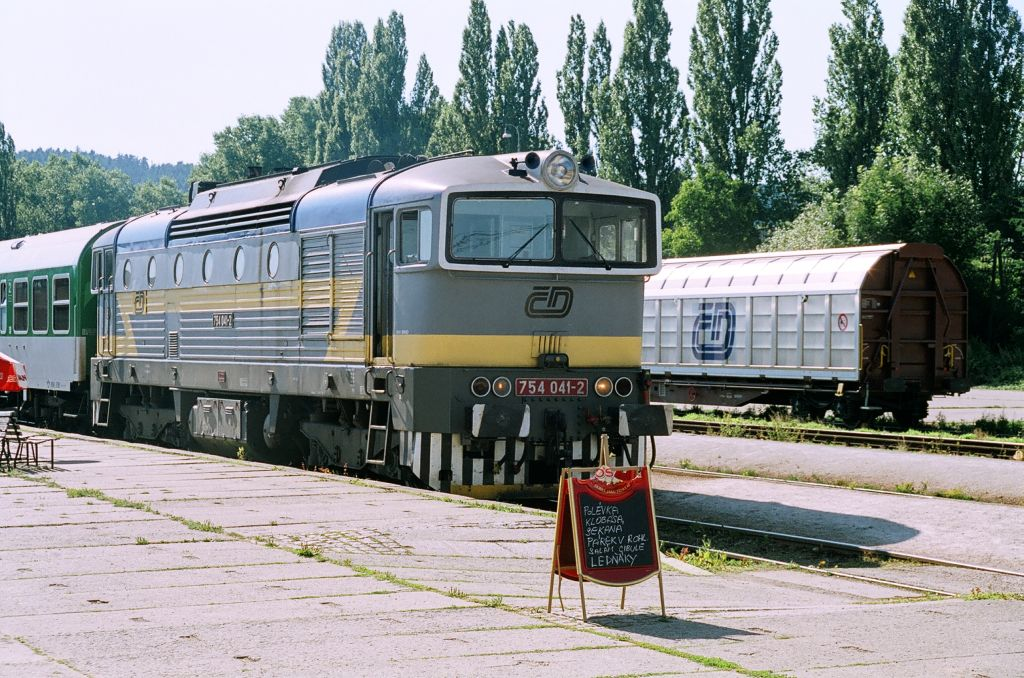
- 754 041-2 with a passenger train at Okříšky railway station, July 2006
Type and origin
- Power type: Diesel–electric
- Build date: Prototype: 1975; Production: 1978–1980 series
- Total produced: 86
Specifications
- Configuration
  - UIC: Bo′Bo′
- Gauge: 1,435 mm (4 ft 8 1/2 in)
- Length: 16,540 mm (54 ft 3 in)
- Width: 3,074 mm (10 ft 1 in)
- Height: 4,335 mm (14 ft 3 in)
- Loco weight: 74 tonnes (73 long tons; 82 short tons)
- Prime mover: ČKD K 12 V 230 DR
- Cylinders: 12
- Transmission: Electric
Performance figures
- Maximum speed: 100 km/h (62 mph)
- Power output: 1,472 kW (1,974 bhp)
- Tractive effort: 180 kN (40,000 lbf)
Career
- Operators: ČSD » ČD & ŽSR
- Numbers: ČSD: T 478.4001 – 4086)
- Nicknames: “Goggles”

T478.4 is a class of diesel locomotives designed, manufactured and used in the former Czechoslovakia and now used in the Czech republic (ČD Class 754) and Slovak republic (ZSSK Class 754). The locomotive is based on the T478.3 locomotive series. The most important difference was an electric train heating generator instead of the steam heating generator used on T478.3. To provide additional power needed for the heating generator, the prime mover power output was increased to 1470 kW, but the maximal power at the output of the traction generator remained the same as on Class T478.3. Another important new technology used on these locomotives was an electronic control system with an electrically controlled air brake valve and an automatic speed regulator, which was able to control not only the power output, but also the air brake. Their distinctive cab design has led to the nickname "Brejlovec" ("Goggles").

== History ==
In 1974, after the evaluation of the newly built T499.0 prototypes and considering their high weight and complexity, the Federal Ministry of Transport of Czechoslovakia sent a request to the ČKD design bureau to make a project of a locomotive similar to Class T478.3, but equipped with electric train heating generator. The first two prototypes were finished in December 1975. After trials, series production of 84 locomotives started in 1978. More locomotives were ordered, but the manufacture was terminated by a deliberately-set massive fire that destroyed the ČKD diesel engine plant at Smíchov district in Prague in 1980. The Ministry cancelled the contract for another 96 locomotives before the plant was rebuilt.

== Operation ==
The locomotives were used for heavy passenger and freight service, often double-headed. Since the main line electrification quickly progressed in the years following their manufacture, their importance somewhat decreased in the 1990s. During the rail market reorganisation in the 2000s, they were passed to the national passenger operators - Czech Railways in the Czech Republic and Železničná spoločnosť Slovensko in Slovakia. The two prototypes were withdrawn in 2011 and completely rebuilt to ČD Class 750.7. The series production locomotives remain in passenger operation until today (2020), some of them were withdrawn after accidents or fires. Since 2014, a few of the Czech locomotives have been modified for operation in Poland and leased to Polish rail operator PKP Intercity.

== Gallery ==
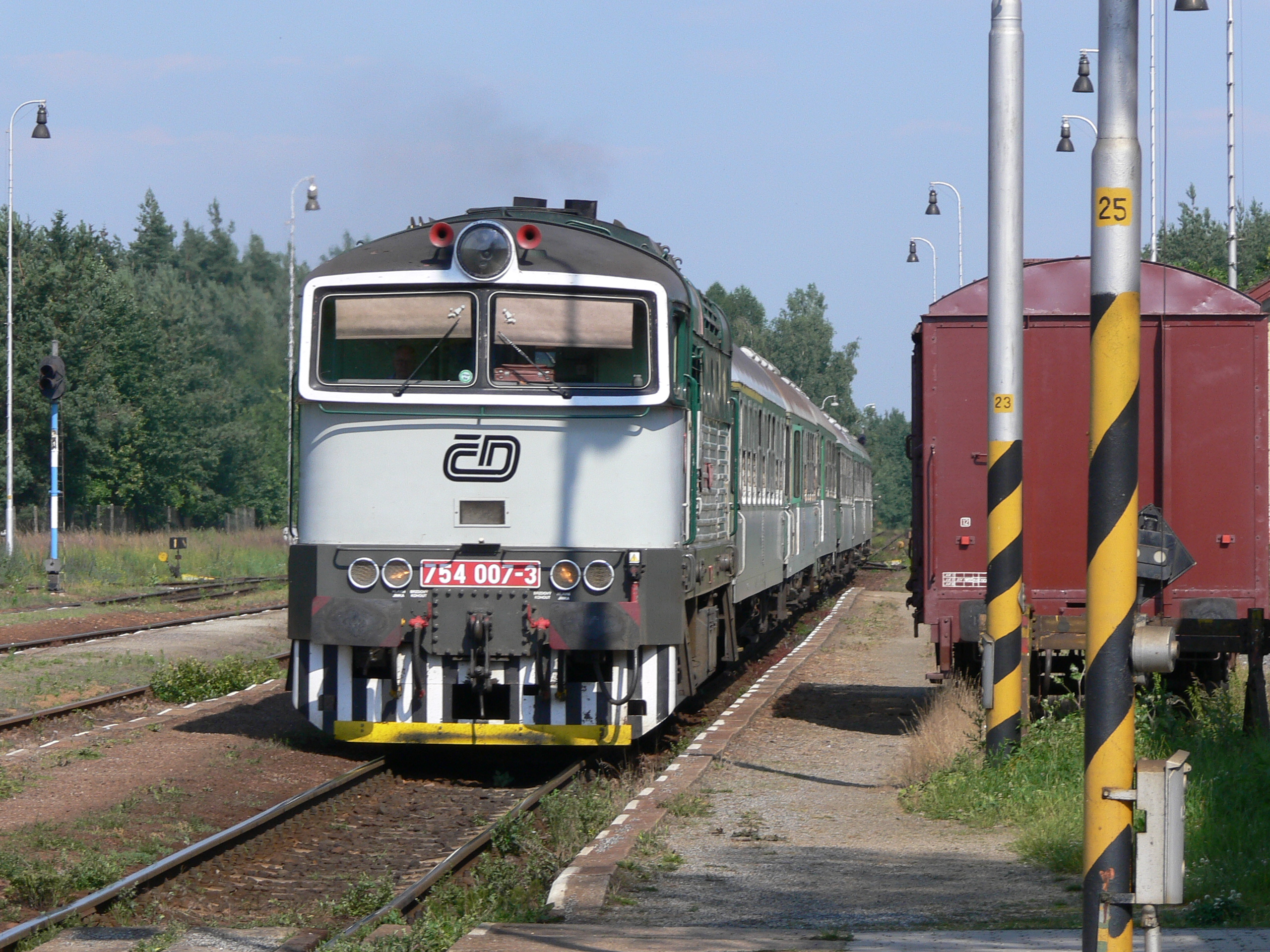
754 007

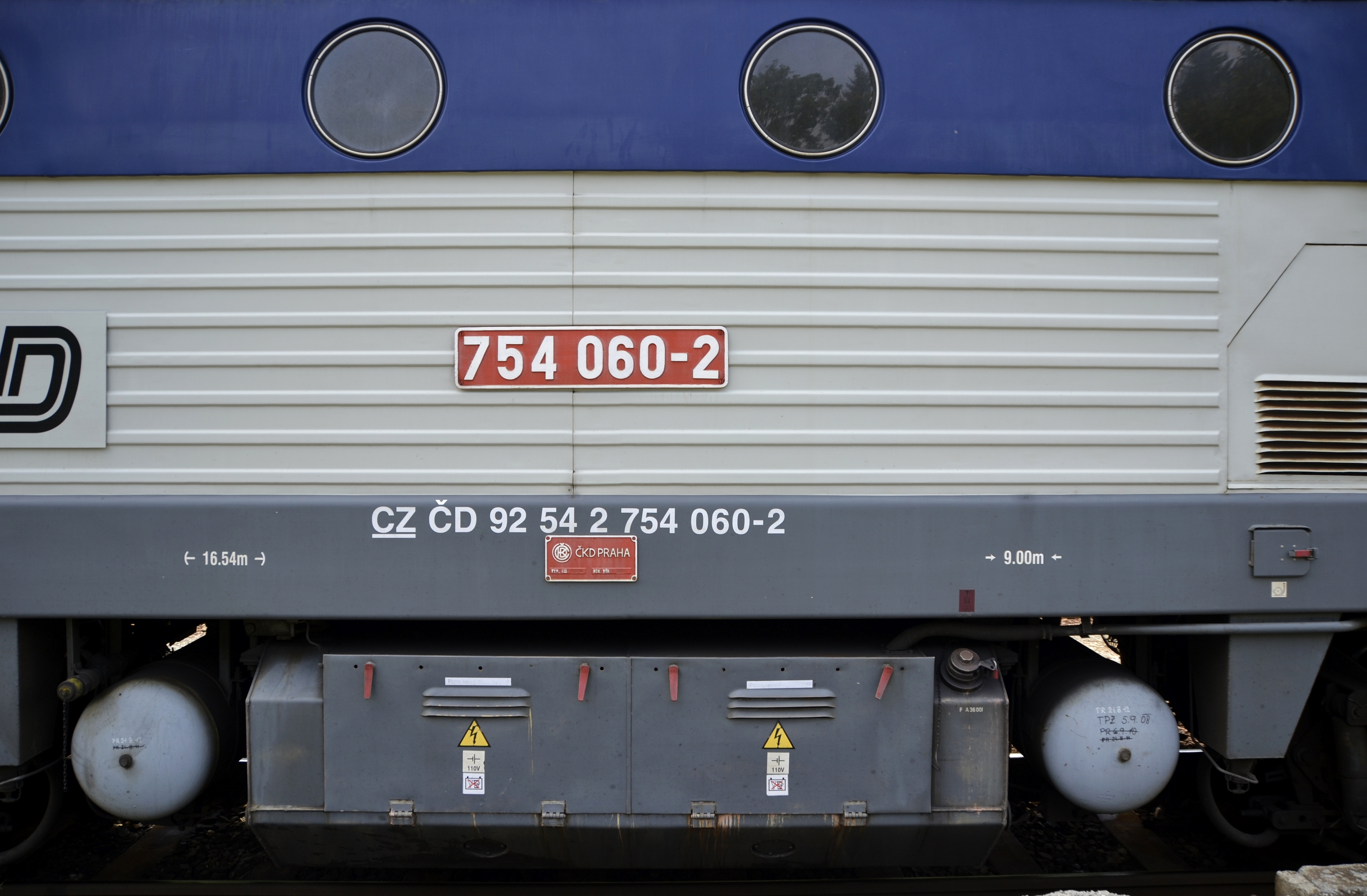
Side view detail

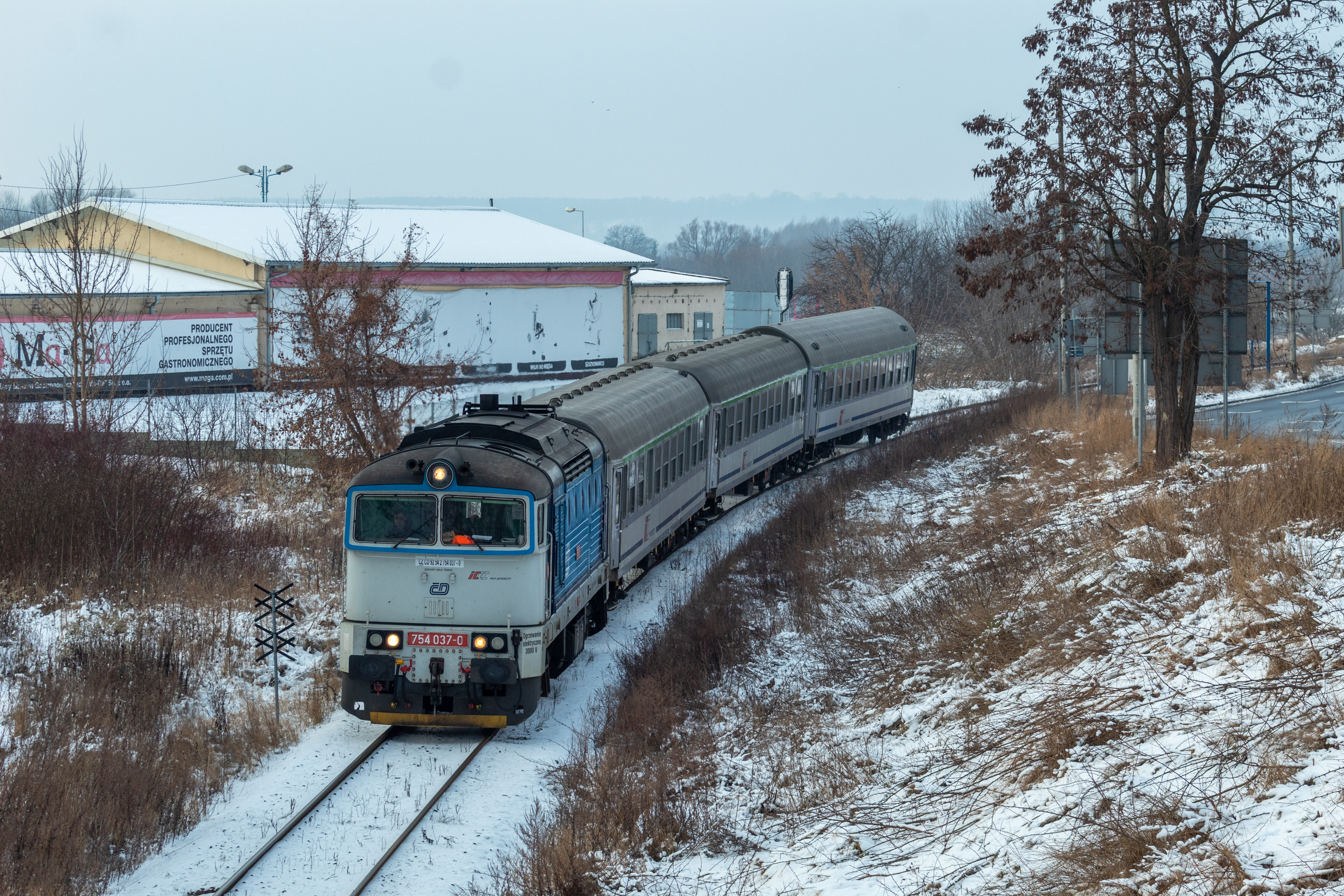
754 037-0 PKP Intercity/ČD

== In fiction ==
- The GeoTrax toy line character "Goggles" is based on the ČSD Class T 478.4. Unlike the real T 478.4s, Goggles is portrayed as a single cab locomotive rather than a dual cab locomotive.

== See also ==
- List of ČD Classes
