= Tanvald–Harrachov cog railway =

Cog railway in the Czech Republic

Coordinates: 50°44′36″N 15°18′40″E

The Tanvald–Harrachov cog railway is a standard gauge cog railway in Europe. It connects the municipalities Tanvald, Kořenov and Harrachov in the Czech Republic.

== History ==
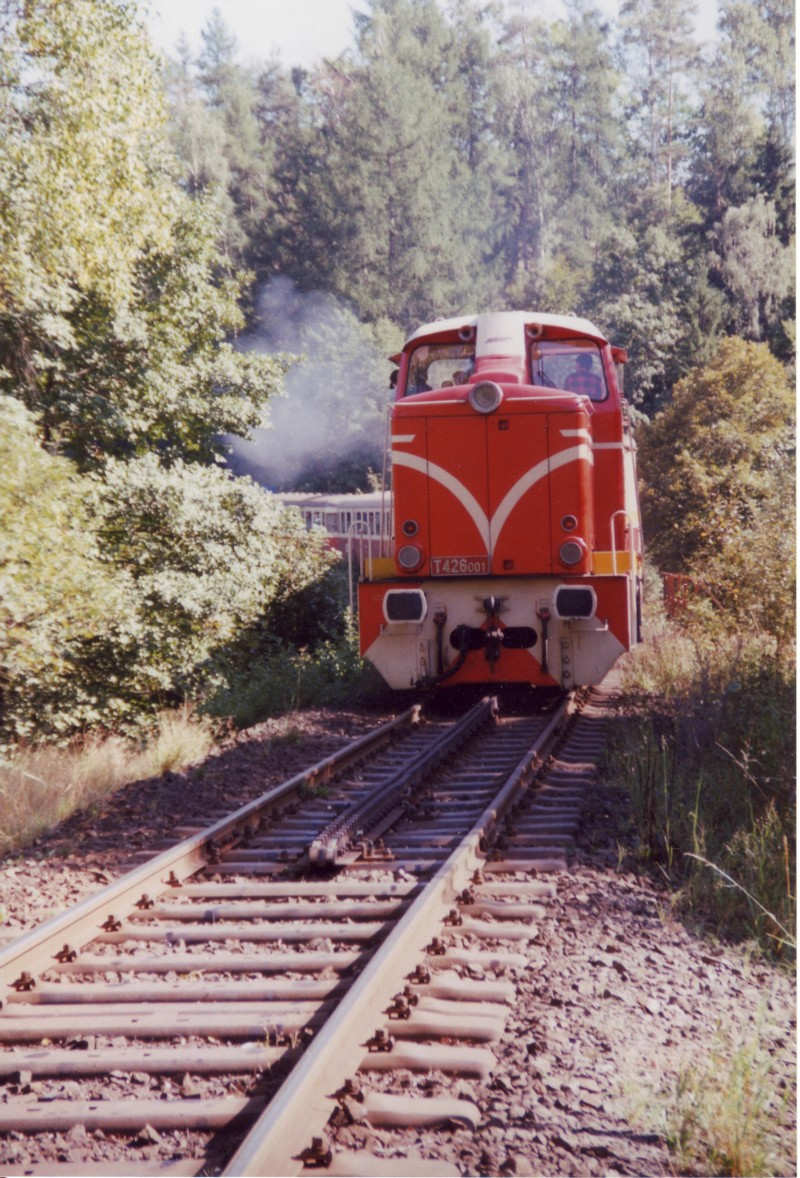
Cog locomotive T 426.0 in the second cog section

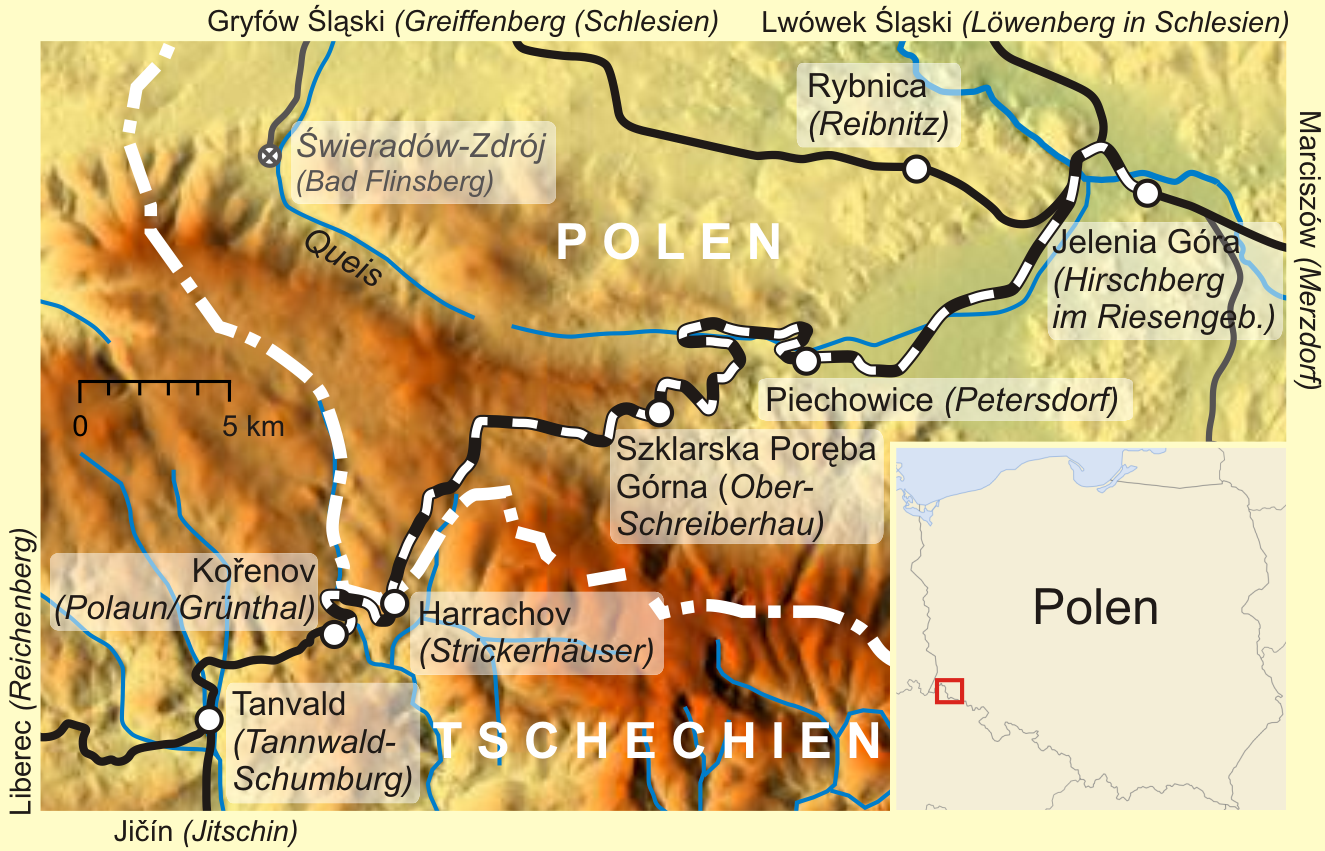
Rail transport map of Zackenbahn

The railway was built in 1902 with the intention to connect the lines Liberec–Jablonec–Tanvald and Jelenia Góra-Kořenov (Zackenbahn), that is to connect the Austro-Hungarian Empire with Prussia. After the Second World War Silesia was acquired by Poland and the cross-border traffic was abolished. Following an exchange of border territories between Czechoslovakia and Poland, the Bohemian part was extended to Harrachov, that became a new terminal station. Following a one-day celebration on the 100th anniversary in 2002, cross border traffic was restored on 2 July 2010. Plans to extend the line further to the centre of Harrachov were rejected. Despite this, the section between Harrachov and Szklarska Poręba has been reconstructed and is in regular use.

== Use ==
In winter, the morning trains are packed with cross country skiers who take advantage of the gained elevation difference and continue from Kořenov to either Jablonec nad Nisou or Liberec via Jizerka or cross the border to make a trip to Orle. In summer, the train is used by cyclists. As both the express trains from Prague and Dresden terminate in Tanvald, the former plans to abolish the line were dropped.

== Technical parameters ==
- Rack system: two-set Abt rack system, laid in two sections, 4,744 m
- Maximum gradient: 58 ‰ (Czech rail record)
- Elevation difference: 235 m on 7 km
