= Ladislav Rygl =

Ladislav Rygl may refer to:

- Ladislav Rygl Sr. (1947–2024), Czech Nordic skier who won the combined event at the 1970 FIS Nordic World Ski Championships in Vysoké Tatry
- Ladislav Rygl Jr. (born 1976), his son, who competed in Nordic combined from 1995 to 2006
