= Ejpovice =

- Municipality
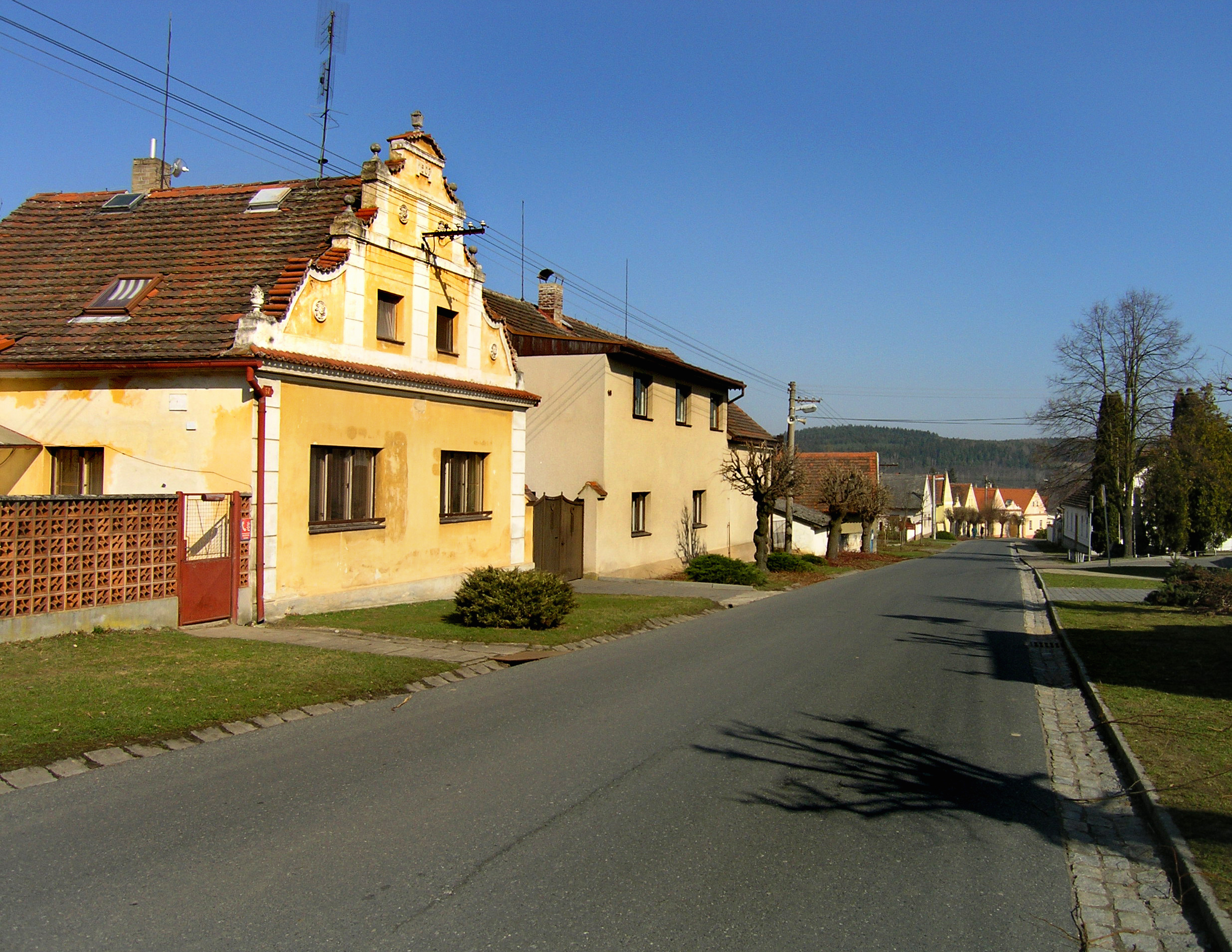
- Main street

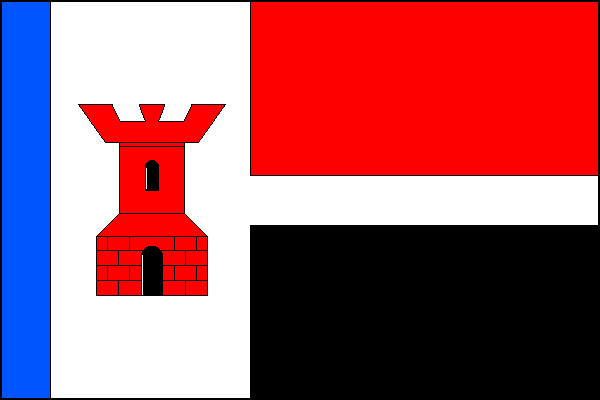
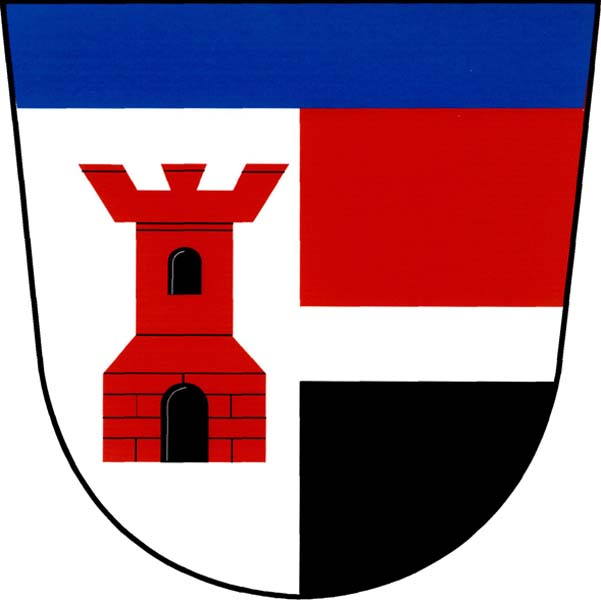
- Flag Coat of arms

- Location in the Czech Republic
- Coordinates: 49°44′46″N 13°30′52″E
- Country: Czech Republic
- Region: Plzeň
- District: Rokycany
- First mentioned: 1331

Area
  - Total: 7.72 km^{2} (2.98 sq mi)
- Elevation: 347 m (1,138 ft)

Population (2026-01-01)
  - Total: 828
  - Density: 107/km^{2} (278/sq mi)
- Time zone: UTC+1 (CET)
  - Summer (DST): UTC+2 (CEST)
- Postal code: 337 01
- Website: www.ejpovice.cz

Ejpovice is a municipality and village in Rokycany District in the Plzeň Region of the Czech Republic. It has about 800 inhabitants.

Ejpovice lies approximately 5 kilometres (3 mi) west of Rokycany, 11 km (7 mi) east of Plzeň, and 76 km (47 mi) south-west of Prague.

== Demographics ==
Historical population
Year	Pop.	±%
1869	620	—
1880	659	+6.3%
1890	699	+6.1%
1900	657	−6.0%
1910	736	+12.0%
1921	765	+3.9%
1930	910	+19.0%
1950	843	−7.4%
1961	709	−15.9%
1970	568	−19.9%
1980	533	−6.2%
1991	520	−2.4%
2001	497	−4.4%
2011	642	+29.2%
2021	748	+16.5%
Source: Censuses

== Transport ==
Ejpovice is located on the railway lines Klatovy–Beroun, Plzeň–Radnice and Přeštice–Hořovice. The Ejpovice Tunnel goes under the Chlum hill. The tunnel is 4,150 m (13,620 ft) long and is the longest railway tunnel in the Czech Republic.
