= Kořenov =

- Municipality
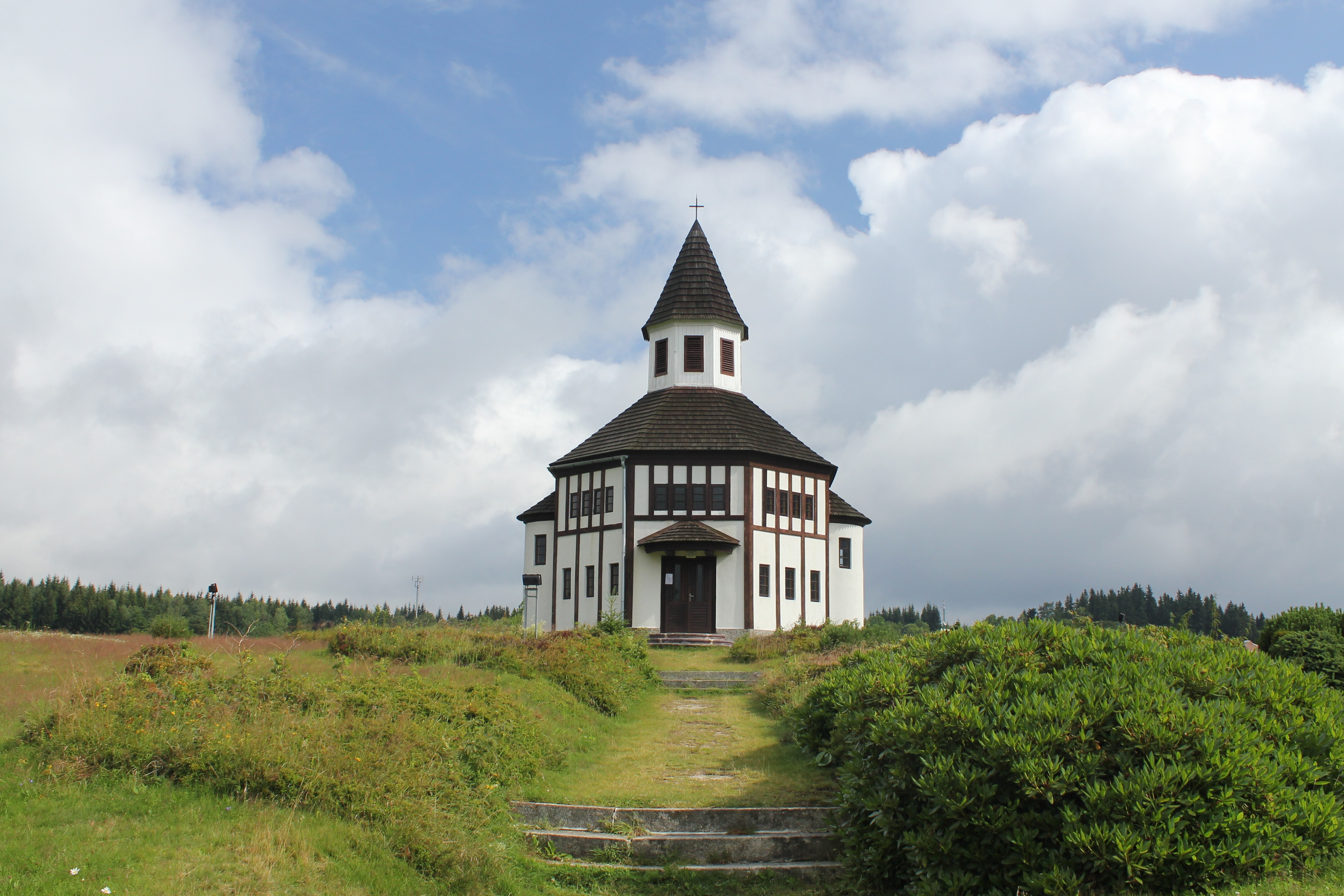
- Tesařov chapel

- Flag Coat of arms

- Location in the Czech Republic
- Coordinates: 50°45′34″N 15°21′56″E
- Country: Czech Republic
- Region: Liberec
- District: Jablonec nad Nisou
- First mentioned: 1577

Area
  - Total: 55.83 km^{2} (21.56 sq mi)
- Elevation: 725 m (2,379 ft)

Population (2026-01-01)
  - Total: 934
  - Density: 16.7/km^{2} (43.3/sq mi)
- Time zone: UTC+1 (CET)
  - Summer (DST): UTC+2 (CEST)
- Postal codes: 468 48, 468 49, 468 50
- Website: www.korenov.cz

Kořenov (German: Wurzelsdorf) is a municipality and village in Jablonec nad Nisou District in the Liberec Region of the Czech Republic. It has about 900 inhabitants. It lies in the Jizera Mountains.

== Administrative division ==
Kořenov consists of five municipal parts (in brackets population according to the 2021 census):

- Kořenov (393)
- Jizerka (18)
- Polubný (166)
- Příchovice (253)
- Rejdice (34)

== Etymology ==
The village was probably named after the hill Kořenov. The name of the hill was derived either from the personal name Kořen or from the word kořen, i.e. 'root' (meaning "a hill full of tree roots"). The German name Wurzelsdorf, meaning 'root village', was created by translation of the Czech name.

== Geography ==
Kořenov is located about 13 kilometres (8 mi) east of Jablonec nad Nisou and 20 km (12 mi) east of Liberec, on the border with Poland. It lies in the Jizera Mountains and in the eponymous protected landscape area. The highest point is the mountain Černý vrch at 1,025 m (3,363 ft) above sea level. The Jizera River forms here the entire Czech–Polish border and then shortly crosses the territory of Kořenov. The Černá Desná Stream originates in the woods in the northwestern part of the municipality.

=== Climate ===
Climate data for Kořenov-Jizerka, 1991–2020 normals, extremes 2009–present
Month	Jan	Feb	Mar	Apr	May	Jun	Jul	Aug	Sep	Oct	Nov	Dec	Year
Record high °C (°F)	10.1 (50.2)	14.5 (58.1)	17.9 (64.2)	23.4 (74.1)	25.8 (78.4)	29.9 (85.8)	31.5 (88.7)	31.8 (89.2)	28.8 (83.8)	24.0 (75.2)	16.8 (62.2)	9.4 (48.9)	31.8 (89.2)
Mean daily maximum °C (°F)	−1.1 (30.0)	0.1 (32.2)	4.2 (39.6)	10.1 (50.2)	14.1 (57.4)	18.3 (64.9)	20.2 (68.4)	20.3 (68.5)	15.2 (59.4)	10.1 (50.2)	5.1 (41.2)	0.5 (32.9)	9.8 (49.6)
Daily mean °C (°F)	−4.3 (24.3)	−3.6 (25.5)	−0.7 (30.7)	4.0 (39.2)	8.7 (47.7)	12.8 (55.0)	14.2 (57.6)	13.5 (56.3)	8.9 (48.0)	5.5 (41.9)	1.7 (35.1)	−2.2 (28.0)	4.9 (40.8)
Mean daily minimum °C (°F)	−7.8 (18.0)	−7.8 (18.0)	−5.4 (22.3)	−2.4 (27.7)	1.6 (34.9)	5.5 (41.9)	6.3 (43.3)	5.8 (42.4)	2.8 (37.0)	1.3 (34.3)	−1.6 (29.1)	−5.4 (22.3)	−0.6 (30.9)
Record low °C (°F)	−28.6 (−19.5)	−35.3 (−31.5)	−26.2 (−15.2)	−22.0 (−7.6)	−13.1 (8.4)	−4.5 (23.9)	−3.5 (25.7)	−4.0 (24.8)	−8.9 (16.0)	−12.7 (9.1)	−22.1 (−7.8)	−31.4 (−24.5)	−35.3 (−31.5)
Average precipitation mm (inches)	103.6 (4.08)	75.2 (2.96)	94.3 (3.71)	54.9 (2.16)	92.2 (3.63)	114.2 (4.50)	135.0 (5.31)	112.1 (4.41)	92.8 (3.65)	106.9 (4.21)	89.8 (3.54)	110.4 (4.35)	1,181.3 (46.51)
Average snowfall cm (inches)	54.9 (21.6)	54.7 (21.5)	59.9 (23.6)	25.2 (9.9)	1.0 (0.4)	0.0 (0.0)	0.0 (0.0)	0.0 (0.0)	1.5 (0.6)	8.7 (3.4)	32.3 (12.7)	68.3 (26.9)	306.4 (120.6)
Average relative humidity (%)	93.9	89.5	85.0	79.3	78.4	78.6	79.4	82.3	86.7	88.2	92.6	94.7	85.7
Mean monthly sunshine hours	36.6	58.3	125.0	173.6	178.1	192.3	205.2	194.6	142.3	97.7	47.9	31.7	1,483.3
Source: Czech Hydrometeorological Institute

== History ==
The first settlers came to the remote forested area in northern Bohemia in 1577 when Paul Schürer von Walthaimb established one of the oldest glassworks in the region at Rejdice. The glassworks operated until 1720. After the 1620 Battle of White Mountain, the lands were seized by Albrecht von Wallenstein, who sold them to the comital Desfours dynasty. In the 18th century, German colonists came to this region. The estates were acquired by the noble House of Rohan in 1824.

In 1902, the Tanvald–Kořenov cog railway connecting to the electrified Izera railway line running to Silesian Hirschberg (present-day Jelenia Góra) was put into operation.

The German-speaking population was expelled after 1945.

The municipality was established in 1960 by the merger of the former market towns of Polubný and Příchovice with Rejdice and Jizerka. Kořenov was only an administrative part of Polubný, however the new municipality adopted its name.

Part of Kořenov, the former hamlet of Údolí Naděje (Hoffnungstal, Polish: Zieleniec), belonged to Poland between 1945 and 1958. As part of the interstate agreement on territorial exchange, the territory then fell to Czechoslovakia.

== Demographics ==
Historical population

Year	Pop.	±%
1869	7,935	—
1880	8,315	+4.8%
1890	9,011	+8.4%
1900	9,828	+9.1%
1910	9,750	−0.8%

Year	Pop.	±%
1921	7,851	−19.5%
1930	8,142	+3.7%
1950	2,674	−67.2%
1961	1,810	−32.3%
1970	1,512	−16.5%

Year	Pop.	±%
1980	1,247	−17.5%
1991	1,022	−18.0%
2001	1,028	+0.6%
2011	956	−7.0%
2021	864	−9.6%

Source: Censuses

== Transport ==
Kořenov is located on the railway line Liberec–Szklarska Poręba.

== Sights ==
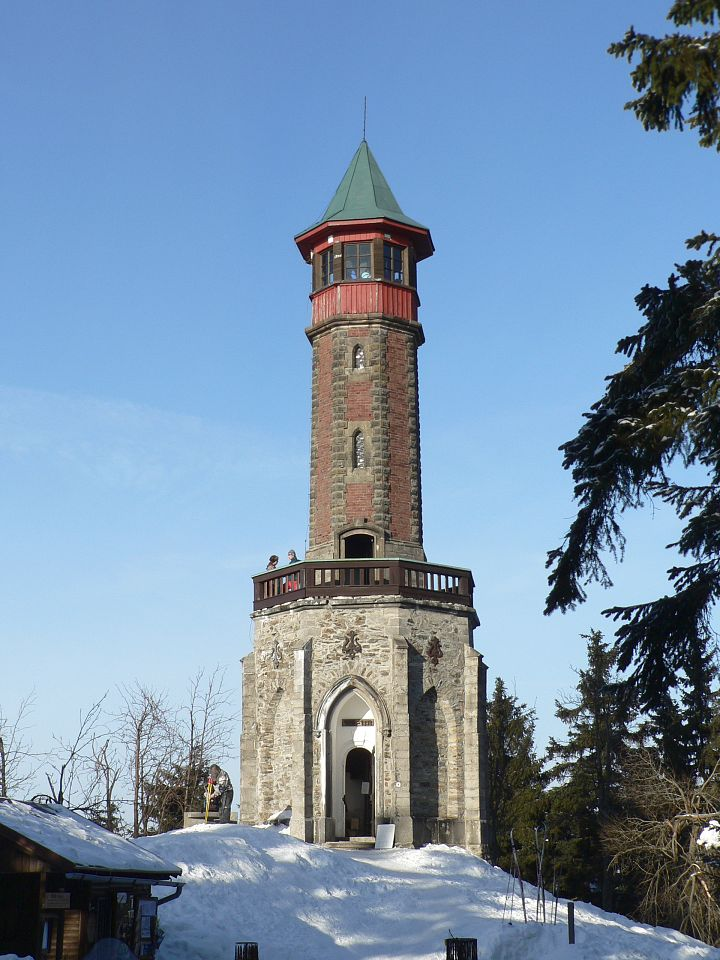
Štěpánka Tower

Štěpánka is the oldest observation tower in the Jizera Mountains. It was built on Hvězda mountain (959 m (3,146 ft)) in 1847. The tower is 24 m (79 ft) high and belongs to the most popular tourist destinations in the mountain range.

Tesařov chapel is a protestant chapel, built according to plans of Otto Bartning in 1909. Today si is used by the Moravian Church.

The Church of Saint John in Polubný was built in 1789–1793. It is a Neoclassical building with Neoromanesque interiors.

The Tanvald–Harrachov cog railway runs through Kořenov. It was built in 1899–1902. It is known for the steepest gradient of a railway in the country (up to 58 ‰) and for the Polubenský Tunnel, which belongs to the longest in the country with a length of 940 m (3,080 ft).

== Notable people ==
- Berthold Bartosch (1893–1968), film director
- Rudolf Burkert (1904–1985), skier
- Claus Josef Riedel (1925–2004), glassmaker
- Ladislav Rygl Sr. (born 1947), skier
