= Czech rail records =

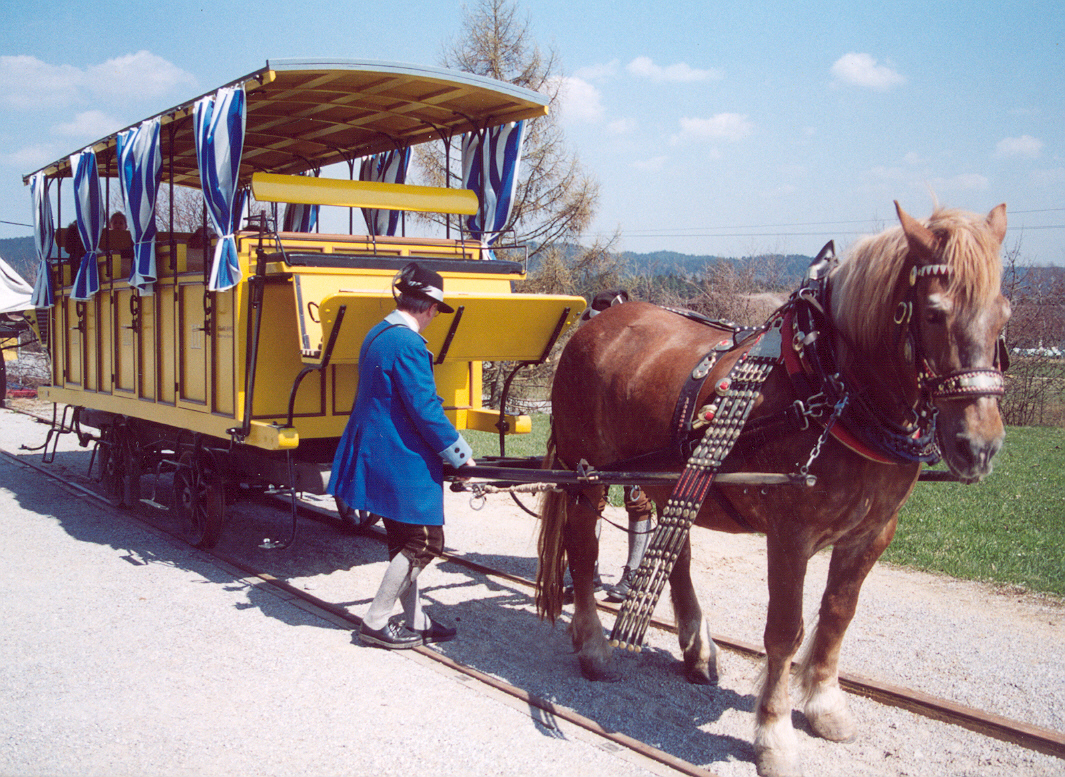
Reconstructed portion of the České Budějovice–Linz railway in Austria

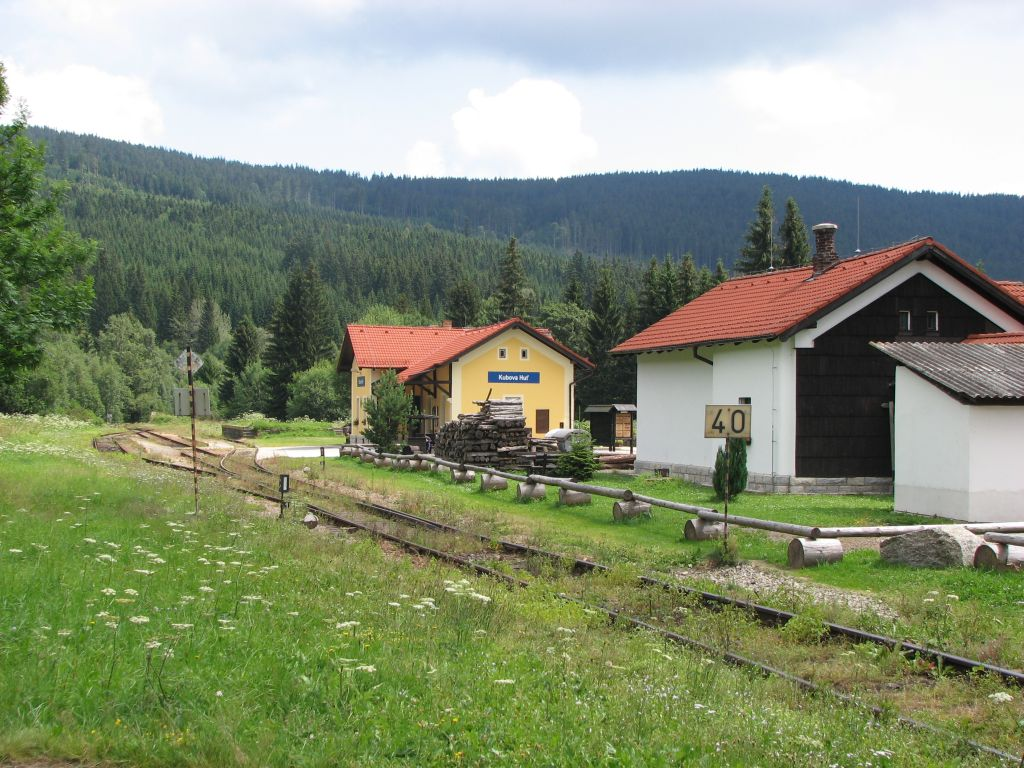
Kubova Huť, the highest railway station

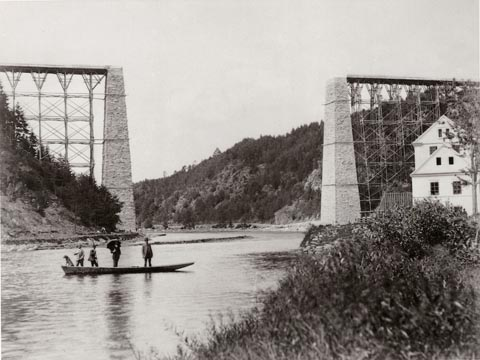
Viaduct Červená nad Vltavou under construction (1889)

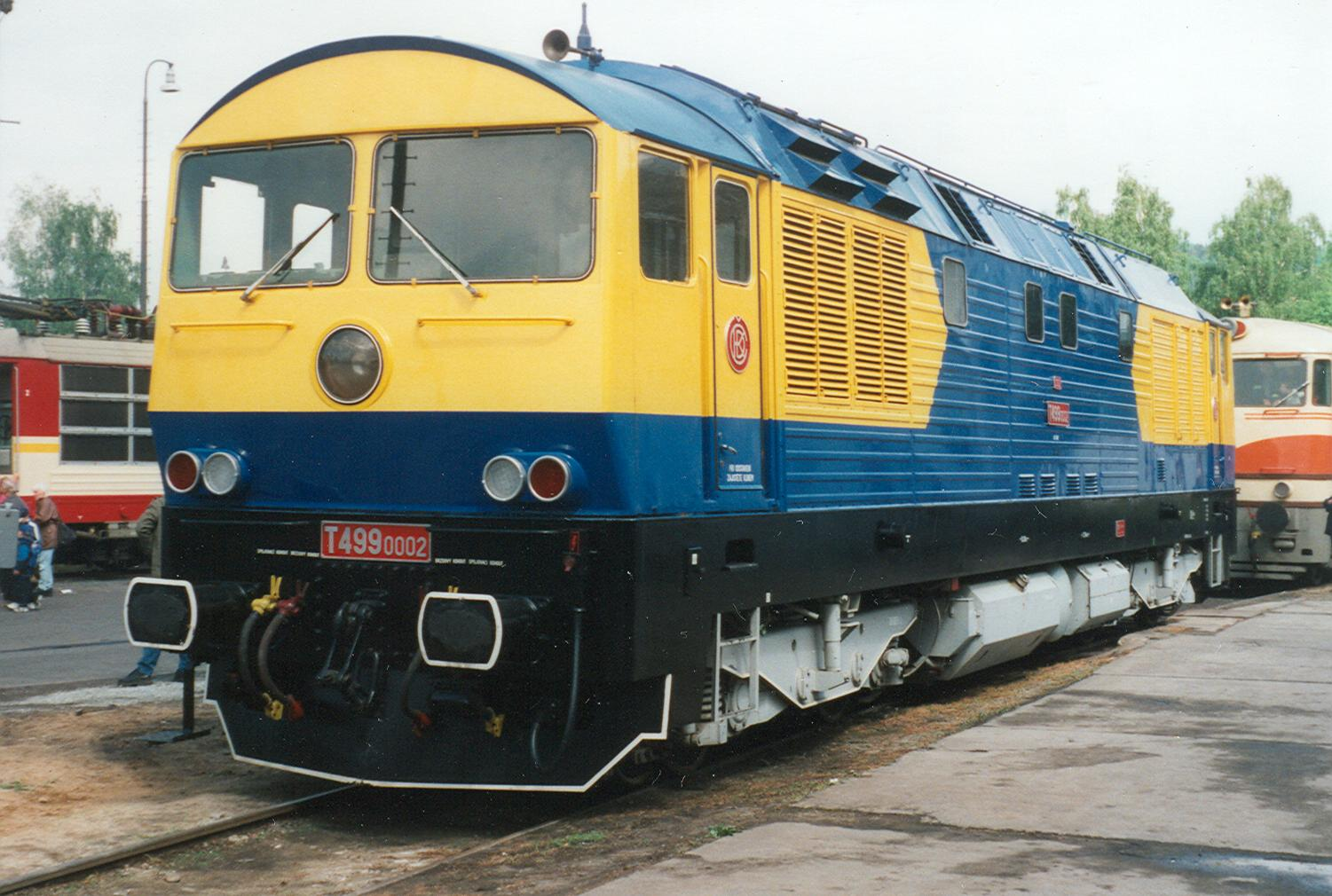
Locomotive T 499.0002 (759.002)

This is the list of Czech rail records. Dates in brackets indicate when the record was reached or when the railway infrastructure was put into operation.

First horse-drawn railway
Railway České Budějovice–Linz, first public railway in continental Europe, with length 120 km and rail gauge 1,106 mm (3 ft 7 1/2 in), section České Budějovice–Kerschbaum put into operation on 30 September 1828, the rest opened on 1 August 1832.

First railway (steam powered)
First section of the North railway from Vienna to Břeclav and its branch from Břeclav to Brno (7 July 1839)

Maximum gradient of a rail line
Gradient 58 ‰ on cog railway Tanvald–Kořenov (30 June 1902)

The lowest railway station
Station Dolní Žleb, 127 m above sea level, on cross-border line Děčín–Bad Schandau in valley of the Elbe River (8 April 1851)

The highest railway station
Station Kubova Huť, 995 m (3,264 ft) above sea level, on line Strakonice–Volary (15 October 1893)

The longest tunnel
Ejpovice Tunnel, 4,150 m (13,620 ft) long, on line Prague–Plzeň (15 November 2018)

The longest bridge/viaduct
Negrelli Viaduct (also called Karlín Viaduct), 1,111 m (3,645 ft) long, on rail section Prague Masaryk station-Prague Bubny (1 June 1850)

Bridge with the highest span
Míru Bridge (Dolní Loučky), span 110 m, line Břeclav–Havlíčkův Brod (20 December 1953)

The highest bridge/viaduct
Viaduct Červená nad Vltavou, 68 m high, line Tábor–Ražice (21 November 1889)

The highest operating line speed
Speed 200 km/h in sections of transit corridors

The fastest electric rail vehicle
Unit ČD 680.001 Pendolino reached top speed 237 km/h between Brno and Břeclav (18 November 2004)

The fastest electric locomotive
Locomotive 469.4 ČSD, reached top speed 219 km/h on the Velim railway test circuit (5 September 1972). Czech built locomotive Škoda Chs200 reach top speed 262 km/h on Oktyabrskaya Railway in Russia (2 December 2006).

The fastest diesel rail vehicle
Locomotive T 499.0002 (759.002), nicknamed Cyclop, reached top speed 178 km/h on the Velim railway test circuit (21 July 1975)

The fastest steam locomotive
Locomotive 498.106 ČSD, nicknamed Albatross, reached top speed 162 km/h on the Velim railway test circuit (27 August 1964)
