= Střemchoví =

Coordinates: 49°21′42″N 16°22′3″E

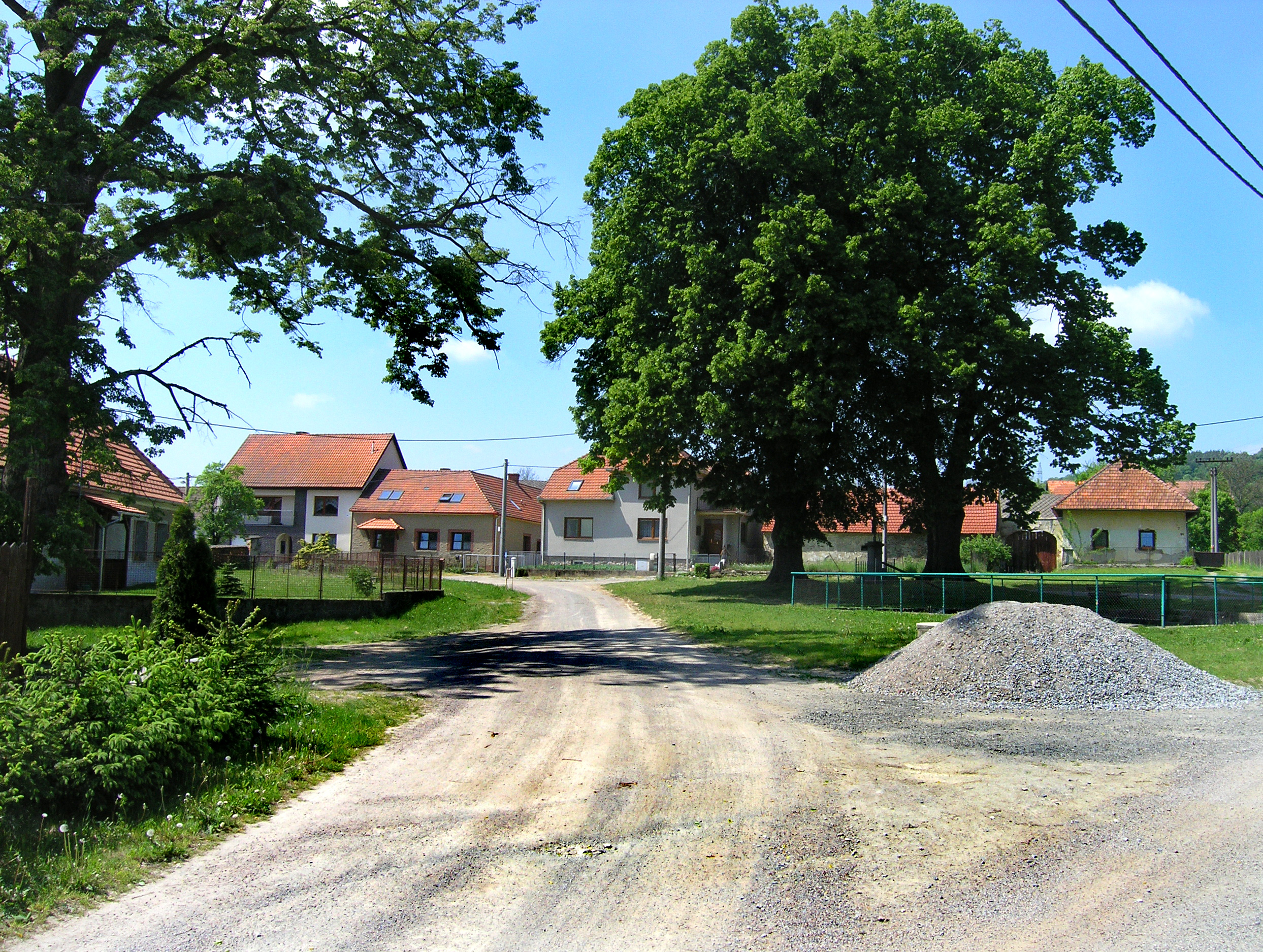
Střemchoví, the common

Střemchoví is a village and administrative part of Dolní Loučky in Brno-Country District in the South Moravian Region of the Czech Republic.

2811 Střemchoví, an asteroid, was named after this village.

== Notable people ==
- Antonín Mrkos (1918–1996), astronomer

== Gallery ==
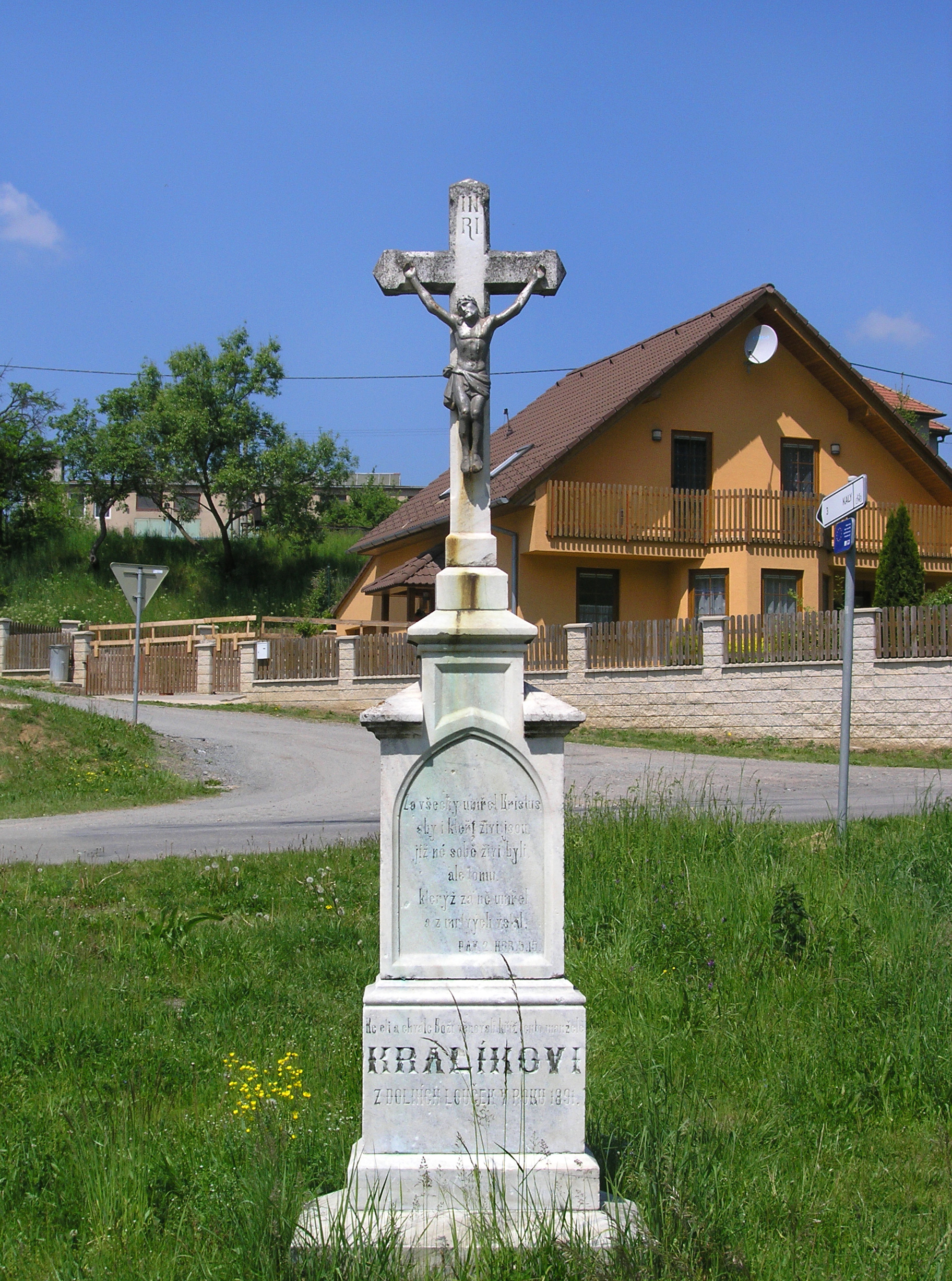
The crucifix

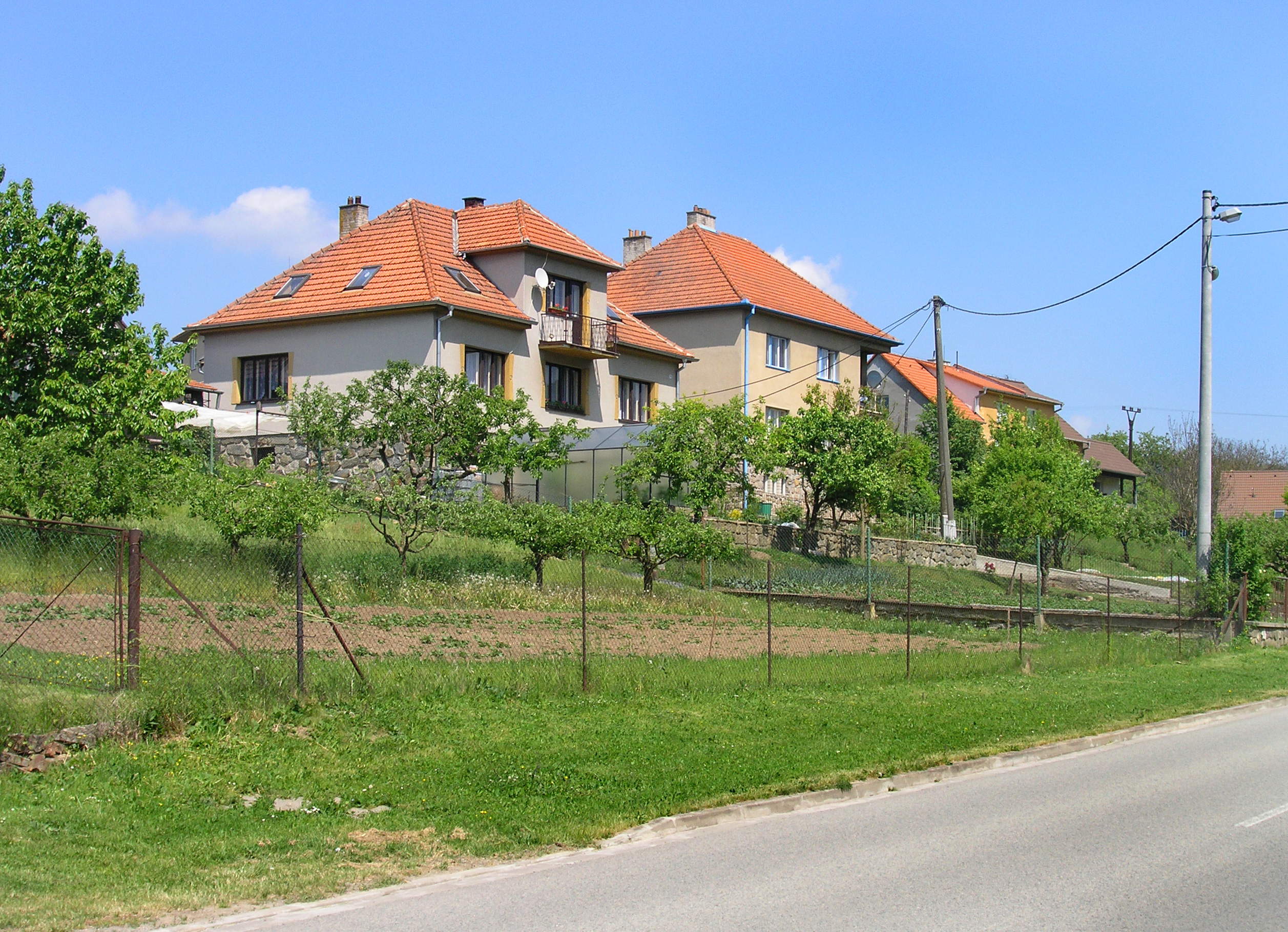
West part
