= ČSD Class T478.3 =

Czechoslovak diesel-electric locomotives (1968–1977)

ČSD T478.3
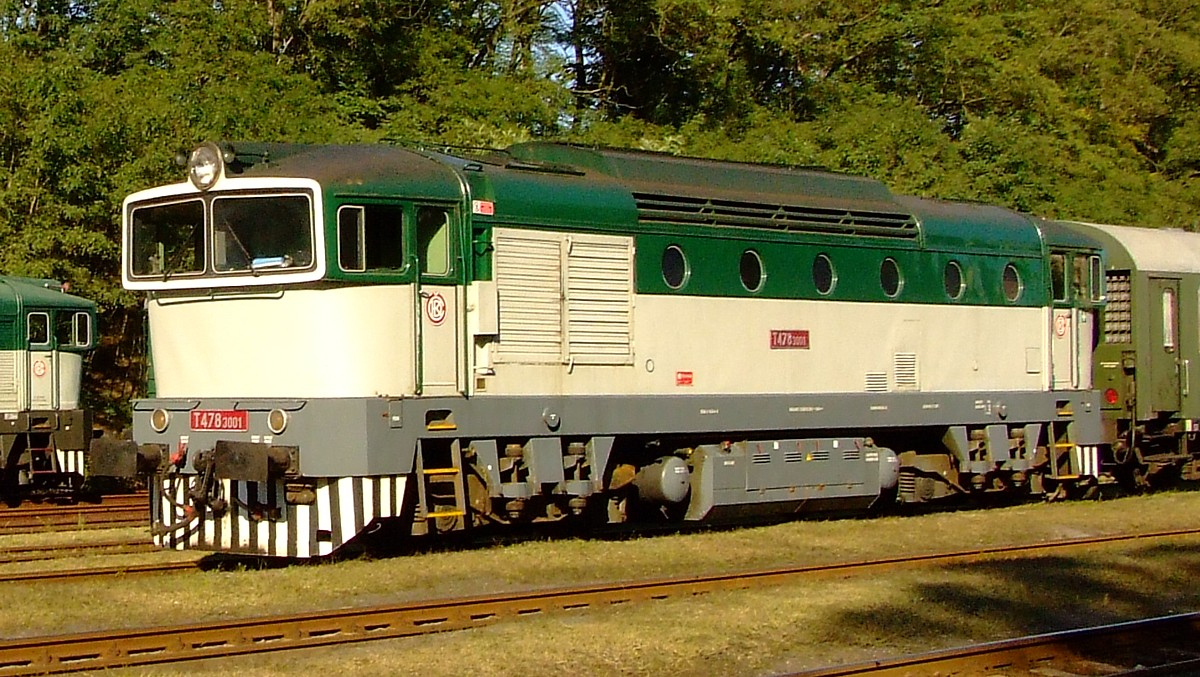
- T478.3001, the first prototype
Type and origin
- Power type: Diesel–electric
- Builder: ČKD
- Build date: 1968 - 1977
- Total produced: 408
Specifications
- Configuration
  - UIC: Bo′Bo′
- Gauge: 1,435 mm (4 ft 8 1/2 in) standard gauge
- Wheel diameter: 1,000 mm (39.37 in)
- Minimum curve: 100 m (328.08 ft)
- Wheelbase
  - Bogie: 2,400 mm (7 ft 10 1/2 in)
- Pivot centres: 9,000 mm (29 ft 6 3/8 in)
- Length: 16,500 mm (54 ft 1 5/8 in)
- Width: 3,074 mm (10 ft 1 in)
- Height: 4,335 mm (14 ft 2 5/8 in)
- Axle load: 18 t (18 long tons; 20 short tons)
- Loco weight: 73 t (72 long tons; 80 short tons)
- Fuel type: Diesel
- Fuel capacity: 2,500 L (550 imp gal; 660 US gal)
- Prime mover: ČKD K 12 V 230 DR
- RPM
  - Maximum RPM: 1100 rpm
- Engine type: Four-stroke V12 diesel
- Aspiration: Twin-turbocharger
- Generator: ČKD TD 802 E
- Traction motors: ČKD TE 005
- Cylinder size: 230 mm (9.1 in)
- Transmission: Electrical
- Train heating: Steam
- Loco brake: Air
- Train brakes: Air
- Air tank cap.: 1,000 L (220 imp gal; 260 US gal)
Performance figures
- Maximum speed: 100 km/h (62 mph)
- Power output: 1,325 kW (1,777 hp)
- Tractive effort
  - Starting: 215 kN (48,000 lbf)
  - Continuous: 123 kN (28,000 lbf)
Career
- Nicknames: Brejlovec

T478.3 is a class of locomotives built for Czechoslovak State Railways to replace the most powerful steam locomotives (such as 477.0, 475.1 or 498.1) in heavy passenger and freight service. Their design is based on the type T478.1; the main difference is the new, more powerful V12 diesel engine.

== History ==
In the 1960s, the number of powerful diesel locomotives for mainline service in the former Czechoslovakia was still insufficient. The T478.1 class performed well, but they were less powerful than the heaviest passenger steam locomotives. The new type of locomotive was to be equipped with a V12 diesel engine of a newly developed class with 230 mm bore. The new engine was able to run at higher RPM and thus develop more power at the output of the traction generator at high locomotive speeds than the older designs. The engines were expected to be produced in I6, I8, V12 and V16 configuration with as much as 2 817 kW power output. Only the I6 and V12 configuration entered mass production. I8 was made only as a prototype, V16 was never produced.

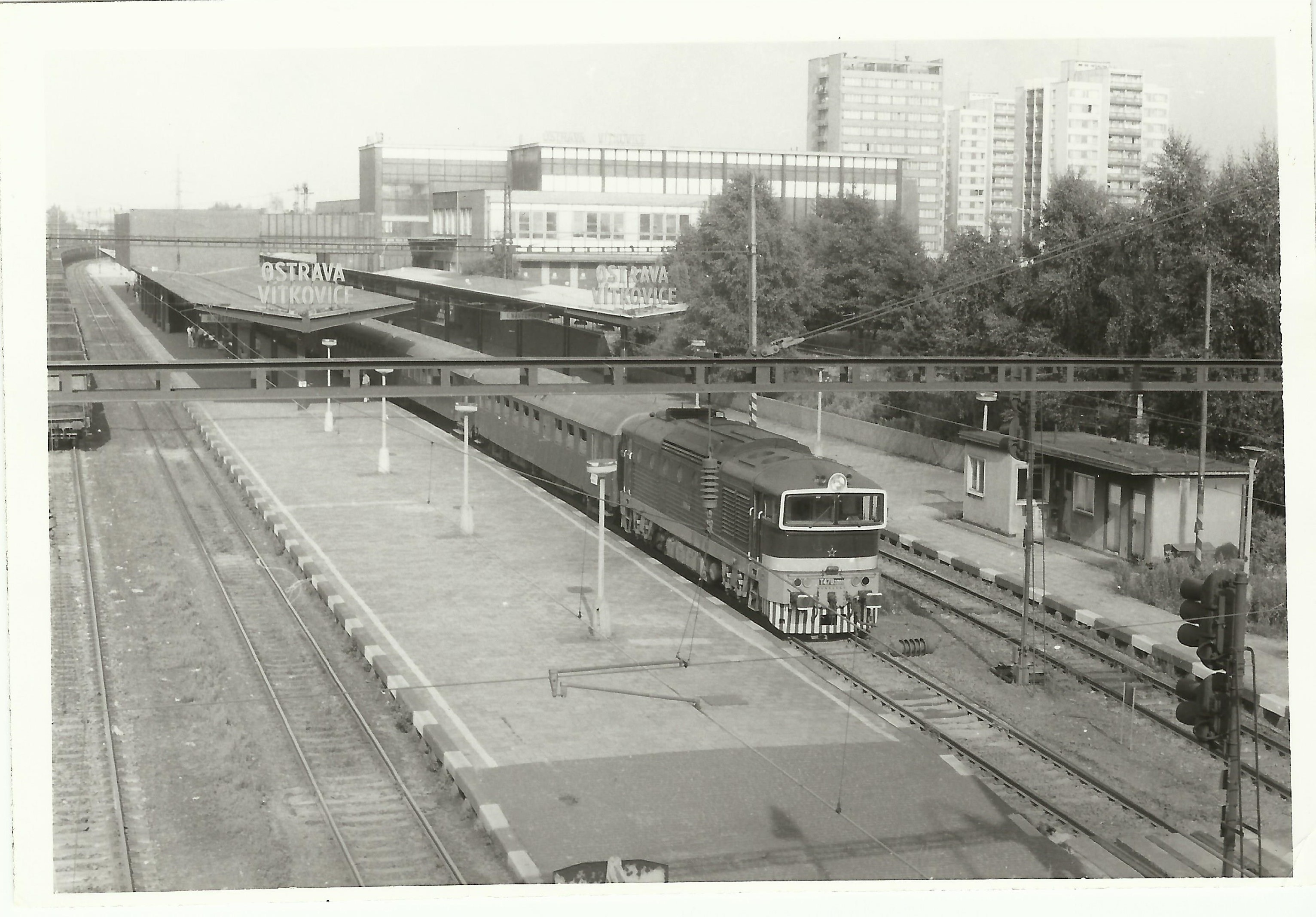
In Ostrava,1986

The first two prototypes of the T478.3 class, T478.3001 and 3002, were finished in the middle of 1968 and were immediately put into heavy testing. The first prototype had a prototype diesel with 220 mm bore, which was soon replaced with a new one with standard 230 mm bore, set to 1470 kW output power. The gear ratio of the traction motors was modified and the maximum speed increased to 120 km/h. These modifications have shown excessive wear to the components and were removed after the end of the trials. The prototypes could be distinguished by the use of plain metal on the locomotive body. Corrugated metal was used on series production locomotives.

The pre-production series of ten locomotives was manufactured in 1970 and regular series were supplied since the end of 1971. The last locomotive was delivered in 1978.

== Operation ==
The new locomotives were immediately put into the most demanding operations, previously served by the most powerful steam locomotives. Soon, serious problems arose, mostly electric equipment flashovers and diesel engine failures. The situation was so bad that some of the already withdrawn steam locomotives had to be put back into service. For this reason, regular passenger steam services continued until 1978. After some modifications, the T478.3 became reliable, although they required more thorough maintenance than the older T478.1. in 1988, the numbering system changed and the locomotives were assigned Class 753.

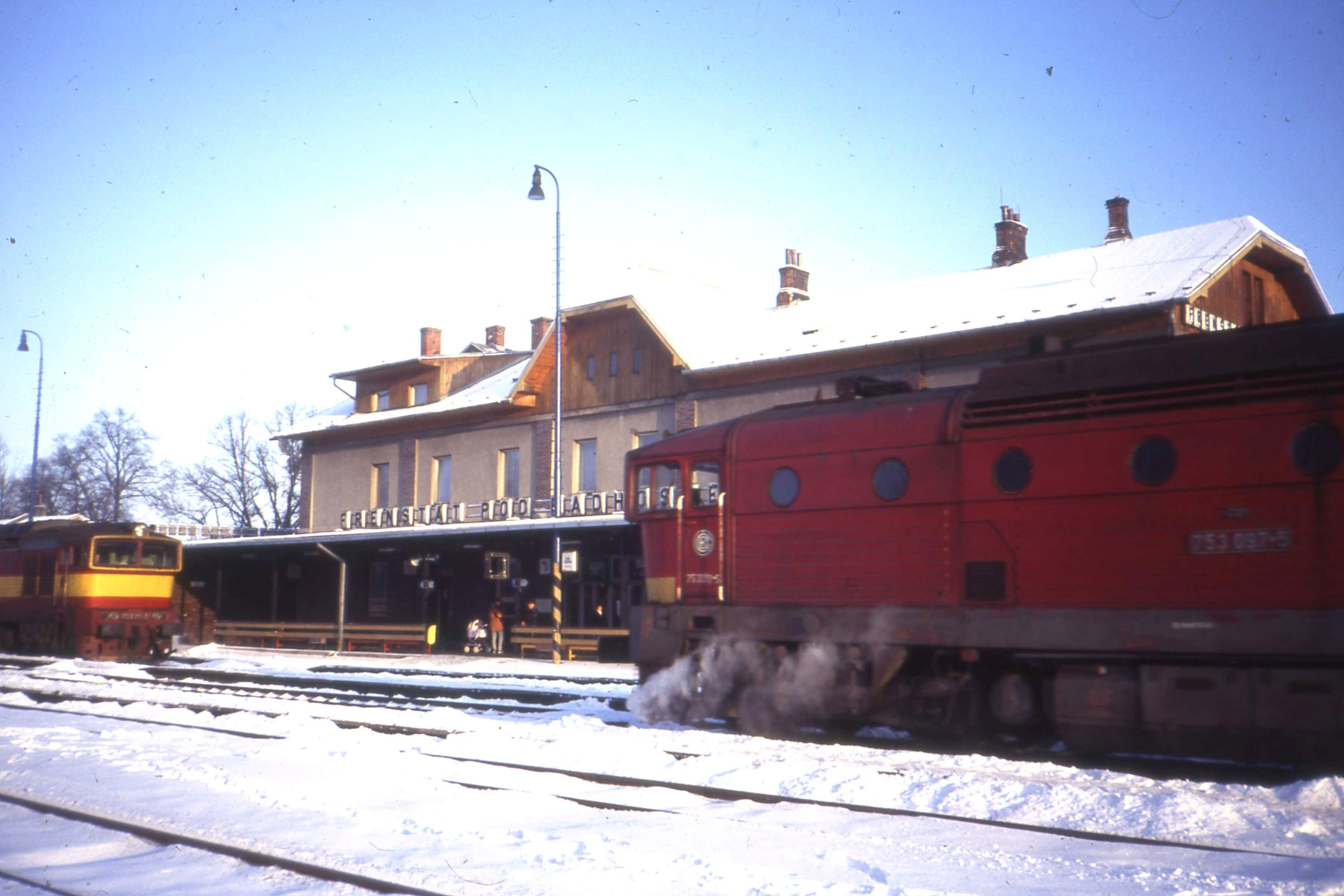
The steam-heating era

At the beginning of the 1990s, the ČSD decided to switch from steam train heating to the much more convenient electric heating. The only diesel locomotives capable of the electric heating were the 754 class. It was decided to rebuild some of the steam-heating diesels to electric heating. Since 1991, 163 machines of the Class 753 had been equipped with an electric heating alternator instead of the steam generator and renumbered to Class 750. The locomotives kept their operating numbers. The steam heating has not been used since the end of the 1990s and the remaining locomotives of the original class continued to be used in freight transport.

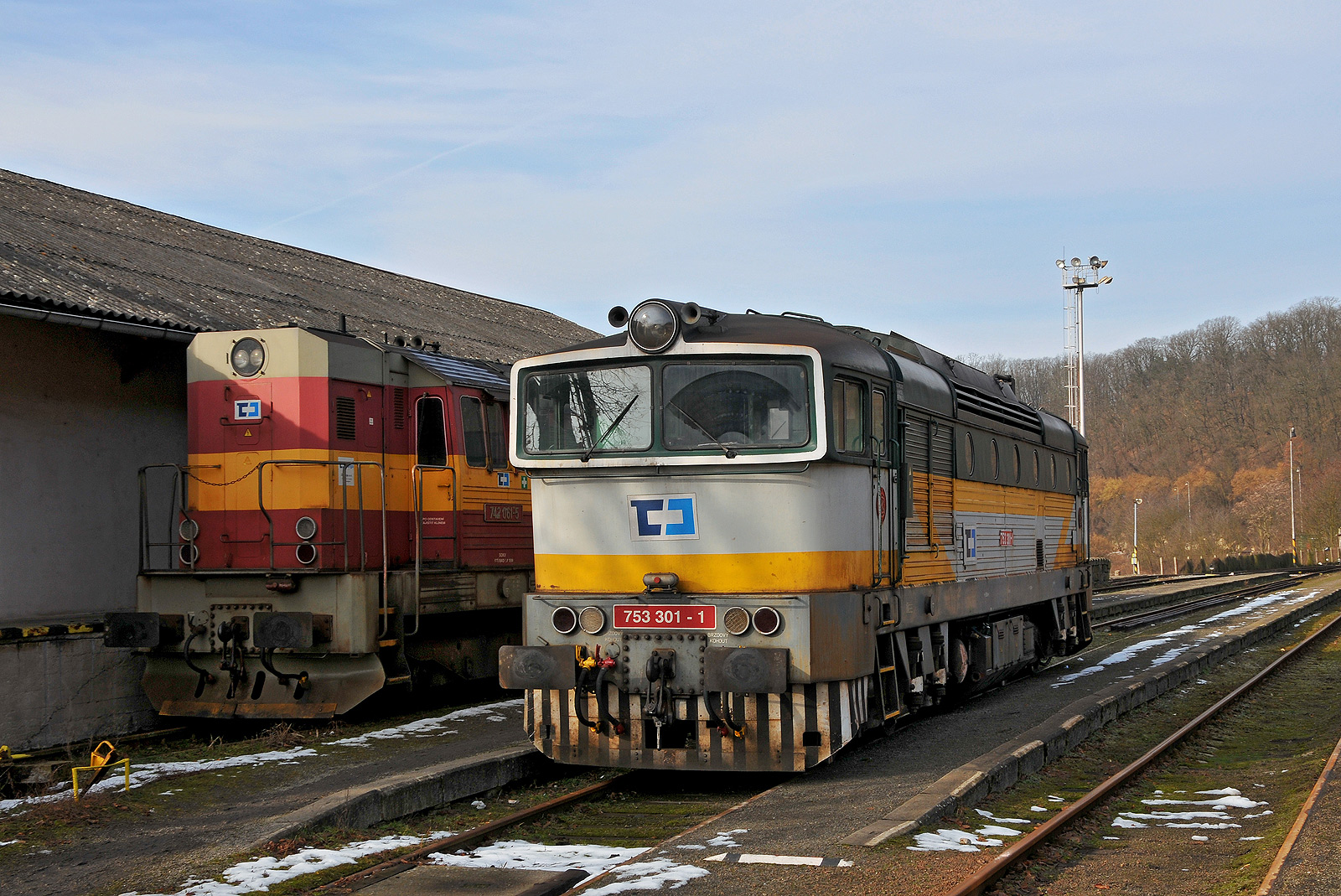
753.301

As the electrification of the rail network proceeded, the need for powerful diesel locomotives decreased and the rail operator preferred the less powerful, but more rugged and fuel-efficient 751 class. Since the 1990s, the 753 class has been gradually withdrawn both in the Czech Republic and Slovakia and either reconstructed, stored for future use or scrapped. Since 2011, only a single locomotive of the original class, 753.301, remained in regular operations of the national freight operator ČD Cargo. As of April 2020, it is still operational and used in freight service in northeastern Bohemia. A few other non-reconstructed locomotives, including the first prototype, are preserved as museum units.

== Reconstructions ==
=== Class 750 ===
Since 1991, 163 locomotives of the original class have been equipped with 3000 V electric train heating generator to satisfy the growing need for head-end power for new passenger cars. The locomotives received numerous other modifications to enhance their reliability and performance. Many of them have had their bogies modified to a new type of main frame suspension. As the network electrification continued, the demand for the locomotives soon decreased. Some of the locomotives have been withdrawn after a few years of service. Czech Railways have withdrawn the last locomotive from the passenger service in 2014. As of April 2020, some units of this class are still in use in freight transport by ČD Cargo and some private operators. The Slovak national operator Železničná spoločnosť Slovensko uses a few of them in passenger service.

=== Class 755 (ŽSR) ===
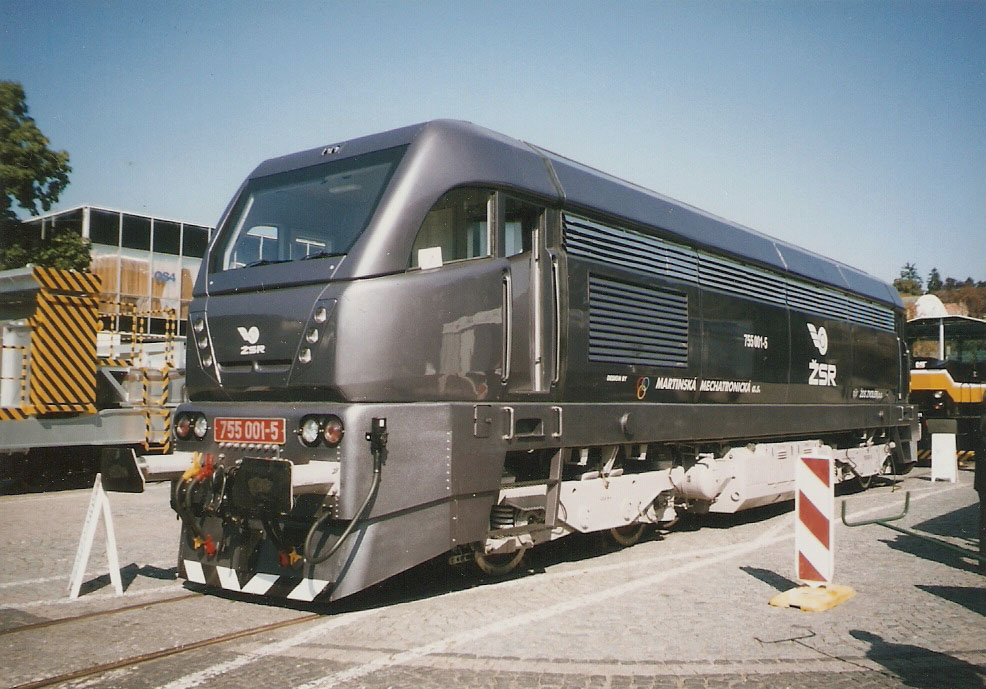
755 ŽSR

A complete reconstruction of a single locomotive was done in the middle 1990s in Slovakia. The locomotive received an entirely new composite body, a Pielstick 12 PA 4 - 185 engine set to 1470 kW, a traction alternator and rectifier and a new control system. The whole project has been plagued by corruption reaching the top government officials. The locomotive has never been put into a fully operational order and after few trials, the whole project has been cancelled. The locomotive has been kept in storage until today.

=== Class 752 (Czech Republic), D 752 (Italy) ===
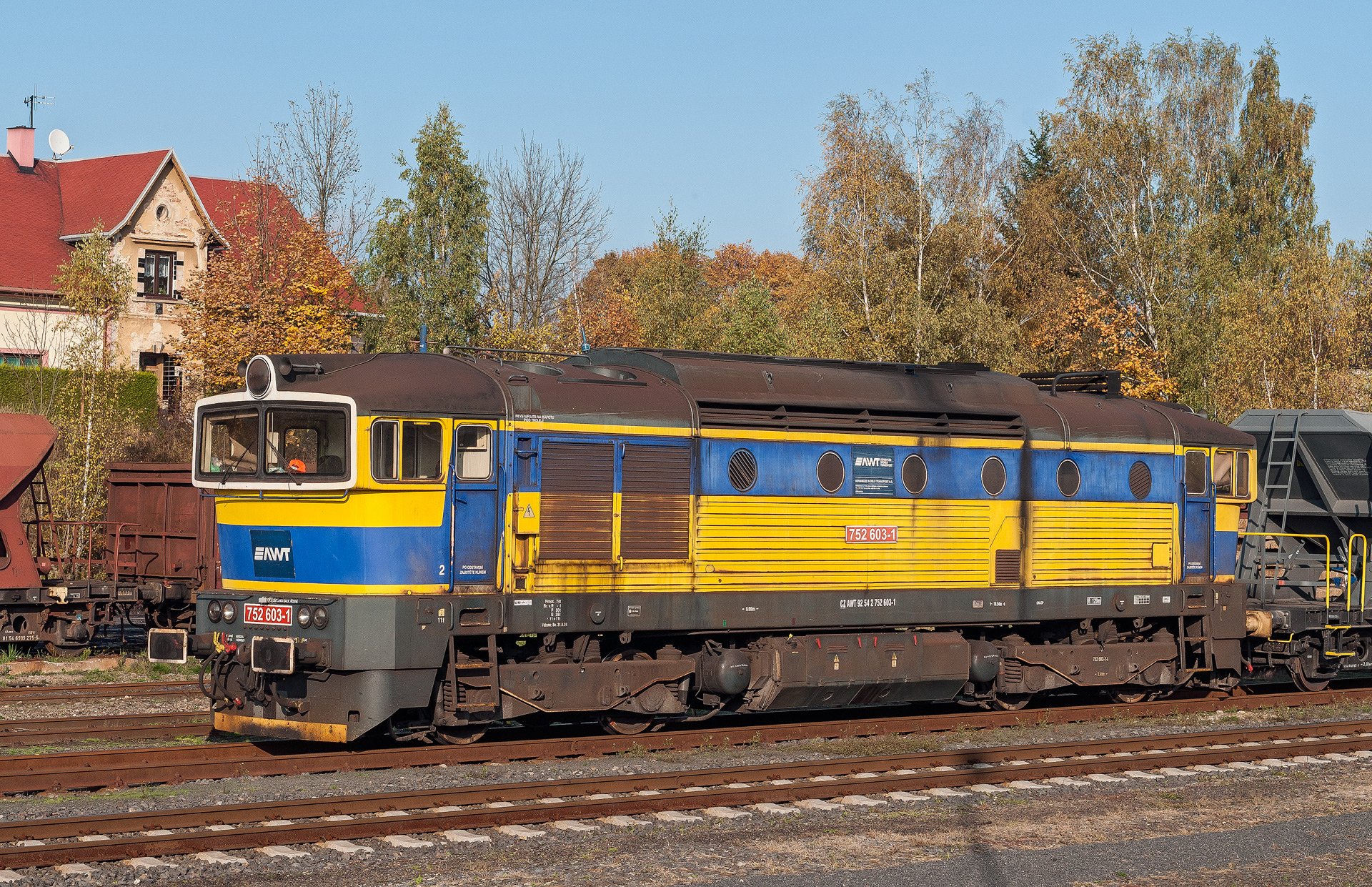
Private 752 in the Czech Republic

In 1996, one locomotive of the original 753 class has been fitted with a K 6 S 310 DR engine recovered from a withdrawn 770/771 locomotive and assigned Class 752. The aim was to replace the troublesome K 12 V 230 DR engine with a less powerful, but more reliable design. After 2000, 9 more locomotives have been supplied to private freight operators in Italy. Four more have been delivered to a Czech private freight company. The reconstruction has not been very successful and no more locomotives have been modified in this way.

=== Class 755, 753.7 (Czech Rep.), 756 (ZSSK), D 753 (Italy) ===
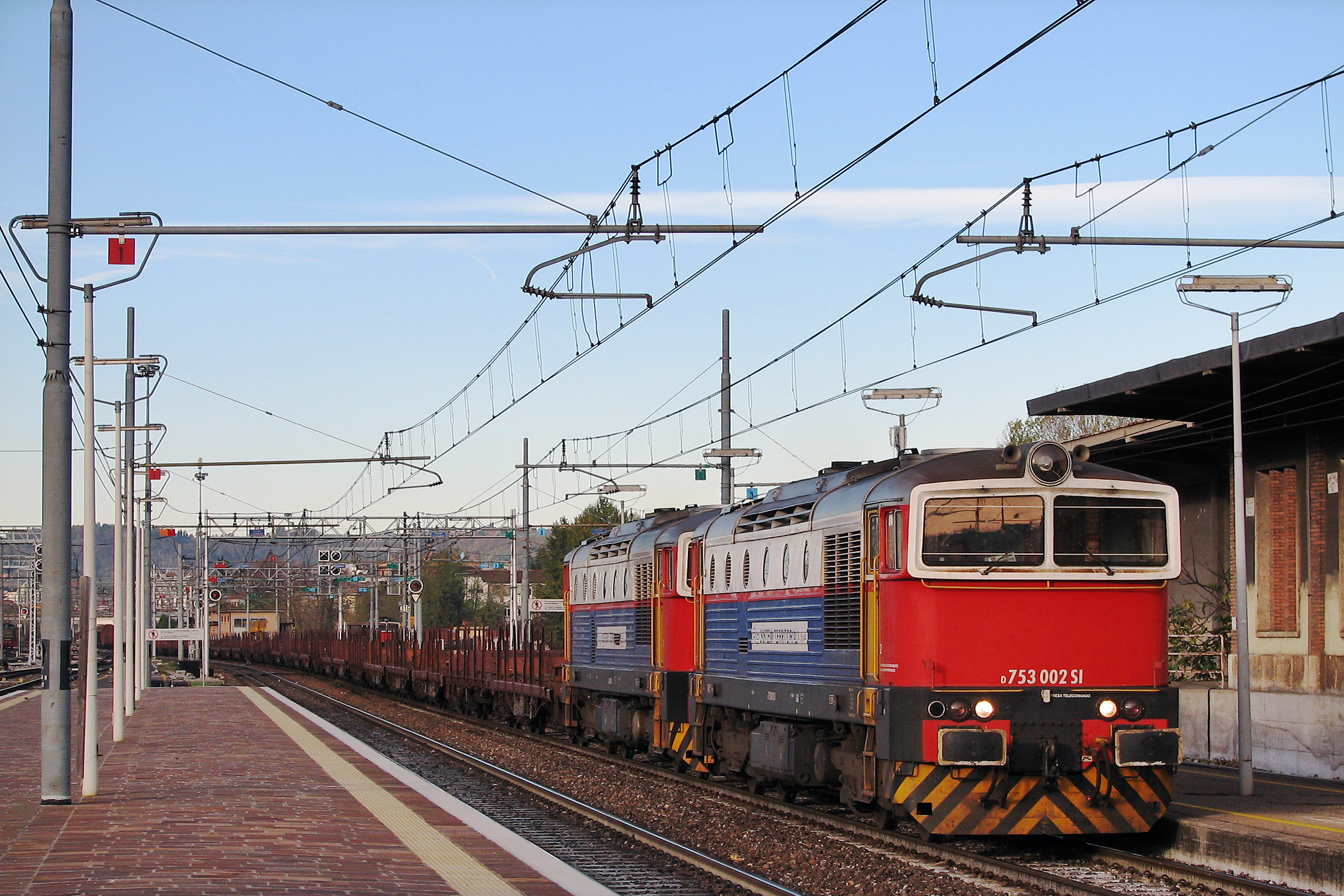
Class D 753 in Italy

Since 2001 until 2011, 106 locomotives of both the original 753 and 750 classes have been extensively rebuilt using a new Caterpillar 3512 B DI-TA engine and a new electronic control system. The first 31 pieces have been sold to private freight operators in Italy. More orders were placed by Czech freight operators, both private and state-owned. Ten locomotives have been reconstructed in the same way in Slovakia.

=== Class 750.7 (ČD), 757 (ZSSK) ===
Since 2010, reconstructions similar to the 753.7 class, but equipped with an electric train heating generator, have been done in the Czech Republic and Slovakia. 19 locomotives have been delivered to Czech Railways and 25 to Železničná spoločnosť Slovensko

=== Class 753.6 (Czech Republic) ===
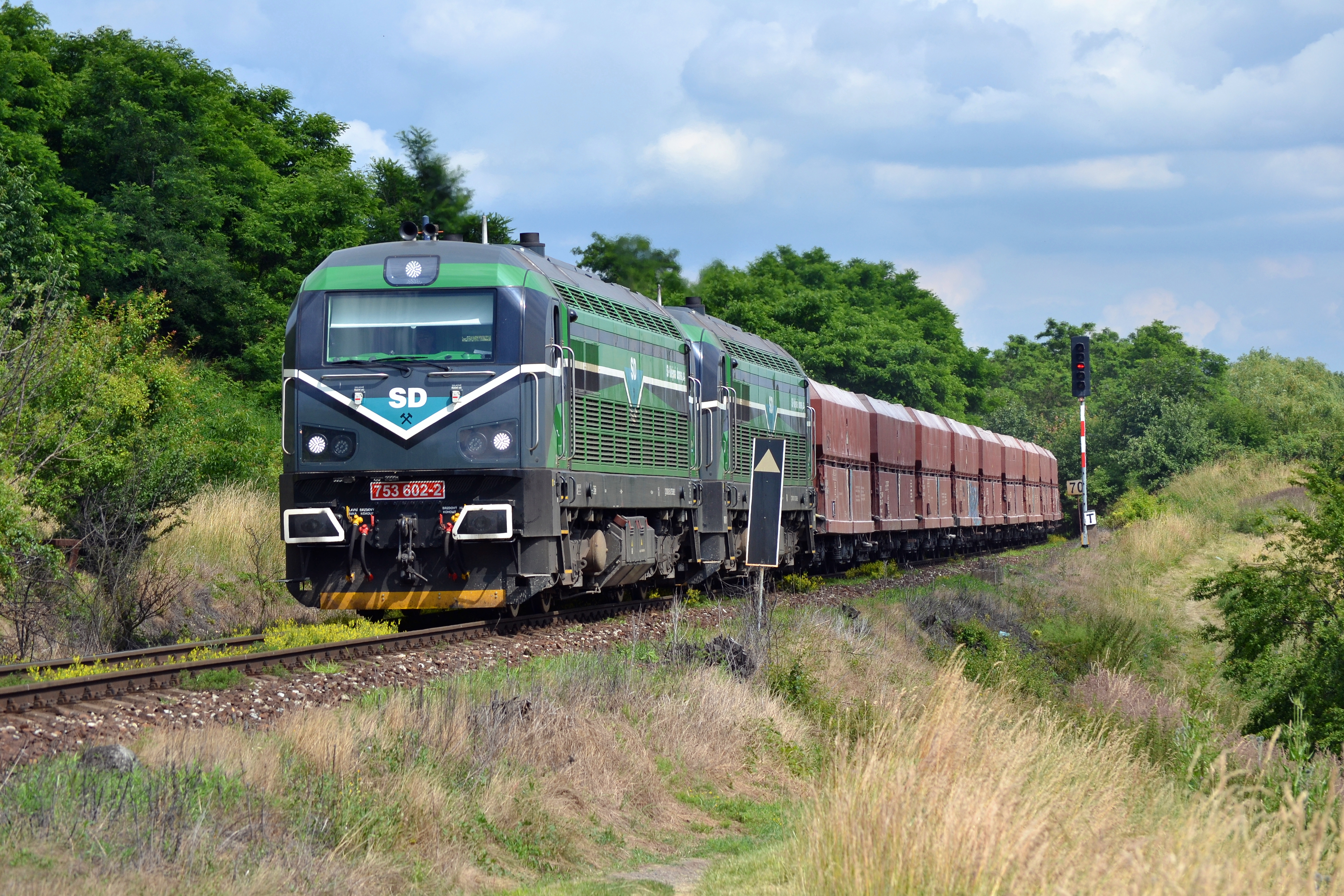
753.6 SD

Since 2012, a reconstruction similar to the Class 753.7, but with an entirely new locomotive body, has been carried out on 18 locomotives for numerous freight operators in the Czech Republic.
