= Ejpovice Tunnel =

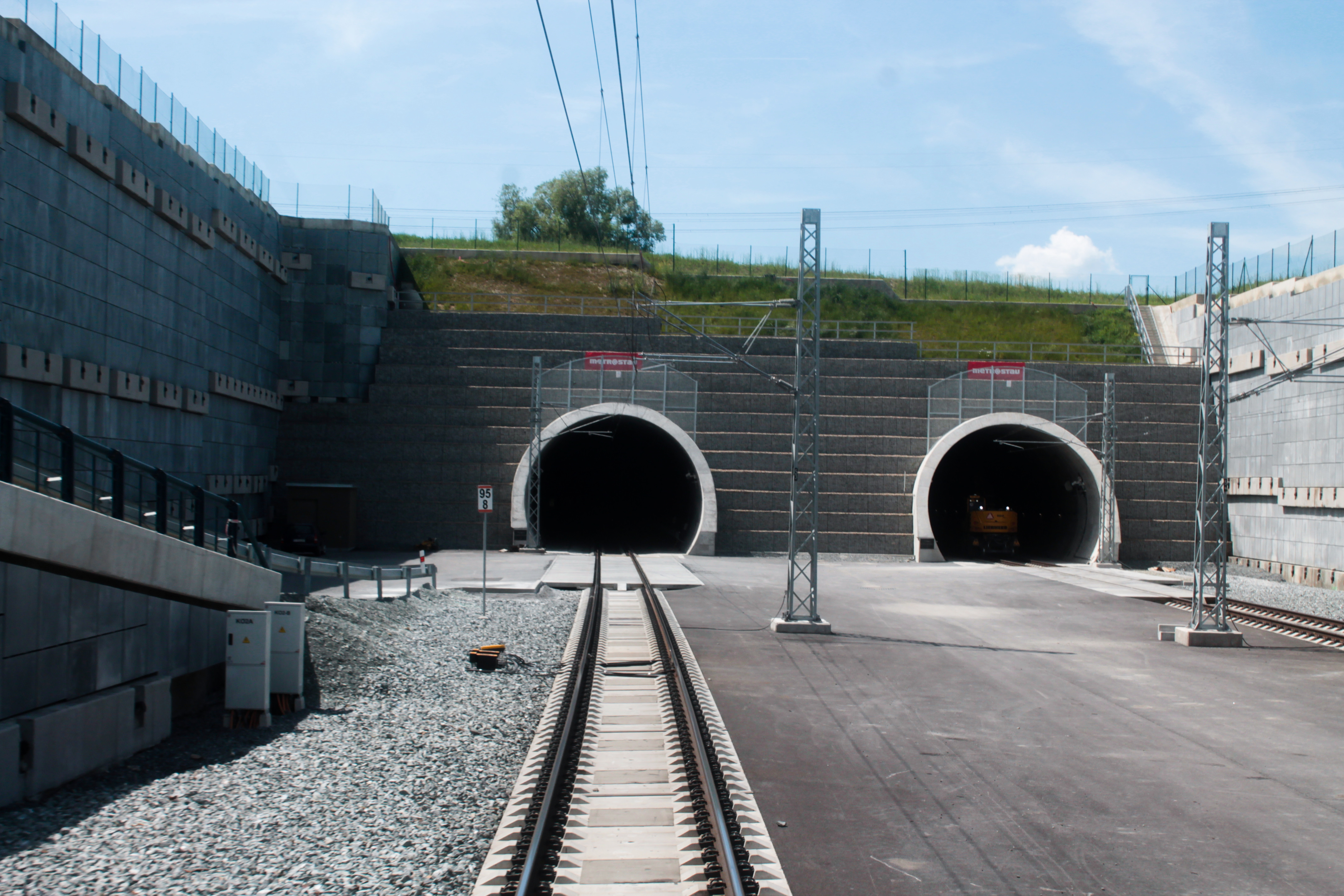
- Ejpovice railway tunnel
- Interactive map of Ejpovice Tunnel

Overview
- Official name: Czech: Ejpovický tunel
- Line: Prague–Plzeň
- Location: Ejpovice, Czech Republic
- Coordinates: 49.7633536°N 13.4713144°E
- Crosses: Chlum and Homolka hills near Ejpovice

Operation
- Opened: 15 November 2018
- Owner: Czech Republic
- Operator: Správa železnic
- Traffic: Railway
- Character: Passenger and freight

Technical
- Length: 4.150 km (2.579 mi)
- No. of tracks: 2 single-track tubes
- Track gauge: 1,435 mm (4 ft 8 1/2 in) (standard gauge)
- Electrified: 25 kV AC
- Operating speed: Maximum speed: 200 km/h (120 mph); Operational speed: 160 km/h (99 mph)

The Ejpovice Tunnel (Czech: Ejpovický tunel) is a two-tube railway tunnel in the Czech Republic. It is located on the Prague–Plzeň railway line at Ejpovice and therefore bears its name. Since its commissioning in 2018, it has been the longest railway tunnel in the country. It shortens the journey between the city of Plzeň and the town of Rokycany from 20 to 11 minutes. The tunnel is designed for 200 km/h (120 mph), but the maximum speed is currently limited to 160 km/h (99 mph). The tunnel will remain the longest in the country until the planned Ore Mountains Base Tunnel between the Czech Republic and Germany surpasses it.

When building the two tubes, a tunnel boring machine from the manufacturer Herrenknecht was used, with which up to 182 meters were driven per week. The equivalent of 260 million euros was invested in the construction.
