= Kubova Huť =

- Municipality
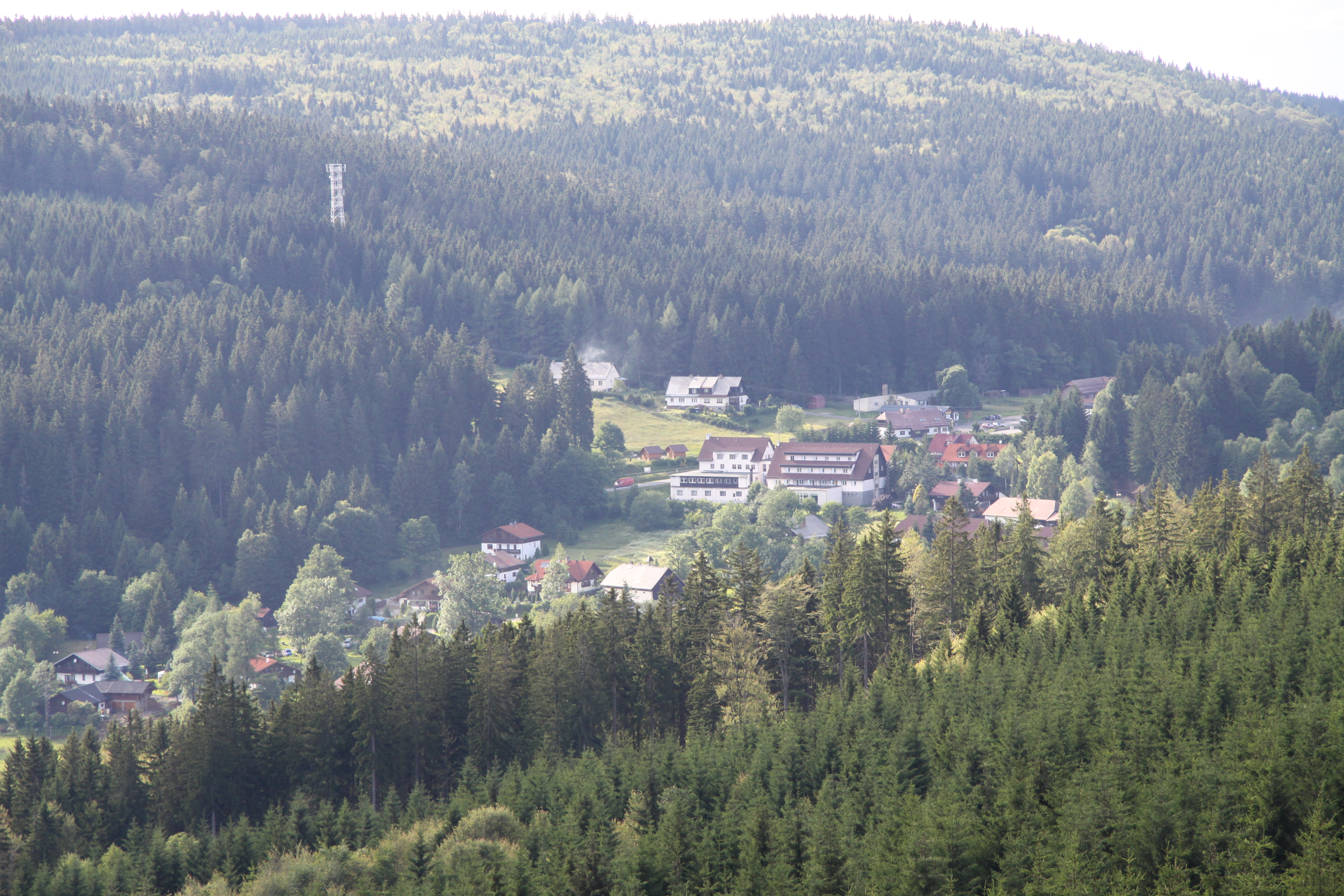
- General view

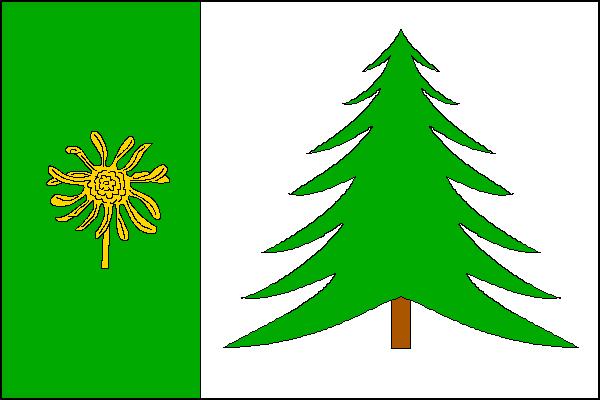
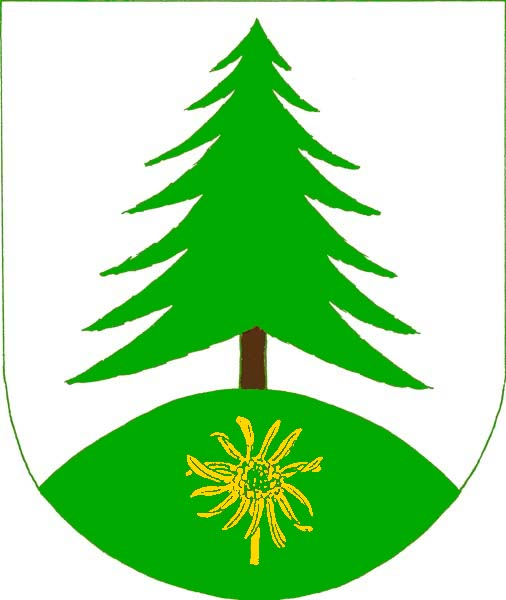
- Flag Coat of arms

- Location in the Czech Republic
- Coordinates: 48°59′0″N 13°46′19″E
- Country: Czech Republic
- Region: South Bohemian
- District: Prachatice
- First mentioned: 1728

Area
  - Total: 1.41 km^{2} (0.54 sq mi)
- Elevation: 960 m (3,150 ft)

Population (2026-01-01)
  - Total: 92
  - Density: 65/km^{2} (170/sq mi)
- Time zone: UTC+1 (CET)
  - Summer (DST): UTC+2 (CEST)
- Postal code: 385 01
- Website: www.sumavanet.cz/kubovahut/

Kubova Huť (German: Kubohütten) is a municipality and village in Prachatice District in the South Bohemian Region of the Czech Republic. It has about 90 inhabitants. Located in the Bohemian Forest mountain range, the municipality is known for the highest railway station in the country.

== Etymology ==
The name means "Kuba's smelter" in Czech. It was derived from the Guba's Forest (which was named after the local castle governor) and from the glassmaking in the area.

== Geography ==
Kubova Huť is located about 17 kilometres (11 mi) west of Prachatice and 50 km (31 mi) west of České Budějovice. It lies in the Bohemian Forest and in the Šumava Protected Landscape Area. The highest point is at 1,054 m (3,458 ft) above sea level.

== History ==
The first written mention of Kubova Huť is from 1728. Originally, the village was a settlement of glassmakers.

== Demographics ==
Historical population

Year	Pop.	±%
1869	153	—
1880	129	−15.7%
1890	137	+6.2%
1900	140	+2.2%
1910	141	+0.7%

Year	Pop.	±%
1921	135	−4.3%
1930	151	+11.9%
1950	55	−63.6%
1961	56	+1.8%
1970	56	+0.0%

Year	Pop.	±%
1980	64	+14.3%
1991	67	+4.7%
2001	114	+70.1%
2011	89	−21.9%
2021	78	−12.4%

Source: Censuses

== Transport ==
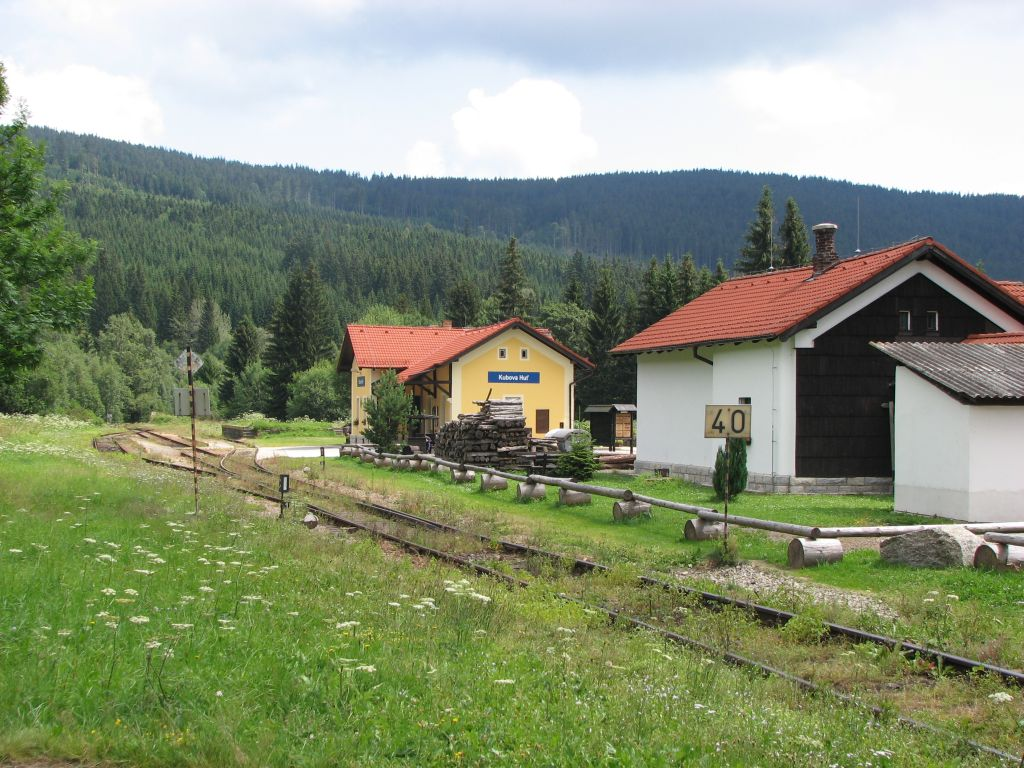
Railway station

Kubova Huť is located on the railway line Volary–Strakonice. Its railway station is the highest in the country at 995 m (3,264 ft) above sea level.

== Sights ==
There are no protected cultural monuments in the municipality.
