= Jizerka (Kořenov) =

Village in Liberec, Czechia

Coordinates: 50°49′07″N 15°20′44″E

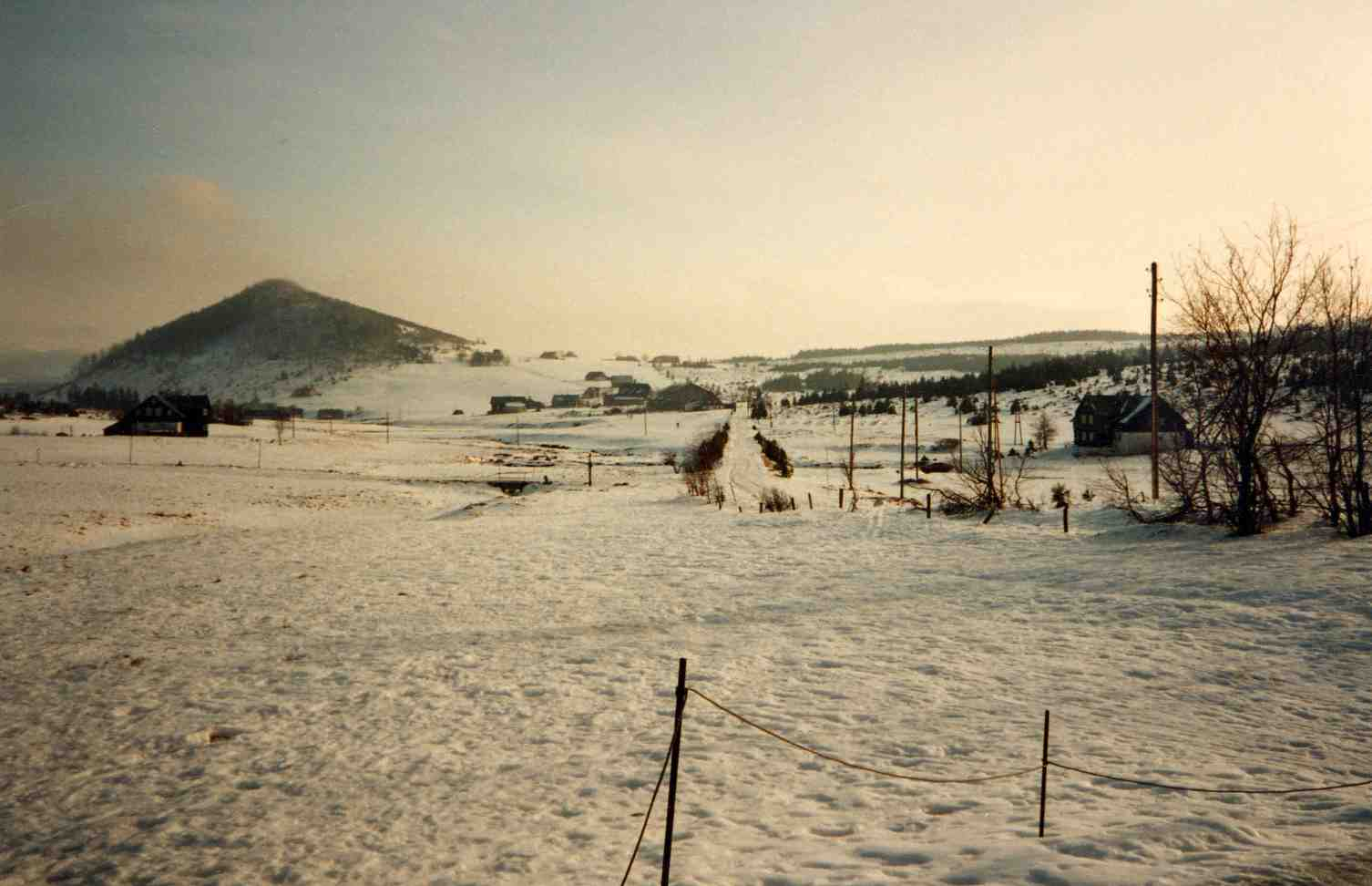
Jizerka with the Bukovec Hill

Jizerka from Kořenov road (August 2009)

Jizerka (German: Klein Iser) is part of municipality Kořenov in Jablonec nad Nisou District. The hamlet located in the Bohemian part of Jizera Mountains, on the border with Silesia, Poland.

In the 15th century first inhabitants settled in the area to look for gemstones. The oldest written reference is from 16th century. The settlement was called Bukowec. At the end of the 18th century there were 7 buildings and the inhabitants made a living from forestry and smuggling. In 1829 glassworks were opened. At the peak of the glass industry Jizerka had a population of approximately 450 people. There was a school, pub, sawmill, bakery, blacksmith and other craftsmen. In 1911 the wood-fired glassworks were closed. Coal-fired factories located in the valleys were more efficient. At the same time, tourism began to take off. Some houses became hostels, others pubs. After World War II most of the buildings were nationalised. In the 1980s massive deforestation took place. In the 1990s the buildings were privatised and Jizerka became a recreation centre again.
