= Ladislav Rygl Sr. =

Czech Nordic combined skier (1947–2024)

Ladislav Rygl
Personal information
- Born: 16 July 1947 Polubný, Kořenov, Czechoslovakia
- Died: 30 November 2024 (aged 77)
- Height: 1.81 m (5 ft 11 in)

Sport
- Sport: Skiing
- Club: Slavia Prague

World Cup career
- Seasons: 1967 – 1972
Medal record
Men's Nordic combined
Representing Czechoslovakia
World Championships
Gold medal – first place	1970 Vysoké Tatry	Individual

Ladislav Rygl Sr. (16 July 1947 – 30 November 2024) was a Czechoslovak Nordic combined skier who competed in the late 1960s and early 1970s. He won a gold medal in the individual event at the 1970 FIS Nordic World Ski Championships in Vysoké Tatry. He also competed at the 1968 Winter Olympics and the 1972 Winter Olympics.

Rygl died on 30 November 2024, at the age of 77. His son, Ladislav Jr., competed in Nordic combined from 1995 to 2006.
