= Dolní Loučky =

- Municipality
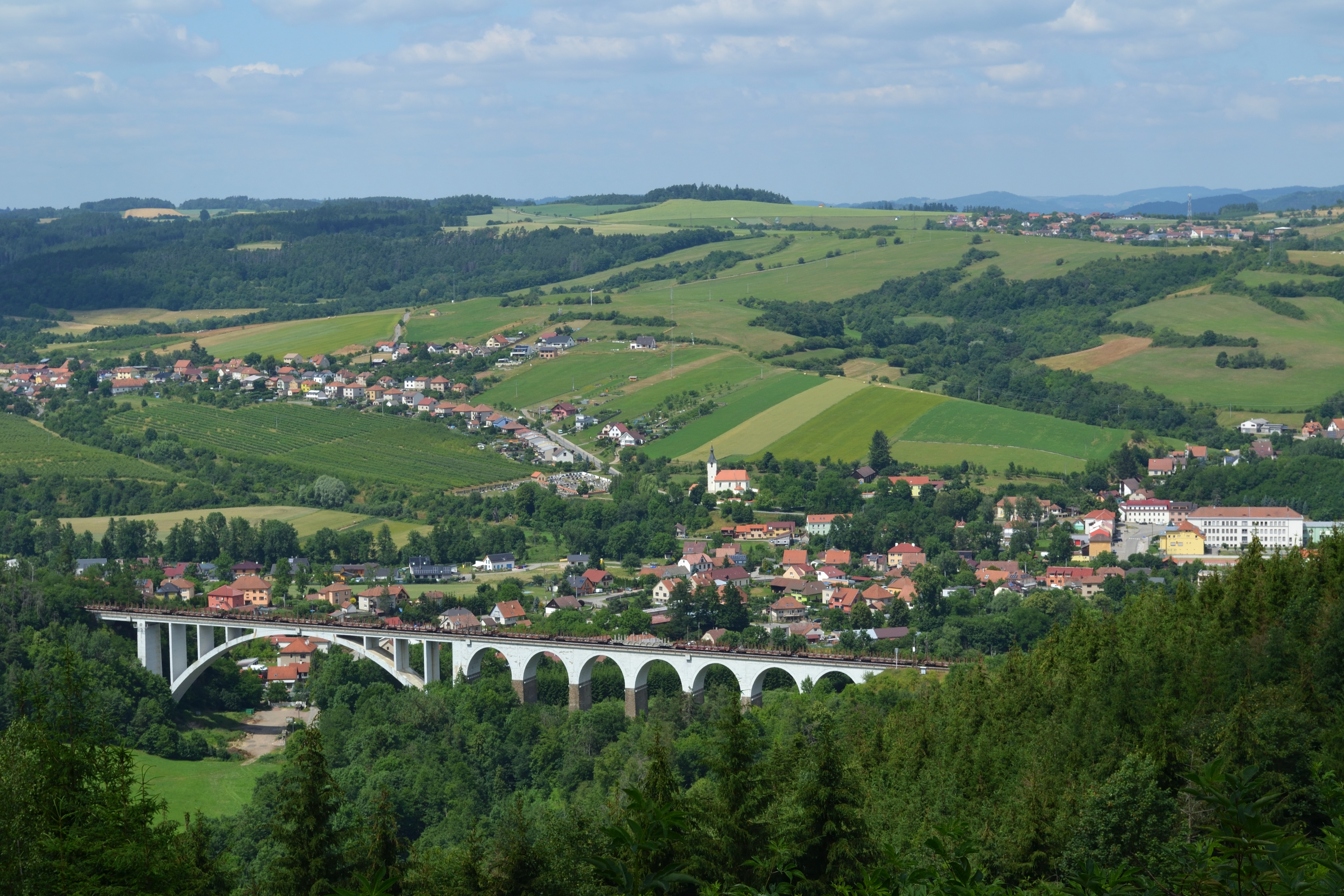
- View from the south

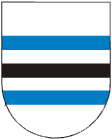
- Flag Coat of arms

- Location in the Czech Republic
- Coordinates: 49°11′30″N 16°46′17″E
- Country: Czech Republic
- Region: South Moravian
- District: Brno-Country
- First mentioned: 1236

Area
  - Total: 8.14 km^{2} (3.14 sq mi)
- Elevation: 283 m (928 ft)

Population (2026-01-01)
  - Total: 1,301
  - Density: 160/km^{2} (414/sq mi)
- Time zone: UTC+1 (CET)
  - Summer (DST): UTC+2 (CEST)
- Postal code: 594 55
- Website: www.dolniloucky.cz

Dolní Loučky is a municipality and village in Brno-Country District in the South Moravian Region of the Czech Republic. It has about 1,300 inhabitants.

Dolní Loučky lies approximately 26 kilometres (16 mi) north-west of Brno and 162 km (101 mi) south-east of Prague.

== Administrative division ==
Dolní Loučky consists of two municipal parts (in brackets population according to the 2021 census):

- Dolní Loučky (1,103)
- Střemchoví (173)

== Demographics ==
Historical population
Year	Pop.	±%
1869	782	—
1880	841	+7.5%
1890	866	+3.0%
1900	882	+1.8%
1910	861	−2.4%
1921	845	−1.9%
1930	926	+9.6%
1950	1,092	+17.9%
1961	984	−9.9%
1970	1,011	+2.7%
1980	1,087	+7.5%
1991	1,056	−2.9%
2001	1,102	+4.4%
2011	1,204	+9.3%
2021	1,276	+6.0%
Source: Censuses

== Notable people ==
- Antonín Mrkos (1918–1996), astronomer

== Sights ==
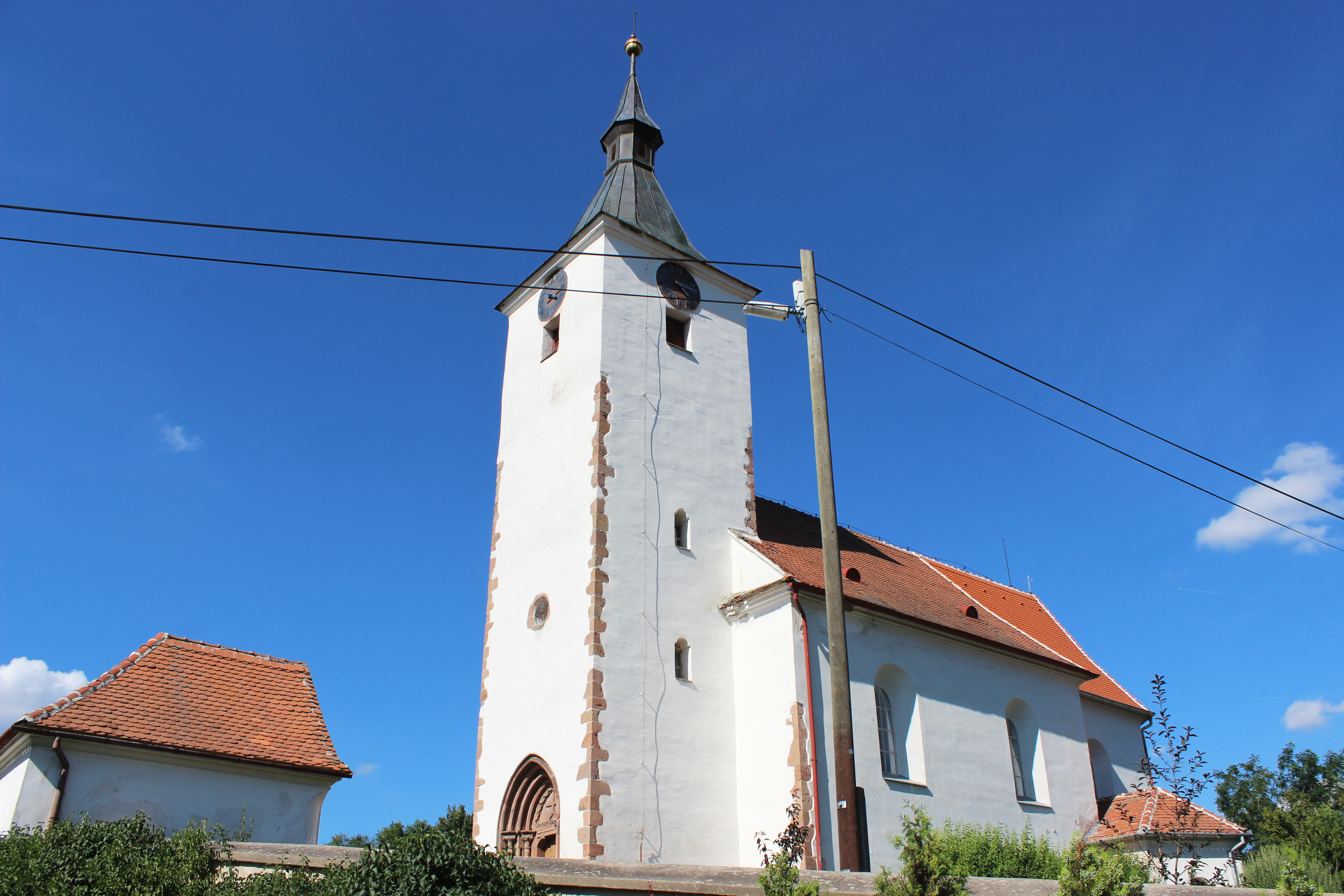
Church of Saint Martin

The main landmark of Dolní Loučky is the Church of Saint Martin. It is a Gothic building.
