= ČSD Class T 499.0 =

Czech prototype diesel locomotive class

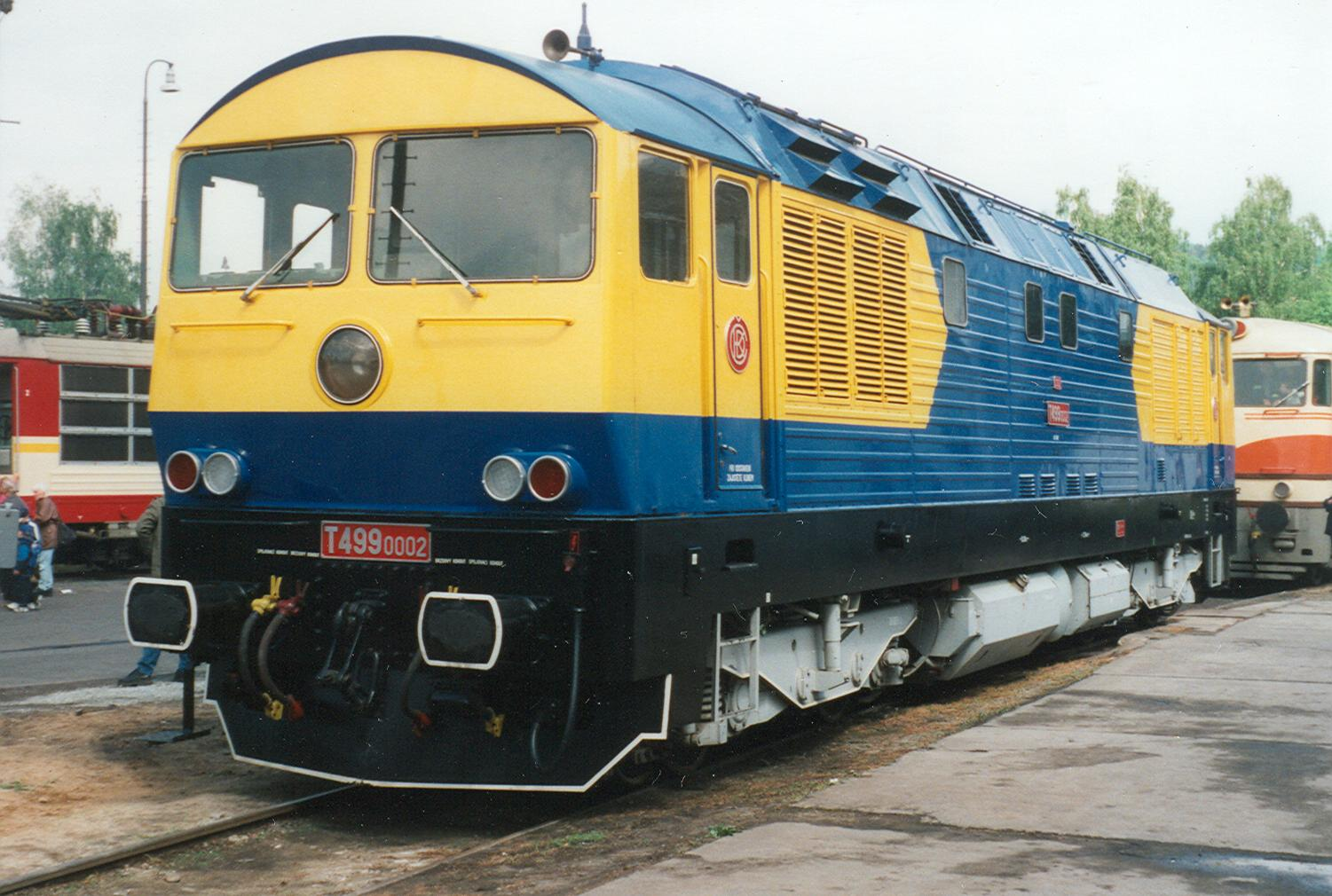
Type and origin
- Power type: Diesel Electric
- Builder: ČKD
- Build date: 1974 to 1975
- Total produced: 2
- Rebuilder: DPOV, a.s.
- Rebuild date: 2012-2014
- Number rebuilt: 1
Specifications
- Configuration
  - AAR: B-B
  - UIC: Bo'Bo'
  - Commonwealth: Bo-Bo
- Gauge: 1,435 mm (4 ft 8 1/2 in)
- Length: 17.84 metres (58.5 ft)
- Width: 3.090 metres (10.14 ft)
- Height: 4.646 metres (15.24 ft)
- Loco weight: 85 metric tons (84 long tons; 94 short tons)
- Fuel capacity: 4,000 liters (880 imp gal; 1,100 U.S. gal)
- Prime mover: ČKD K 12 V 230 DR
Performance figures
- Maximum speed: 140 kilometres per hour (87 mph)
- Power output: 1,760 kilowatts (2,360 hp)
Career
- Operators: ČSD, ČD, VÚŽ
- Nicknames: Cyclops
- Current owner: Výzkumný Ústav Železniční
- Disposition: 1 in use, 1 scrapped

The ČSD Class T 499.0 (ČD Class 759 since 1987) is a Czech diesel electric locomotive originally designed for express passenger use on unelectrified lines. Two locomotives were built by ČKD as prototypes, with the locomotive never entering mass production, due to the locomotive's high weight, and progress in electrifying main lines.

== History ==
The locomotives were initially developed due to the requirement in the late 1960s for powerful diesel locomotives to be used on express services. 2 prototypes were built between 1974 and 1975 by ČKD Praha, who leased the locomotives to ČSD.

The locomotives were initially tested between Prague and Ostrava, working the express train Ostravan. Although the locomotive could keep to the timings of the ČSD Class E 499.1 locomotives, the locomotives suffered from reliability problems. In 1976 the second locomotive was returned to the manufacturer, due to frequent unavailability. In January 1977, both locomotives were moved to Děčín, and used on freight services between Děčín and Prague.

The first locomotive was withdrawn in November 1979, following an engine room fire, with the second following in March 1980 due to an engine fault. The two where then purchased by VÚŽ (Výzkumný Ústav Železniční), the Czech Railway Research Institute, and moved to the Velim test circuit. The first locomotive was used as a spare parts source for the second, and was eventually used for crash tests, then scrapped. In 1992, locomotive two was withdrawn after an engine room fire.

== Later use ==
In December 2012, the second locomotive was moved to DPOV's Nymburk works for a return to operation, with adaptations being made to overcome the initial reliability problems, including the fitting of an entirely new electrical control system. This overhaul was completed in late 2014, with locomotive testing beginning in 2015, and moving to its new home at the Velim test circuit in February 2015.

Since 2015, the locomotive has been used by VÚŽ, for testing work.

== See also ==
List of České dráhy locomotive classes
