= Cheb–Hranice v Čechách railway =

Railway in the Czech Republic

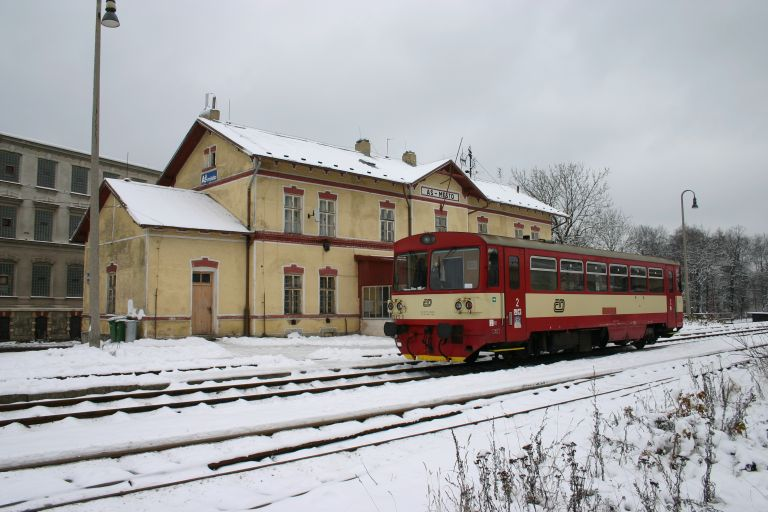
- ČD Class 810 rail motor coach at Aš station in 2005

Overview
- Line number: 148
- Locale: Czech Republic

Service
- Operator(s): Czech Railways

History
- Opened: 1865

Technical
- Track length: 44 km (27 mi)
- Track gauge: 1,435 mm (4 ft 8 1/2 in) standard gauge
- Electrification: Cheb - Fr. Lázně: 25 kV 50 Hz AC AC (the rest is not electrified)
Route map
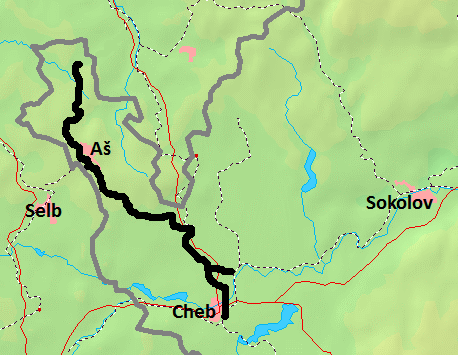

Cheb–Hranice v Čechách railway is the number 148 railway of the Czech Republic, which is partially electrified at 25 kV 50 Hz AC. It is operated by Czech Railways and mainly Czech-made ČD Class 814 and ČD Class 810 locomotives are on the line.

== History ==
=== Between Cheb and Aš ===
The section between Cheb and Aš was built and opened on 1 November 1865 by Bavarian Railways. Railway station of Cheb was opened in the same year, but was destroyed by heavy bombing at the end of World War II. An interim one was built, which was replaced by the current one in 1962.

=== Between Aš and Hranice v Čechách ===
The section from Asch (Aš) to Roßbach (Hranice v Čechách) was built from 1884 to 1885. It was opened on 26 September 1885 and contributed to the improvement of Hranice's textile manufacturing. The station at Asch belonged to the Bavarian Railways, so locally it was called the Bavarian railway station. The town's second station was built by the Imperial Royal Privileged Austrian State Railway Company. Until 2002 there was also a third, suburban railway station in Aš, which today is only a single-platform halt with a metal shelter. The Bavarian station was demolished in 1968 and replaced by a new one in 1969. It is the main railway station of the town. Aš-město (the town's second station) was renovated in 2008.

== Route ==
The railway starts from the main railway station at Cheb and runs through Františkovy Lázně Aquaforum, Františkovy Lázně, Vojtanov and Hazlov before arriving at Aš, where there are Aš – hlavní nádraží (Aš railway station), and Aš-město (Aš town) stations.

In the 1980s all trains from Cheb went as far as Hranice v Čechách; during the following decade there were fewer connections between Aš-město and Hranice v Čechách. In 2008 there was only one pair of trains on this part of the line.

== Stations and stops on the line ==
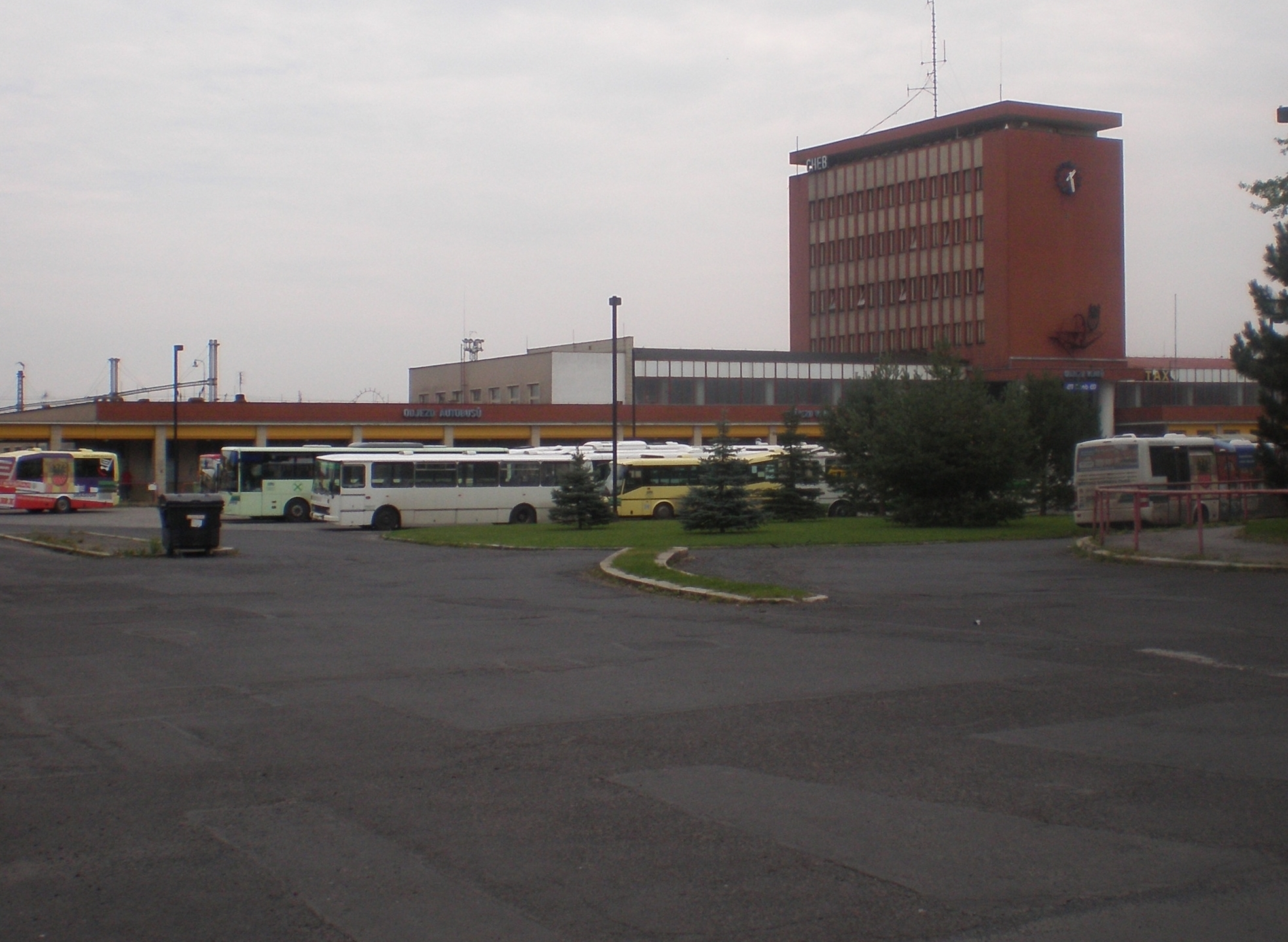
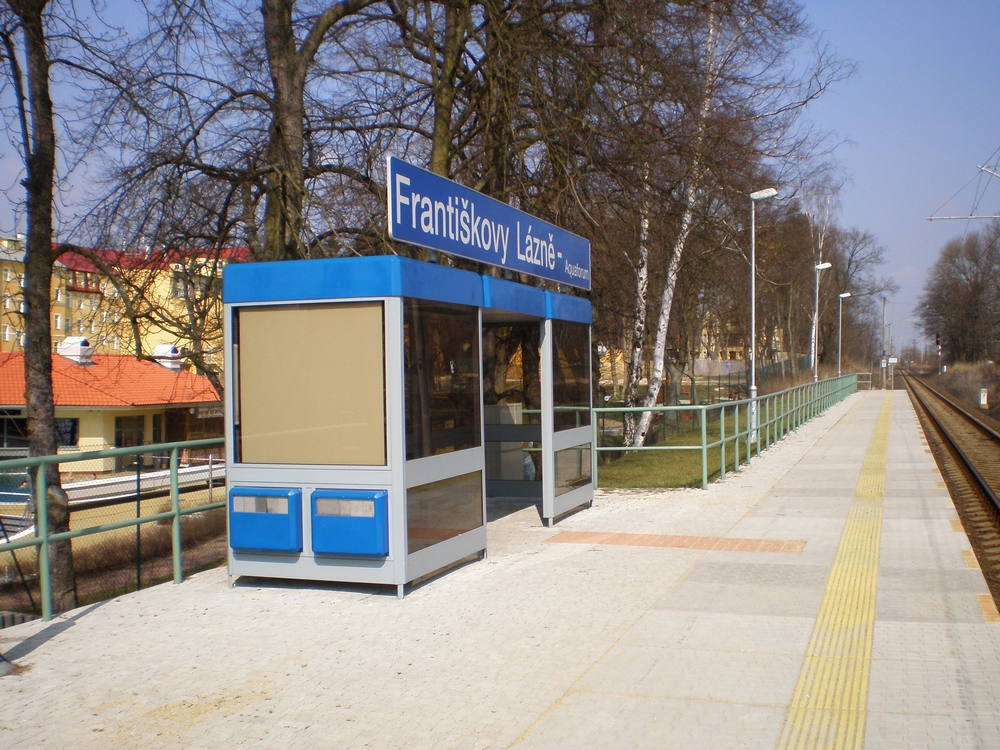
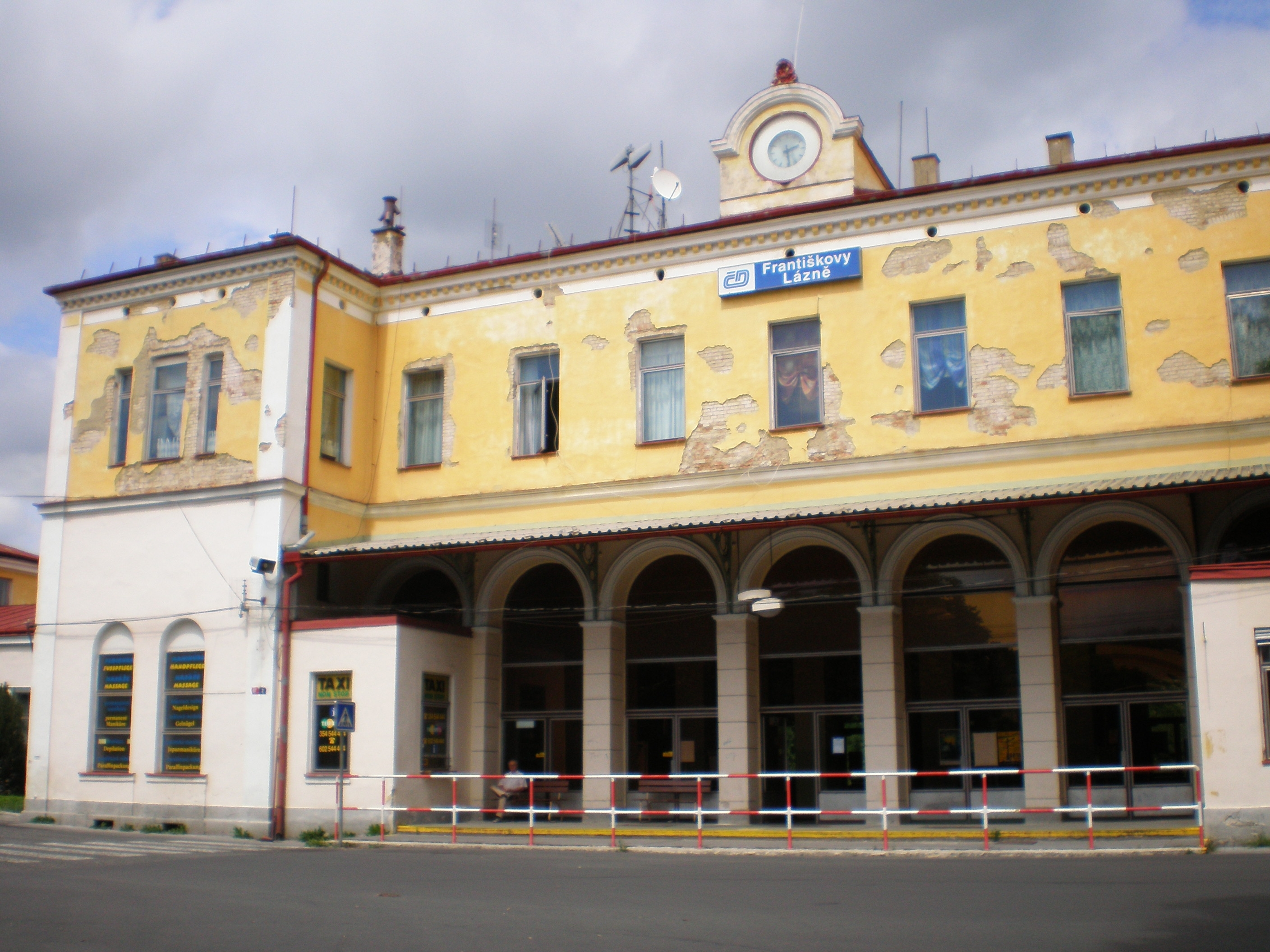
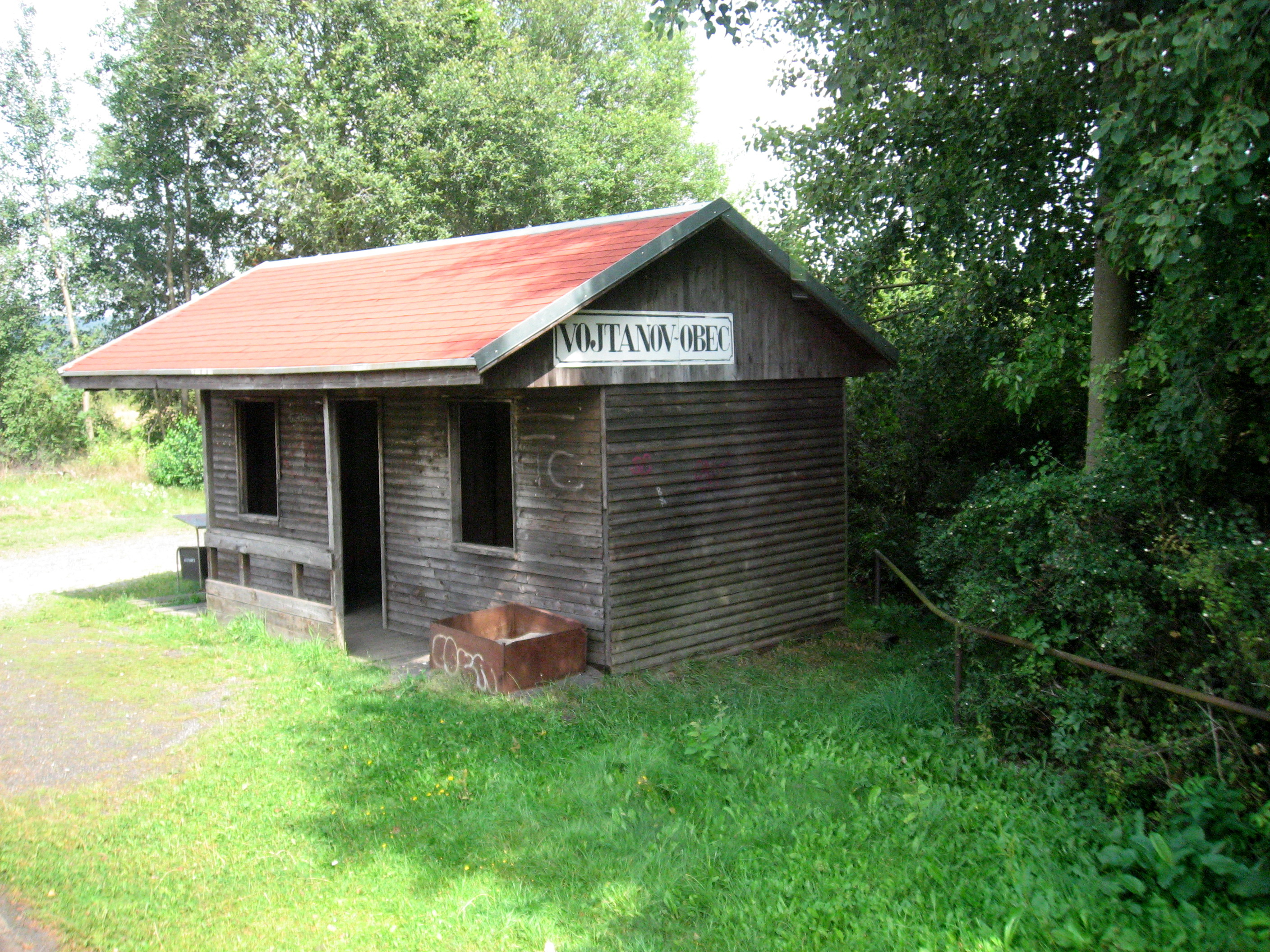
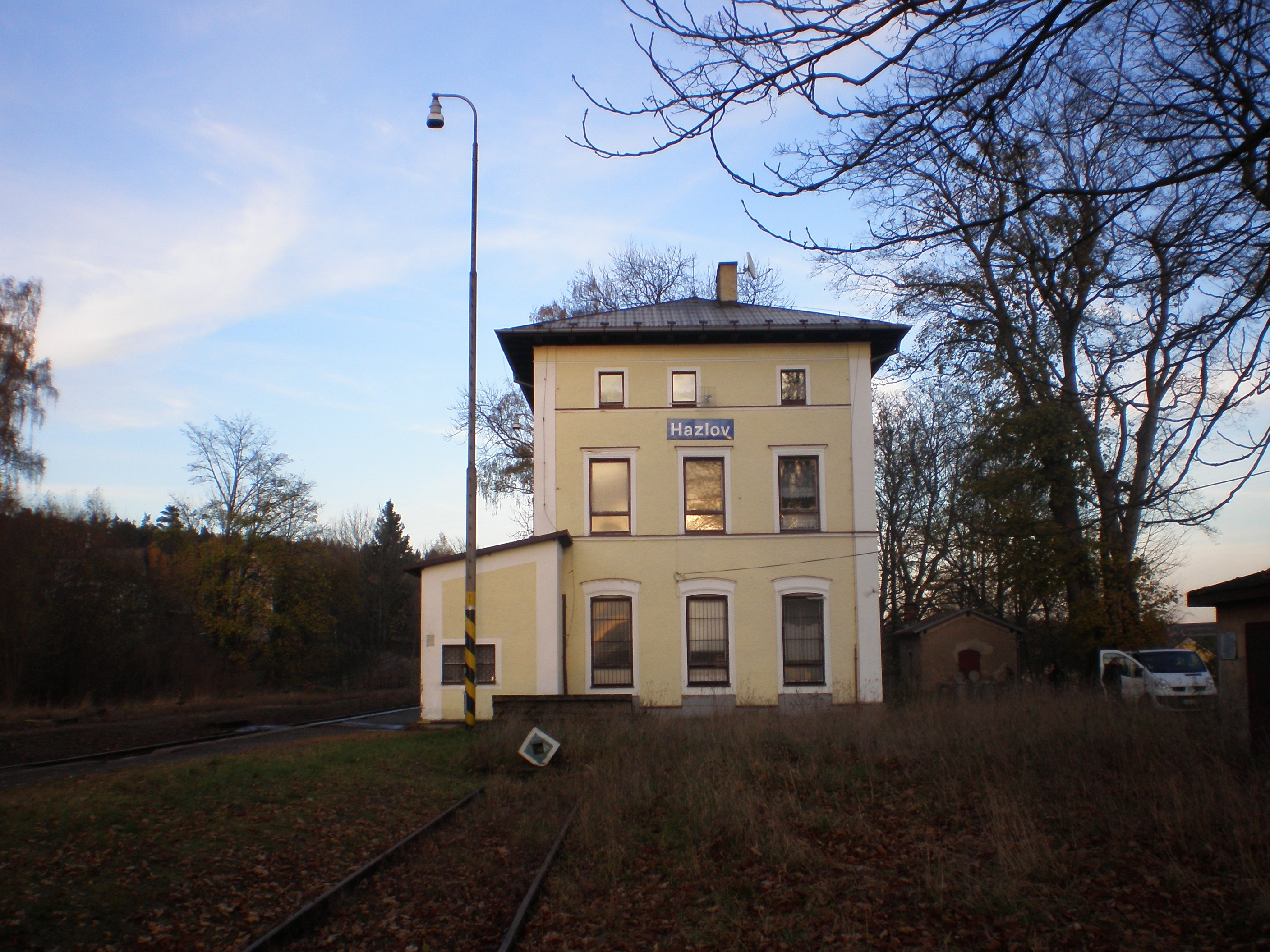
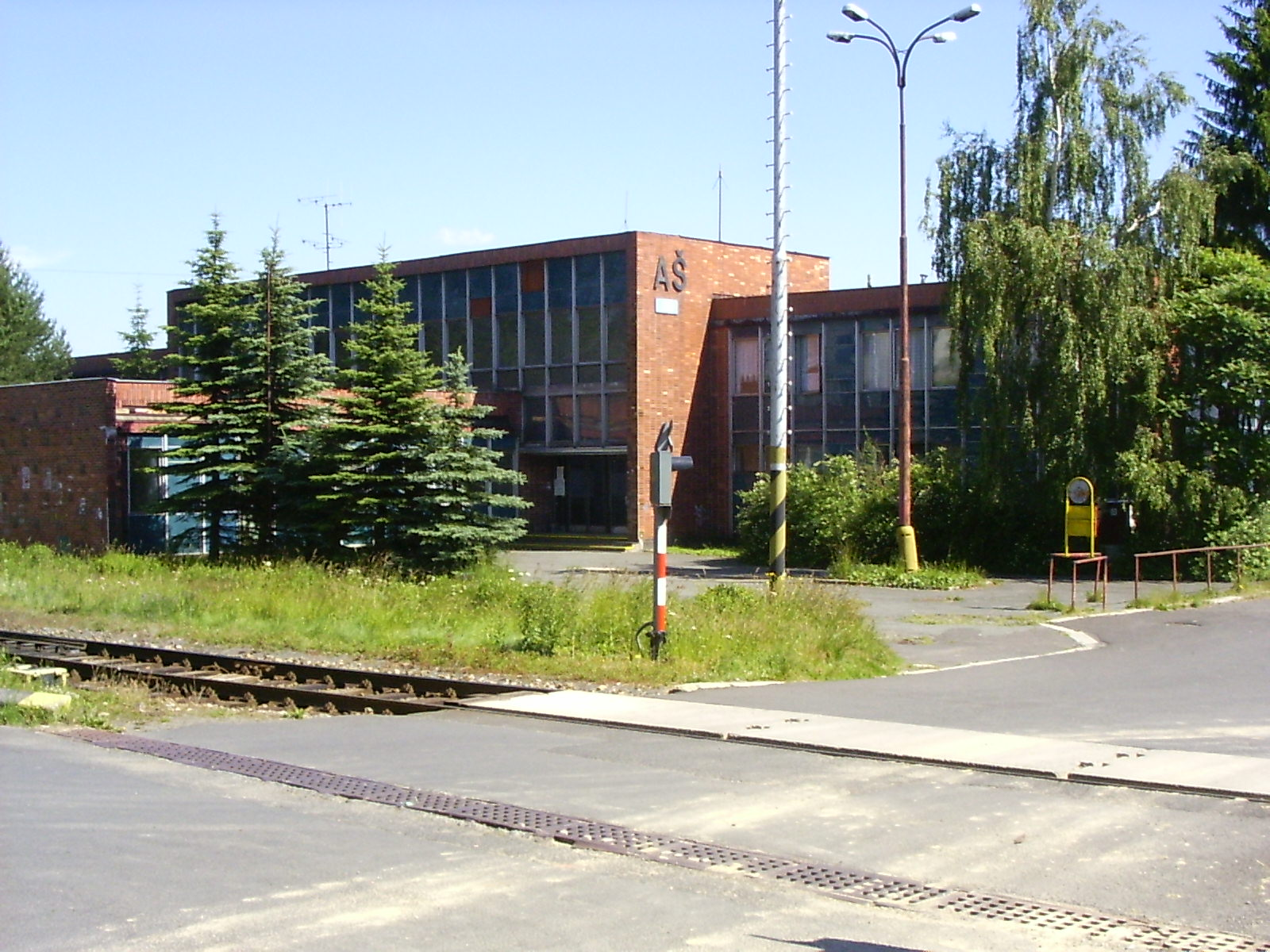
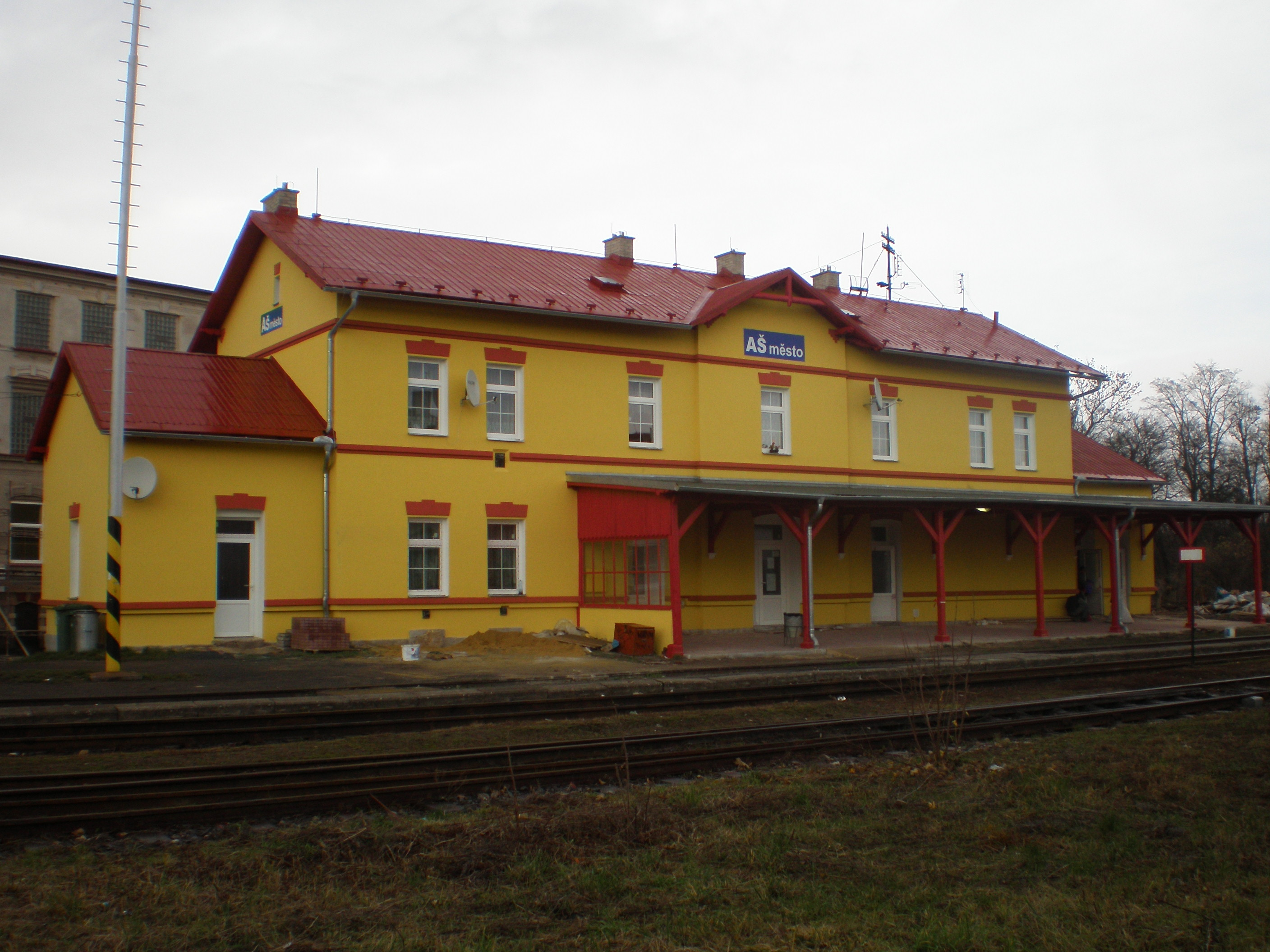
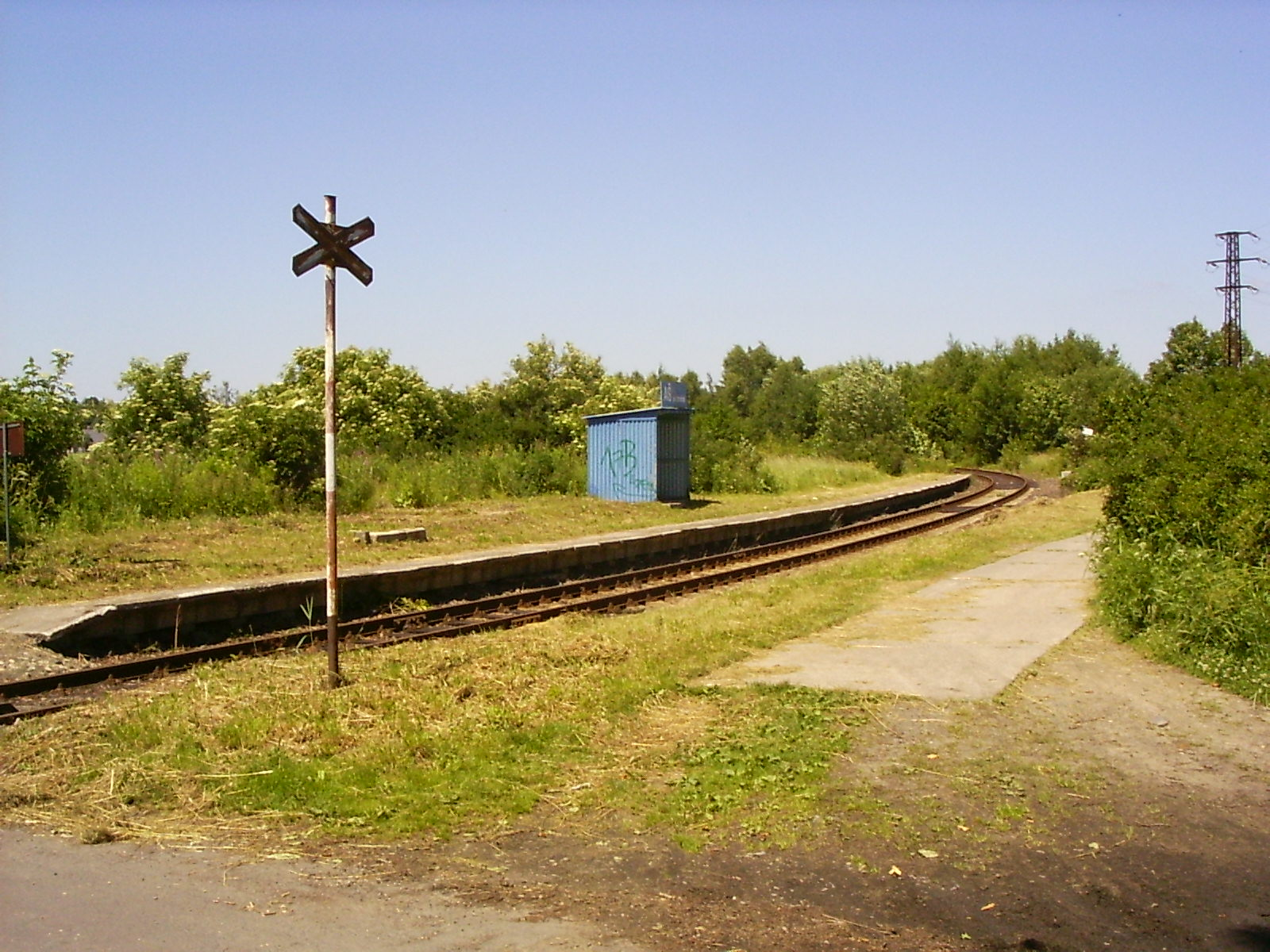
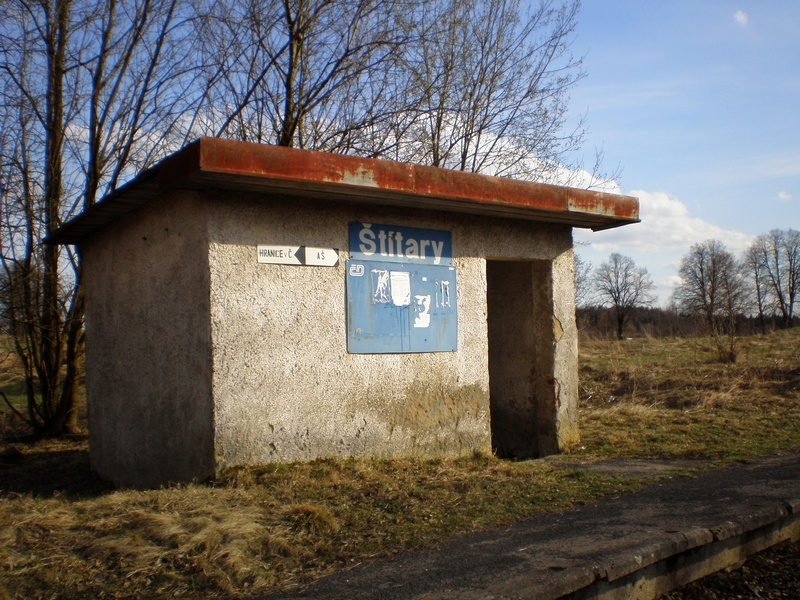
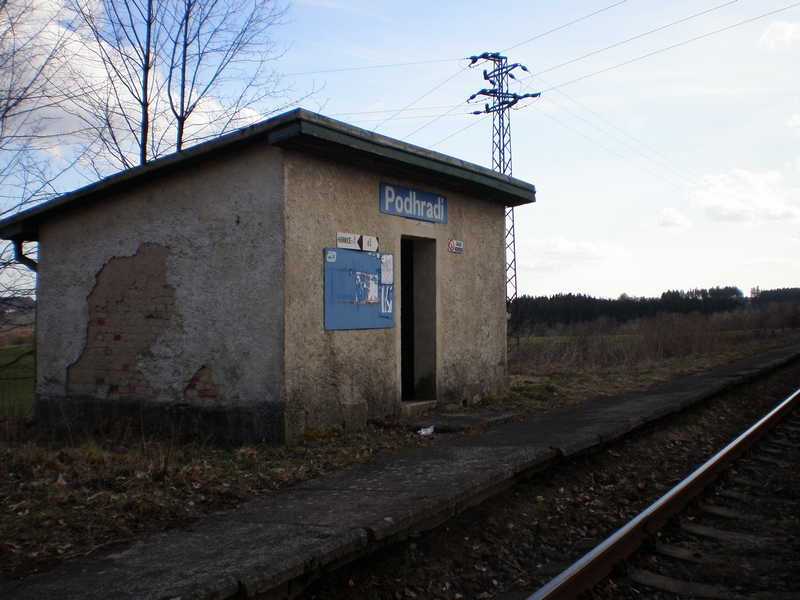
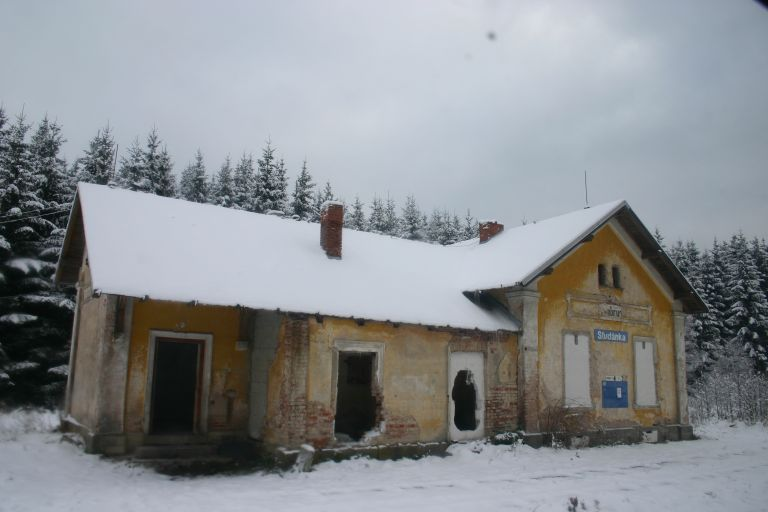
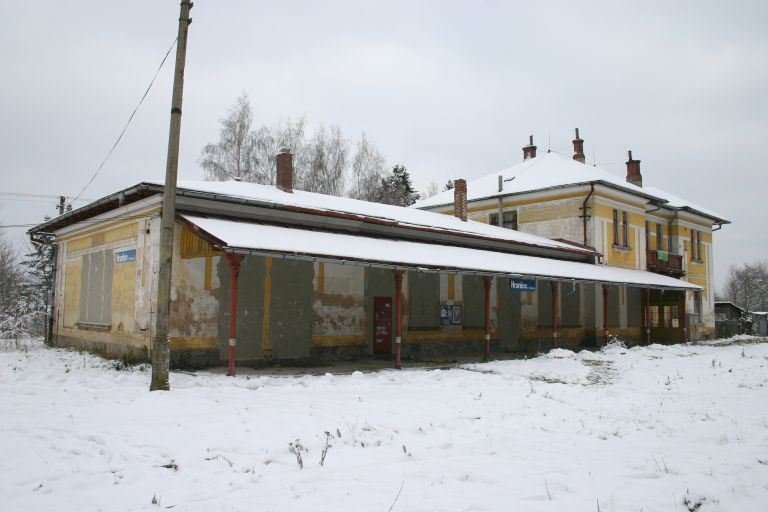
km	Station	Description	Image
0	Cheb	Railway station
6	Františkovy Lázně-Aquaforum	newly built stop
7	Františkovy Lázně	railway station
16	Vojtanov obec	stop (made of wood)
19	Hazlov	closed railway station
28	Aš	railway station
30	Aš město	railway station renovated in 2008.
32	Aš předměstí	stop
35	Štítary	stop
37	Podhradí	stop
40	Studánka	railway station with closed building
44	Hranice v Čechách	railway station with closed building
