= ČSD Class M 152.0 =

Czech diesel motor coach class

ČSD M 152.0 ČD/ŽSR Series 810
- Manufacturer: Vagonka Studénka
- Constructed: Prototype (M 151.0): 1973; Series: 1975–1984
- Number built: M 152.0: 687; M 152.5: 2
- Capacity: 55 seats; 40 standing room
- Operators: (Czechoslovakia) Czechoslovak State Railways; (Hungary) Hungarian State Railways; (Slovakia) Railways of the Slovak Republic

Specifications
- Train length: 13.97 m (45.8 ft)
- Height: 3.5 m (11 ft)
- Wheel diameter: 840 mm (33 in)
- Wheelbase: 8,000 mm (310 in)
- Maximum speed: 80 km/h (50 mph)
- Weight: 20.0 t (19.7 long tons; 22.0 short tons)
- Axle load: 10.0 t (9.8 long tons; 11.0 short tons)
- Traction system: 29 kN (6,500 lb_{f})
- Prime mover: Diesel engine
- Engine type: LIAZ ML 634
- Cylinder count: 6
- Power output: 154.9 kW (207.7 hp)
- Transmission: Hydromechanical
- AAR wheel arrangement: 1-A
- Track gauge: M 152.0 / 810.0: 1,435 mm (4 ft 8 1/2 in); M 152.5 / 810.8: 1,520 mm (4 ft 11 27/32 in)

The M 152.0 is the most common Czechoslovak diesel motor coach in the Czech Republic and Slovakia. It was designed, manufactured and used in the former Czechoslovakia and now used in the Czech Republic (ČD Class 810) and Slovakia (ZSSK Class 812). It was produced from 1975 to 1982 by Vagonka Studénka.

Both ČD and ZSSK refurbish 810s into newer units, sometimes with smaller repairs and additions that retain the class number, or large refurbishments such as ČD Class 814 or ZSSK Class 813, and have a second modernization since 2018, have been using a marketing name for those trainsets, RegioMouse.

MÁV also operates the type as MÁV Class 117 (formerly designated as "Bzmot"). These were rebuilt with new engines and transmission, and had other refurbishments.

== Gallery ==
Historic Czechoslovak diesel railcar M152.0486 (810 486-1)

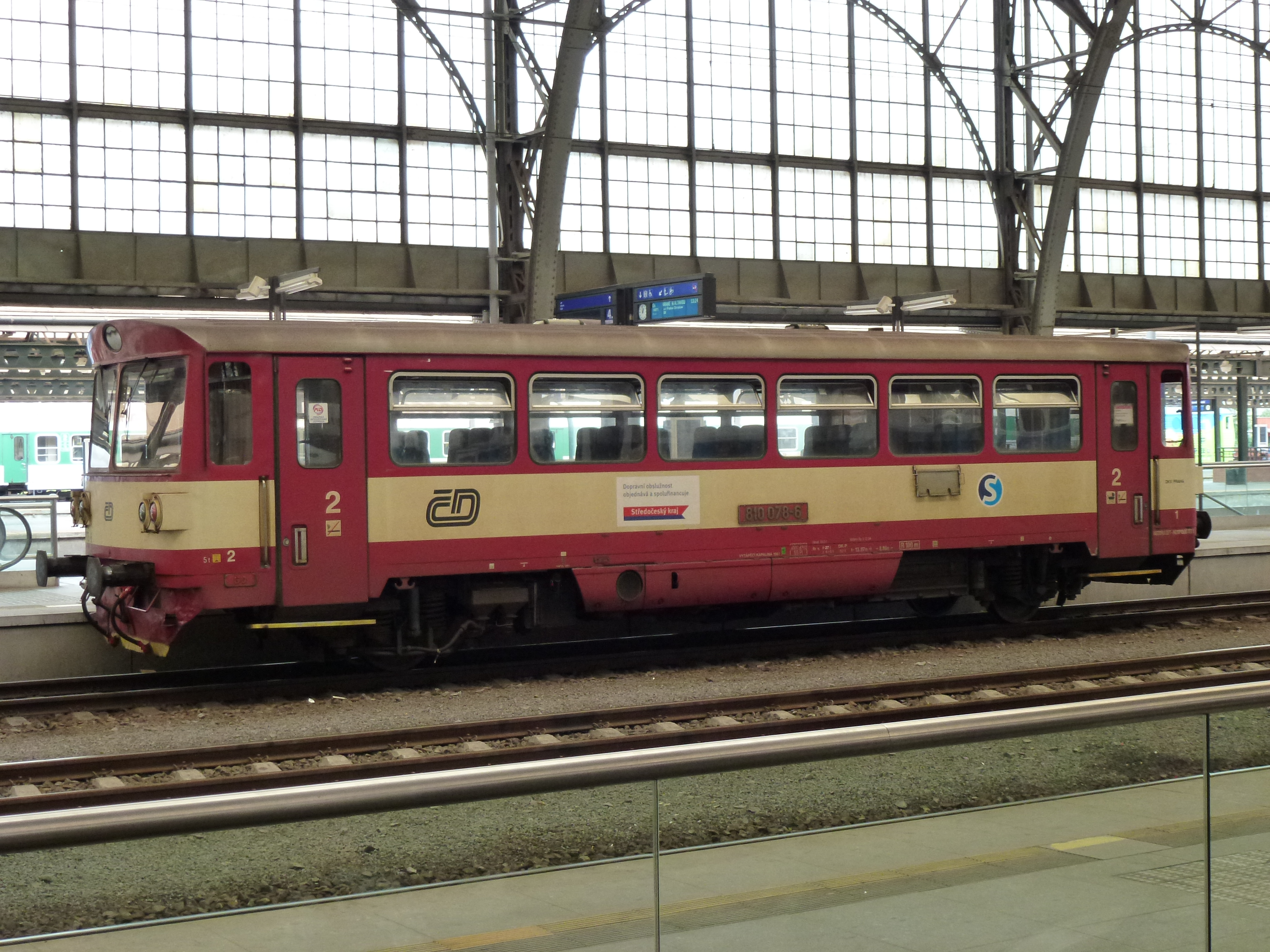
810 078–6 in Prague

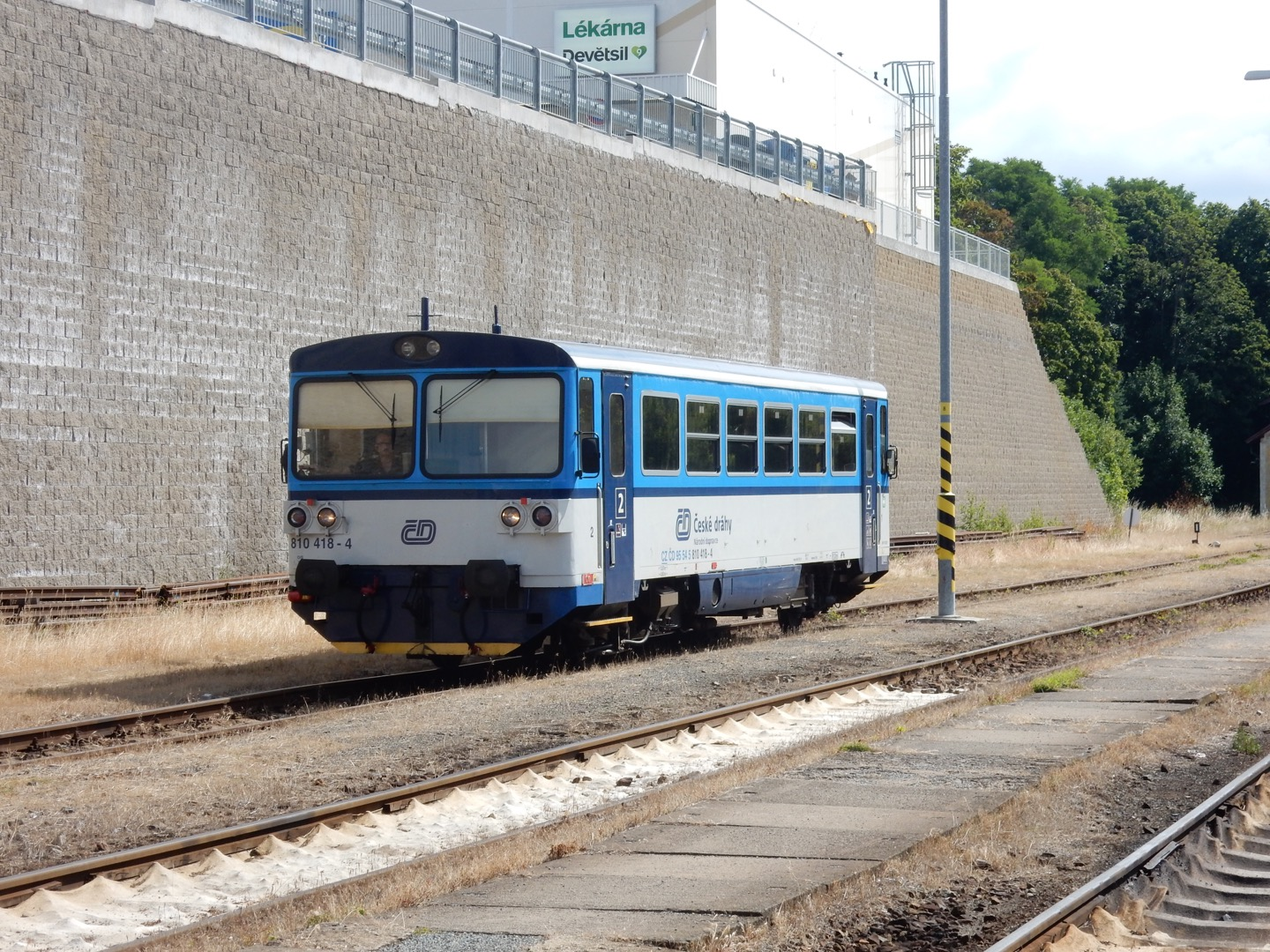
810 418 in Tachov

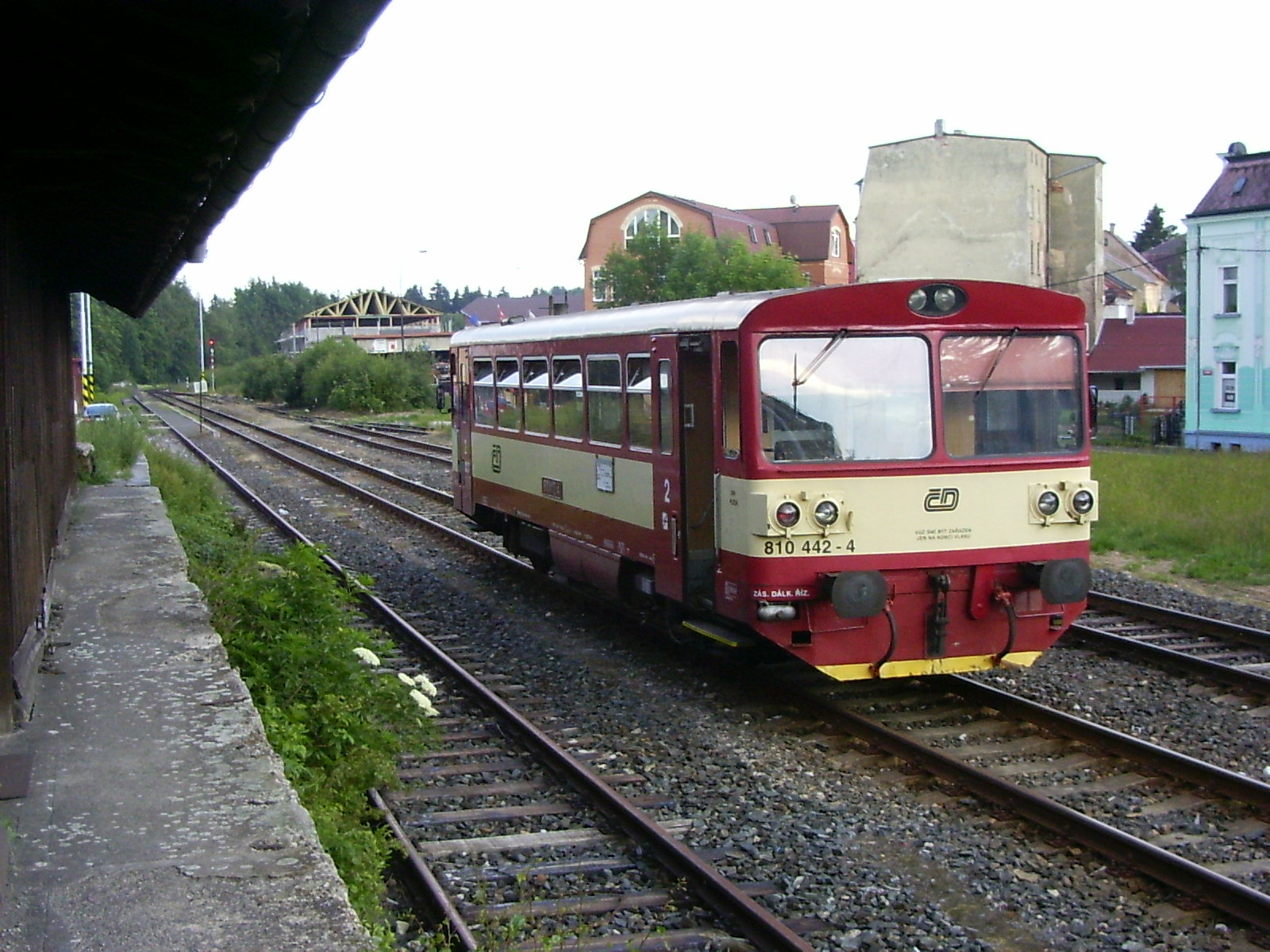
810 442 in Aš

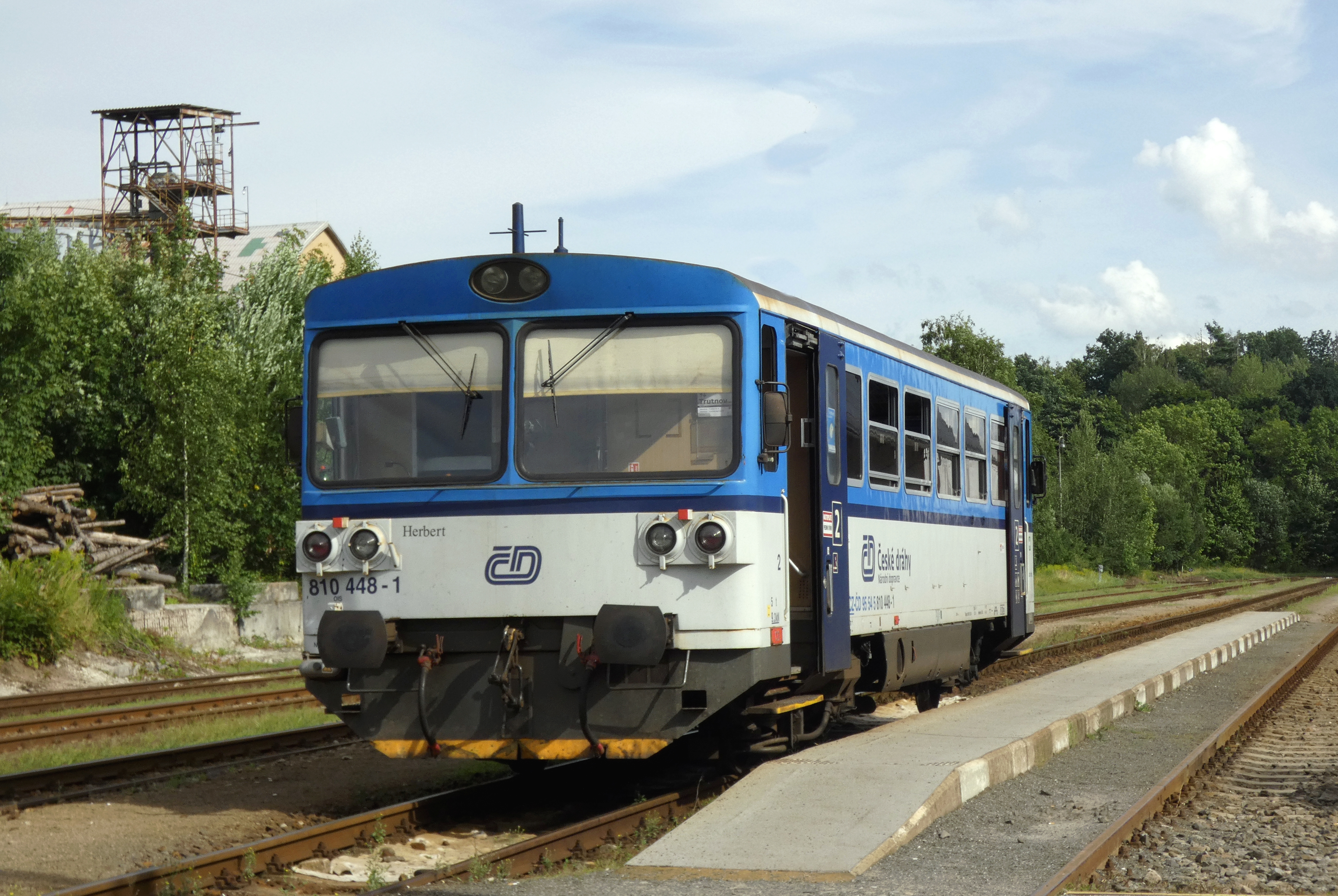
810 448–1 in Vrchlabí

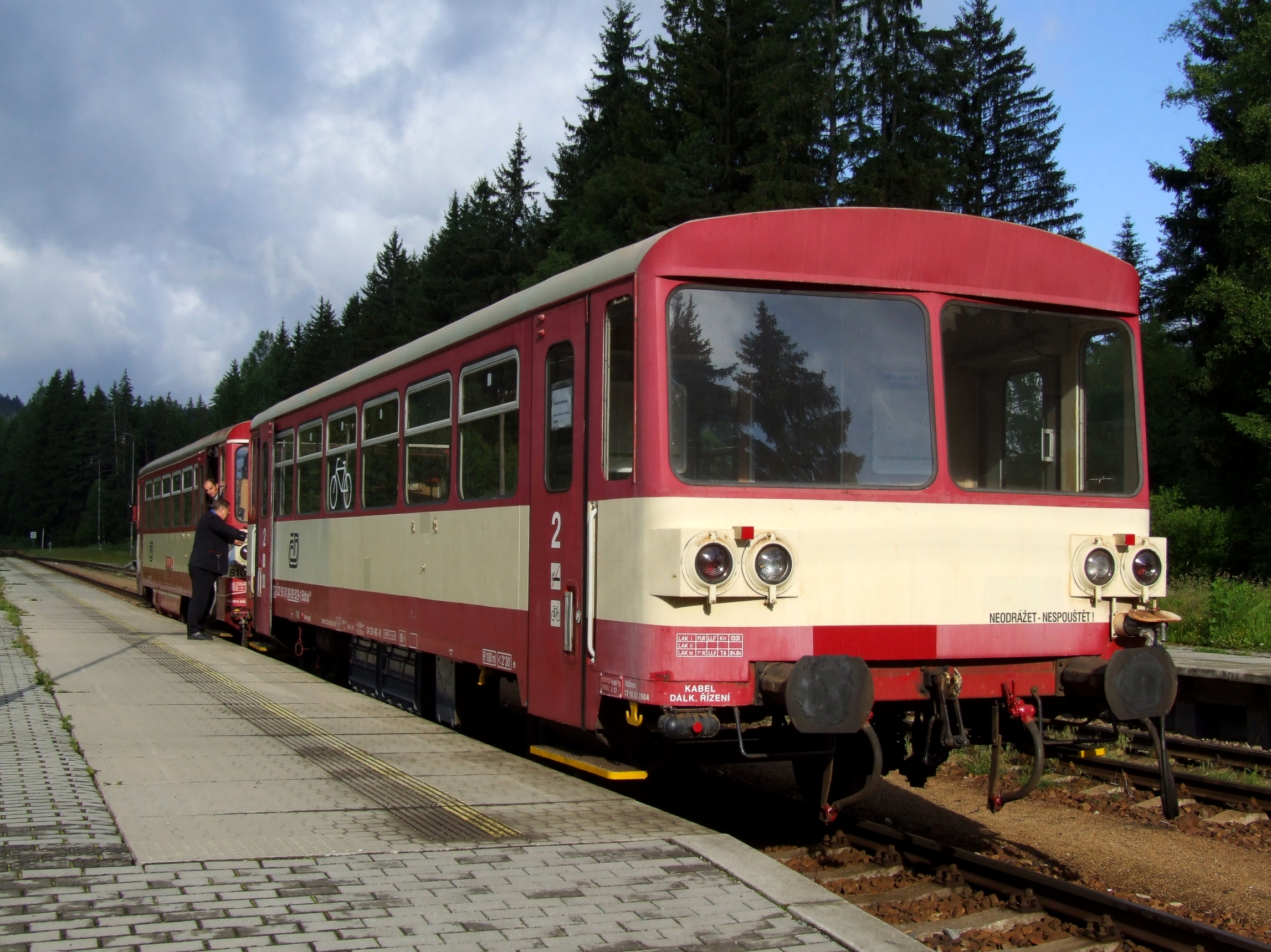
The single Class 010 passenger car in Černý Kříž

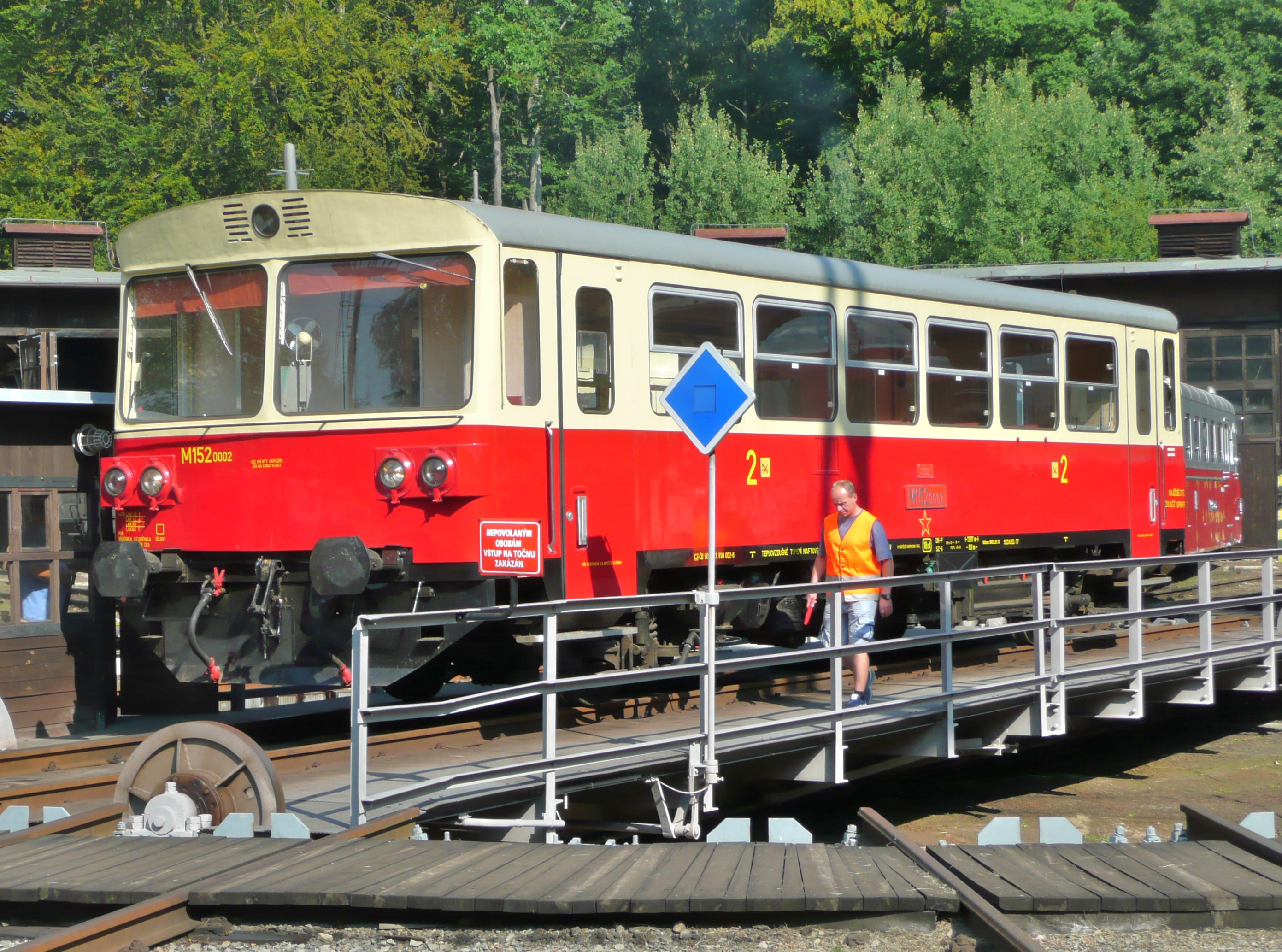
A second prototype of the M 152.0 in original livery

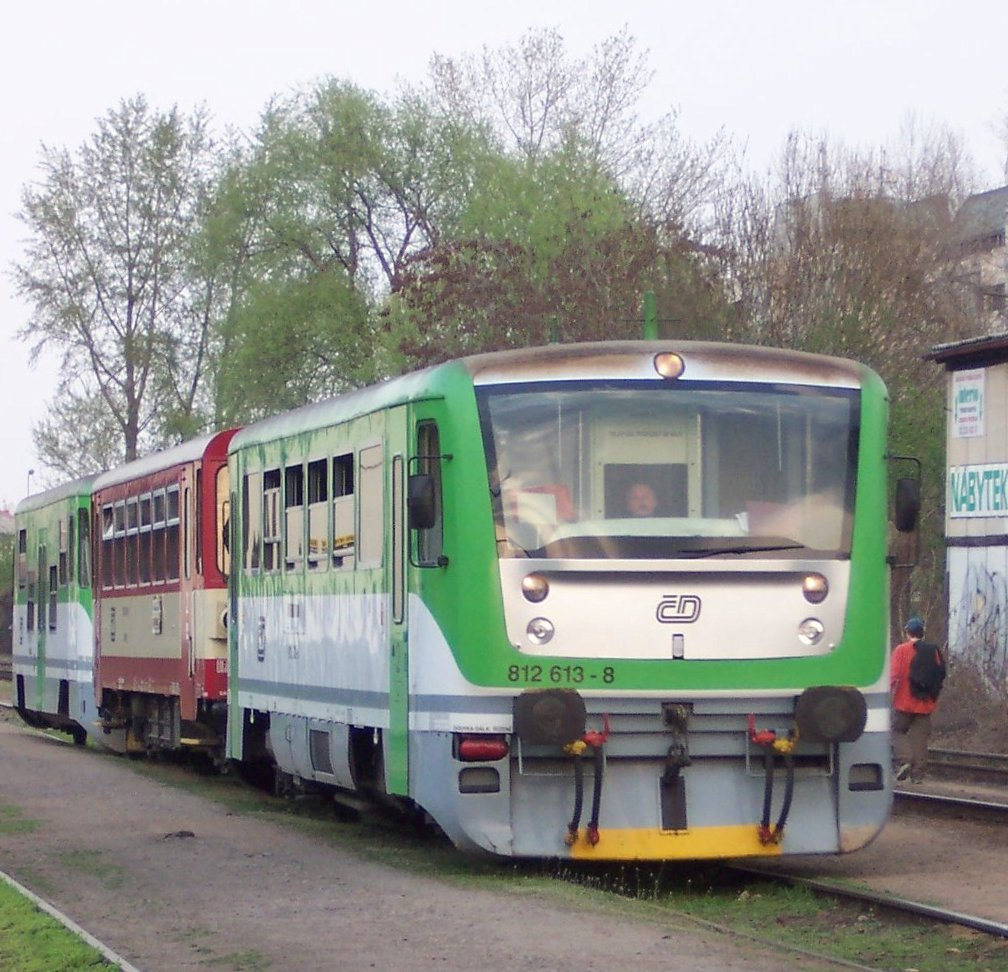
812 613, a refurbishment prototype (nicknamed Esmeralda (ČD))

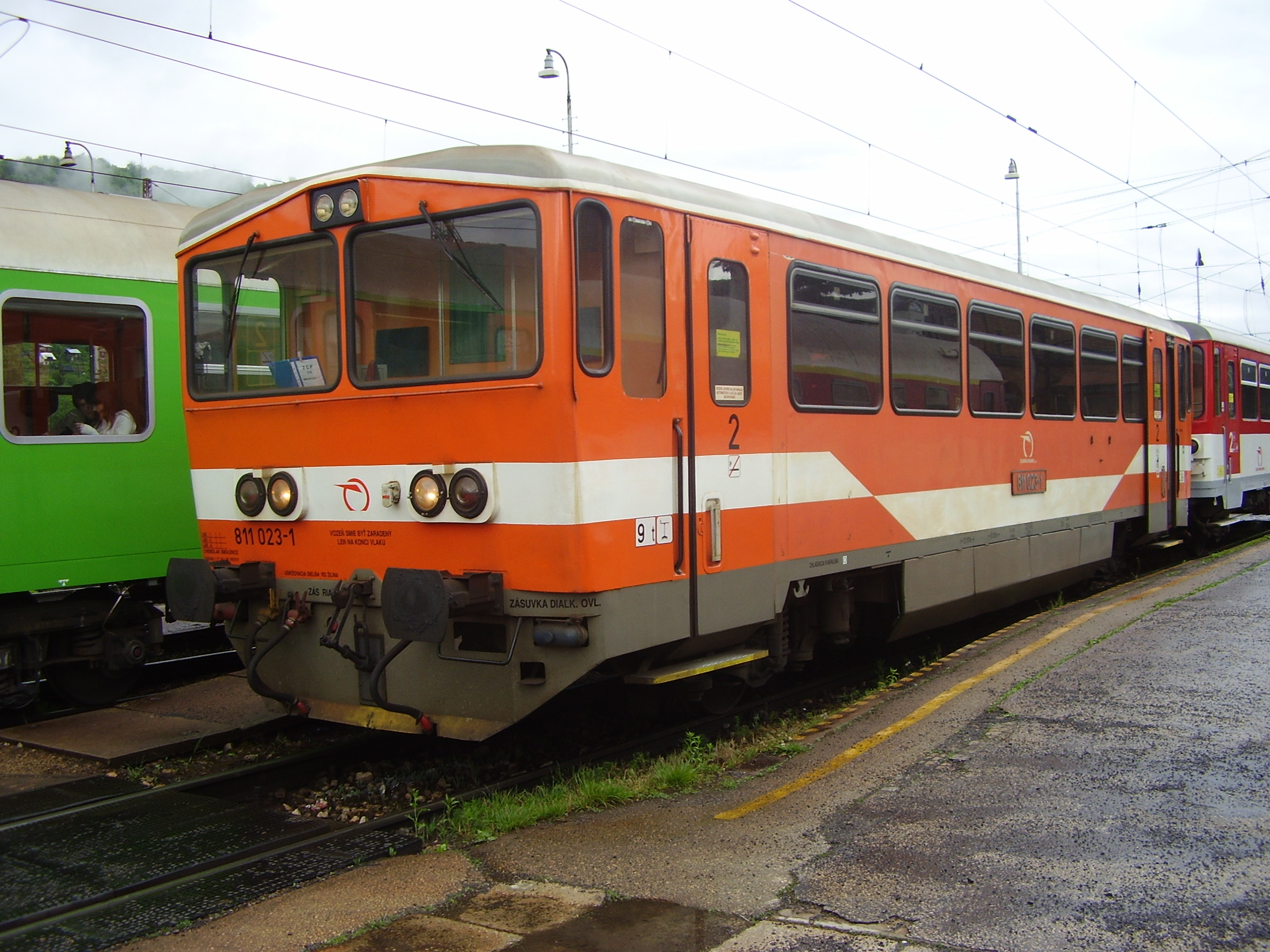
811 ZSSK, another refurbishment

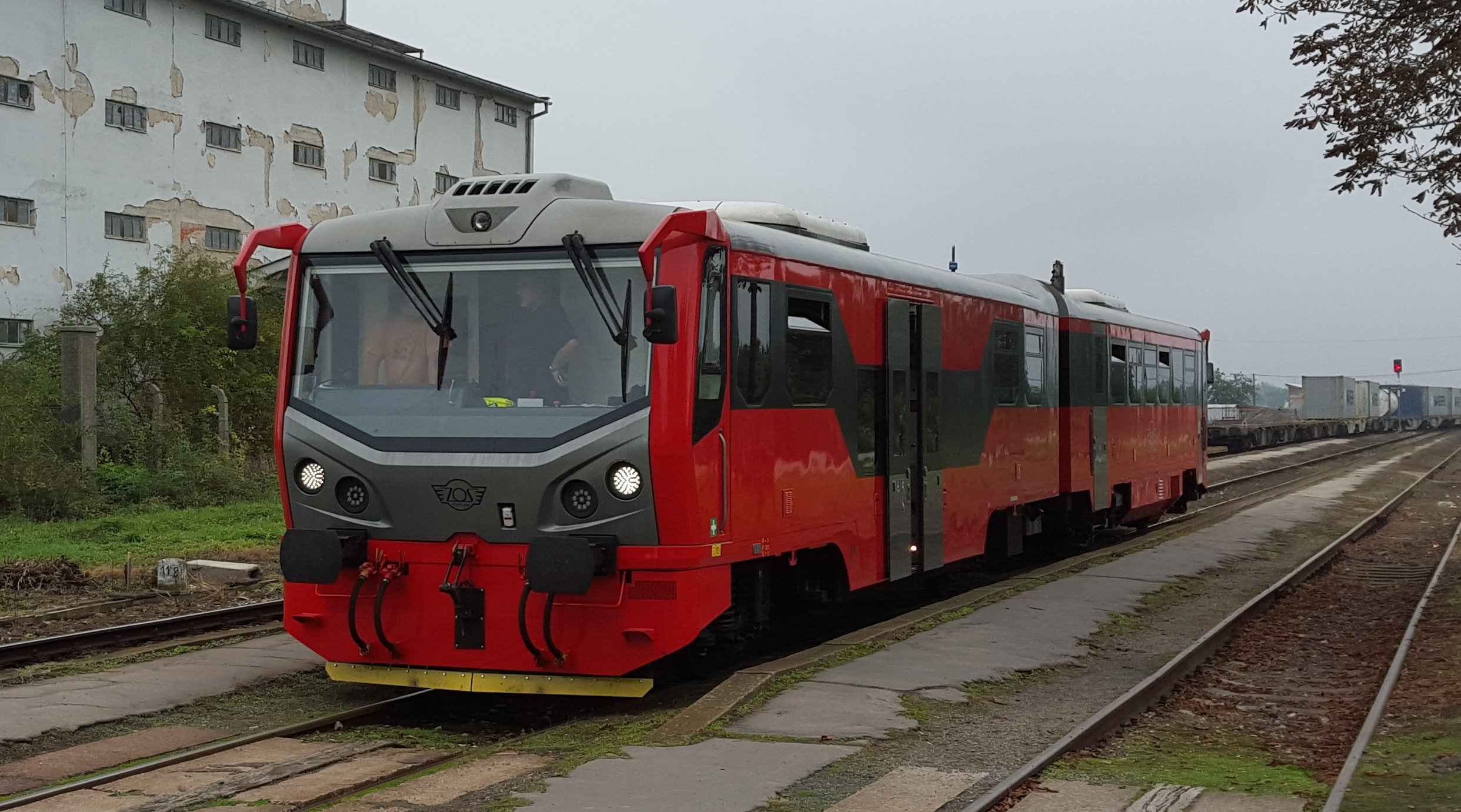
813.11 ZSSK, another refurbishment

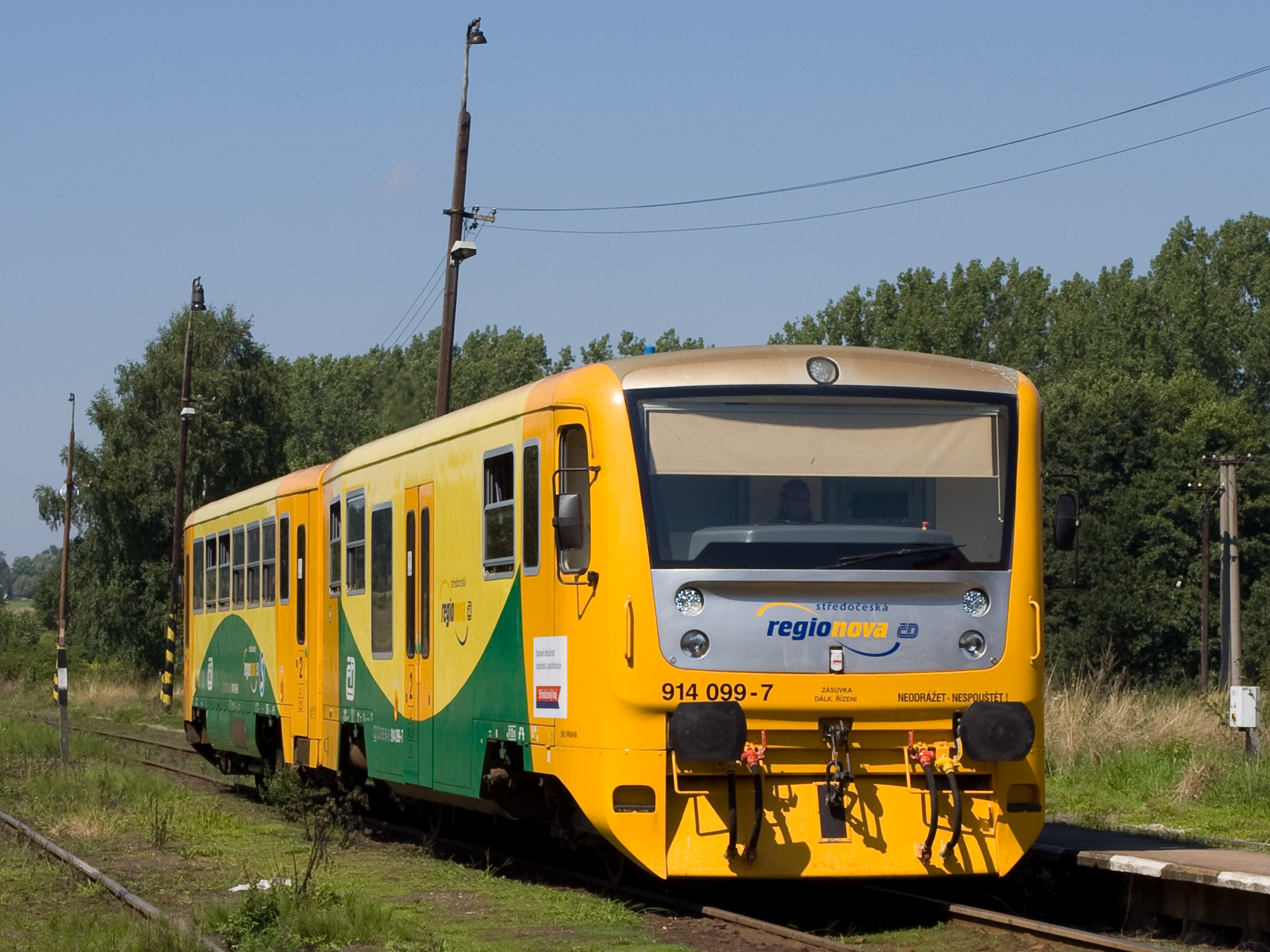
ČD Class 814, another refurbishment since 2005

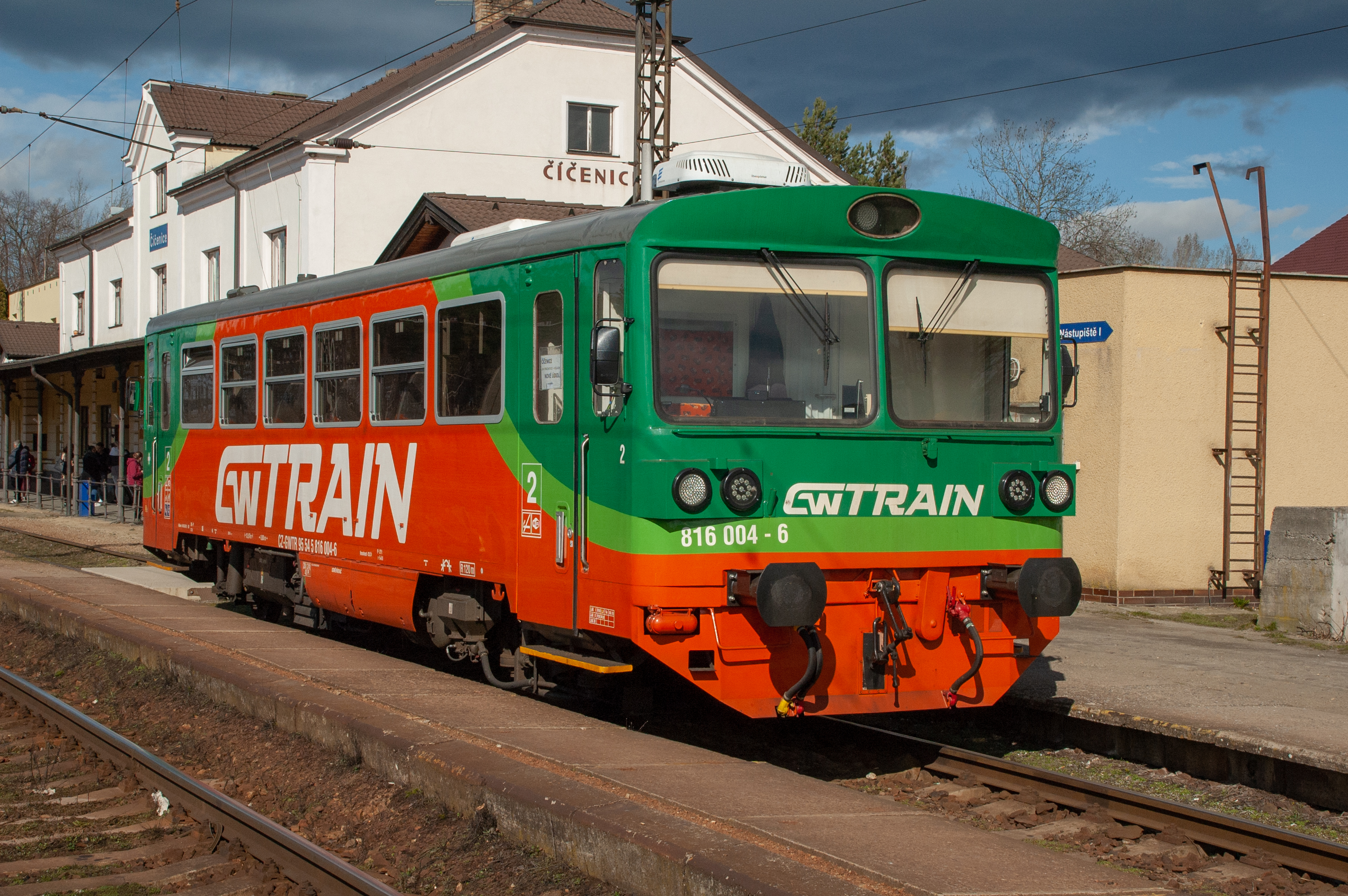
816, another refurbishment

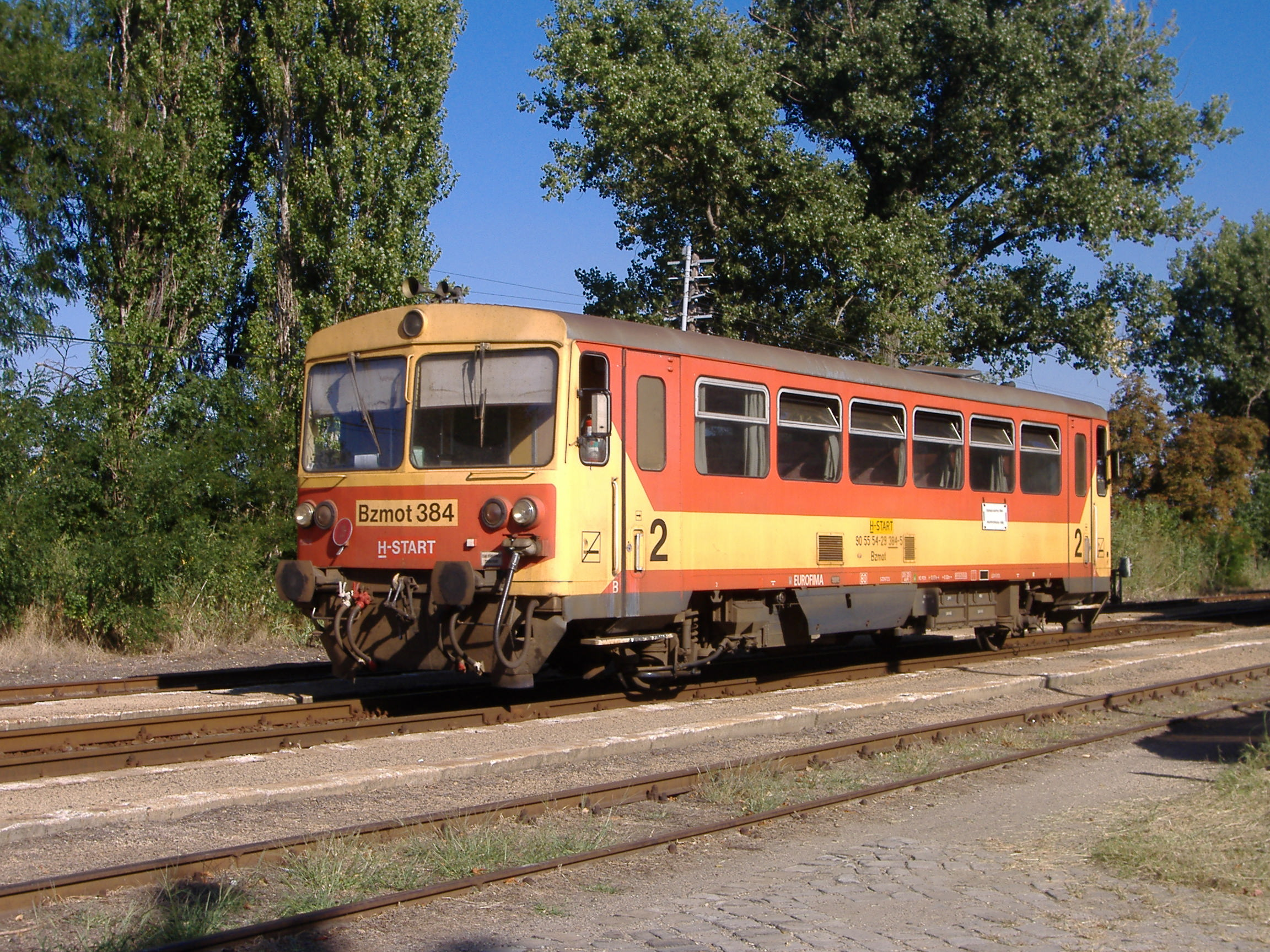
MÁV Bzmot 384 in Makó, Hungary

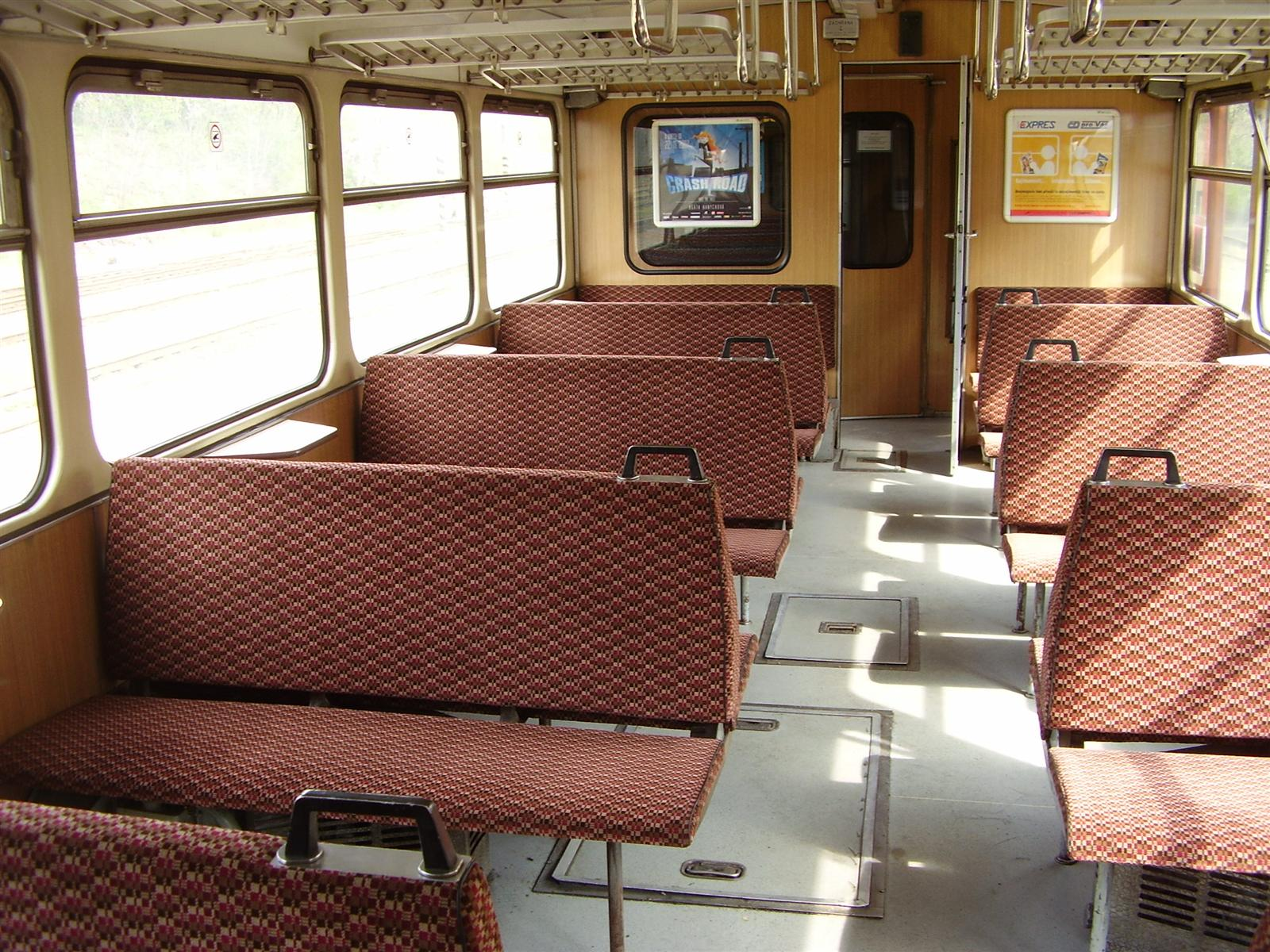
The original passenger seating area in an 810

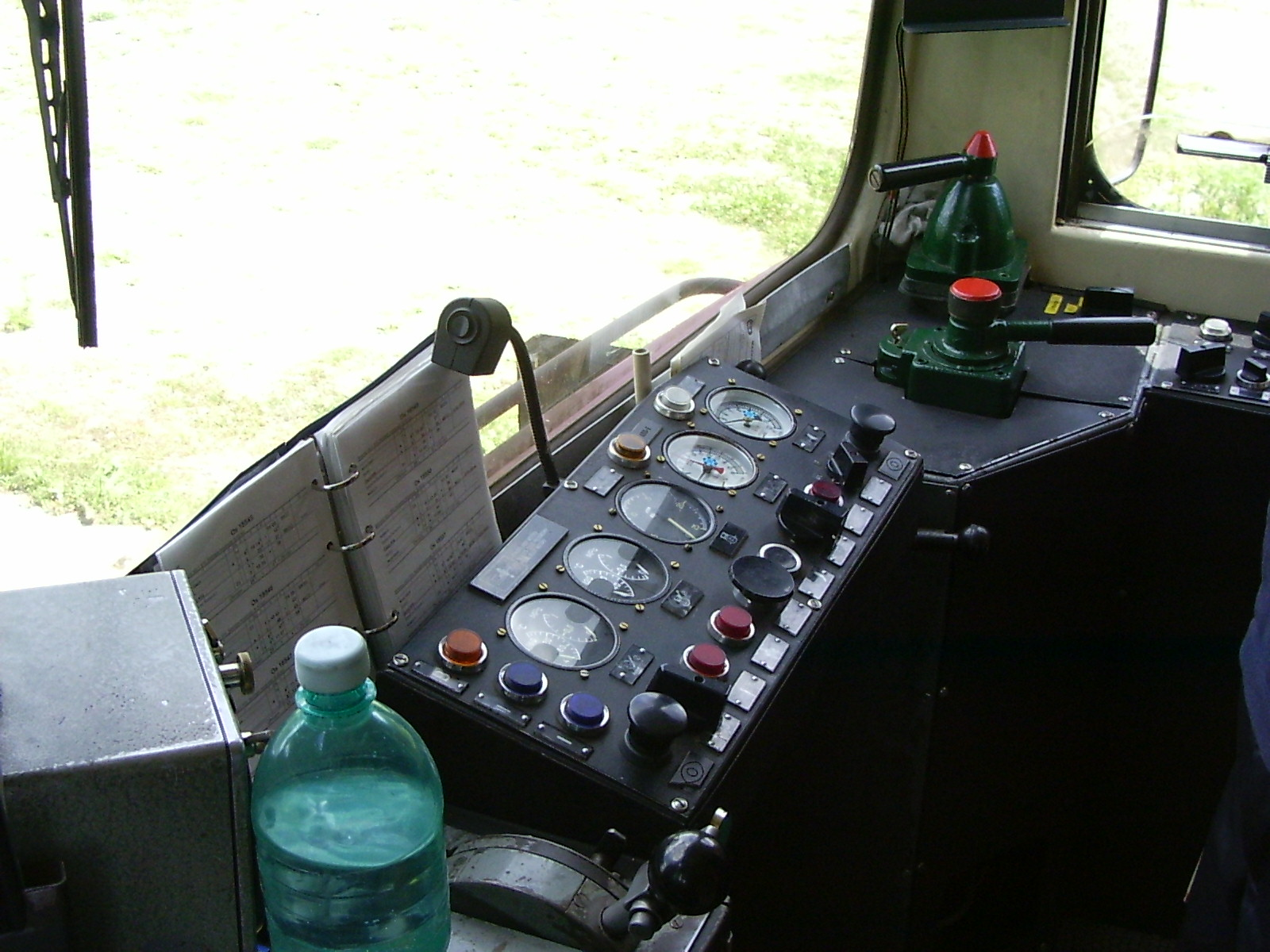
Driver's cab
