= ČD Class 814 =

Diesel multiple unit

ČD class 814 Regionova
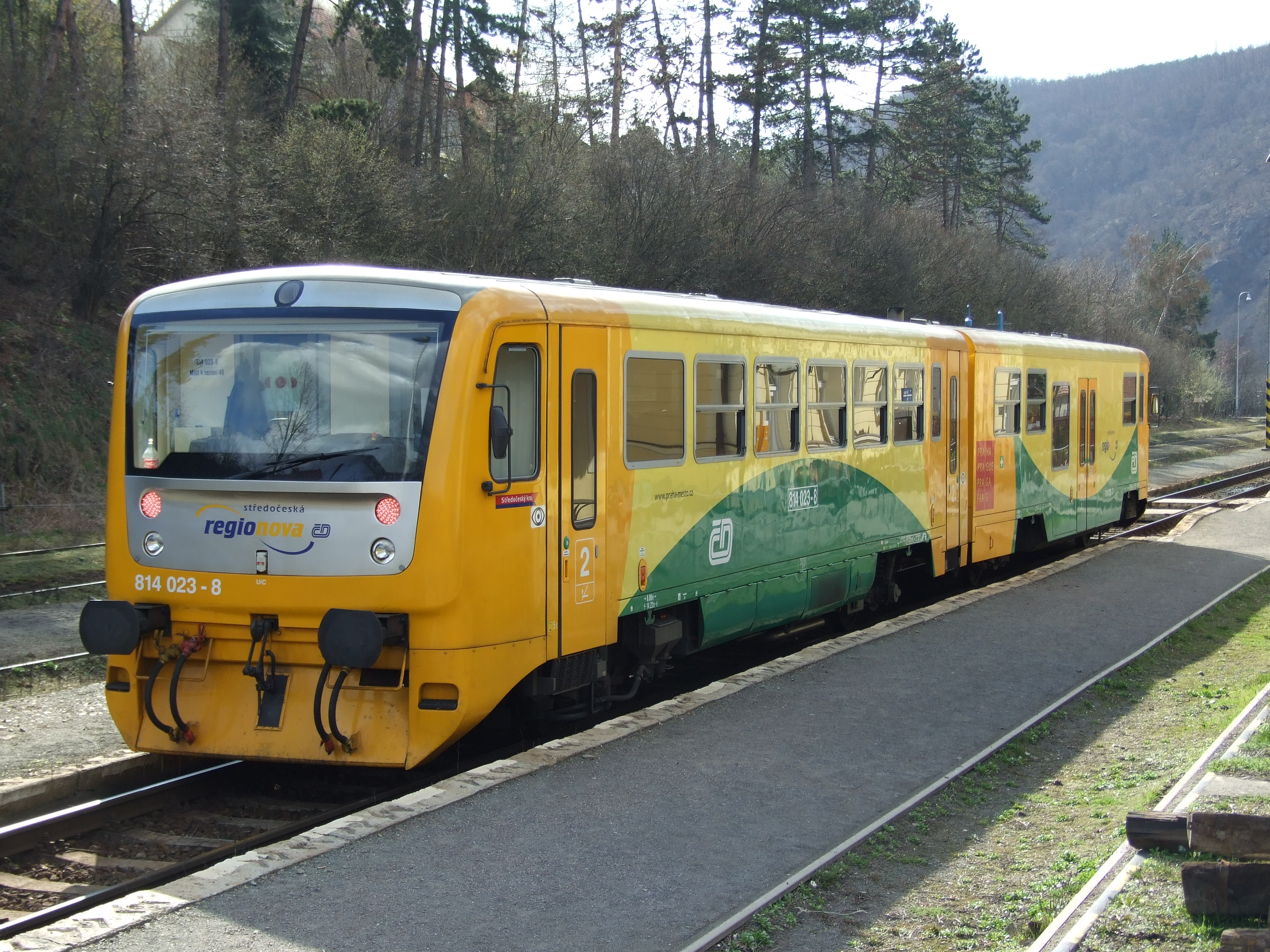
- 2 car Regionova at Vrané nad Vltavou station
- Manufacturers: PARS nova a subsidiary of Škoda Transportation
- Constructed: 1973–1984 as class 810 rebuilt 2005-2012
- Number built: 210
- Formation: Two cars
- Fleet numbers: 814.001/914.001 to 814.310/914.310
- Operator: České dráhy

Specifications
- Car length: 14,220 mm (46 ft 8 in); 13,970 mm (45 ft 10 in)
- Width: 3,073 mm (10 ft 1.0 in)
- Height: 3,420 mm (11 ft 3 in)
- Wheelbase: 8,000 mm (26 ft 3 in)
- Maximum speed: 80 km/h (50 mph)
- Weight: 22+17 t
- Axle load: 14 t
- Prime movers: LIAZ M 1.2C ML 640,Diesels, 1950 rpm
- Power output: 242 kW (325 bhp)
- Transmission: Hydraulic
- UIC classification: A′1′+1′1′
- Multiple working: Yes
- Track gauge: 1,435 mm (4 ft 8 1/2 in)

ČD class 814.2
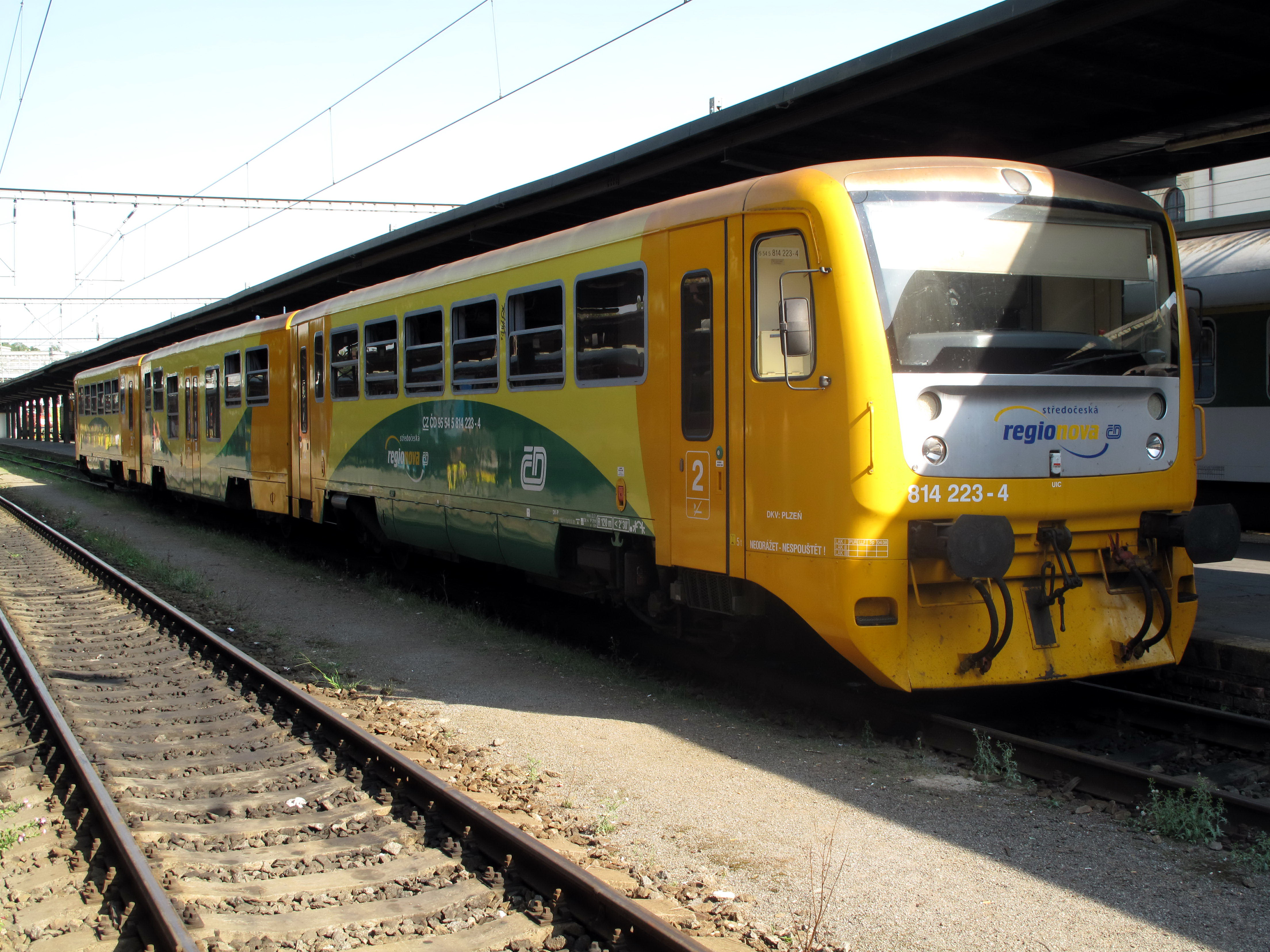
- 3 car Regionova at Praha Masarykovo nádraží station
- Manufacturer: Three cars
- Number built: 26
- Number in service: 26
- Fleet numbers: 814.201-0/014.001-2/814.202-8 to 814.251-5/014.026-9/814.252-3
- Operator: České dráhy

Specifications
- Car length: 14.22 m (46 ft 8 in)
- Weight: 22+x+22 t
- Power output: 484 kW (649 bhp)
- UIC classification: A′1′+1′1′+1′A′

The ČD class 814 diesel multiple units (colloquially known as "Regionova") are a development of the prototype 812 613 and replace the earlier class 810 DMUs on local railways České dráhy in the Czech Republic. They are formed as 2 cars (Class 814 Driving Motor + Class 914 Driving Trailer) and 3 cars (814 Driving Motor + 014 Trailer + 814 Driving Motor). They are built by Pars Nova of Šumperk.

== Železnice Desná ==
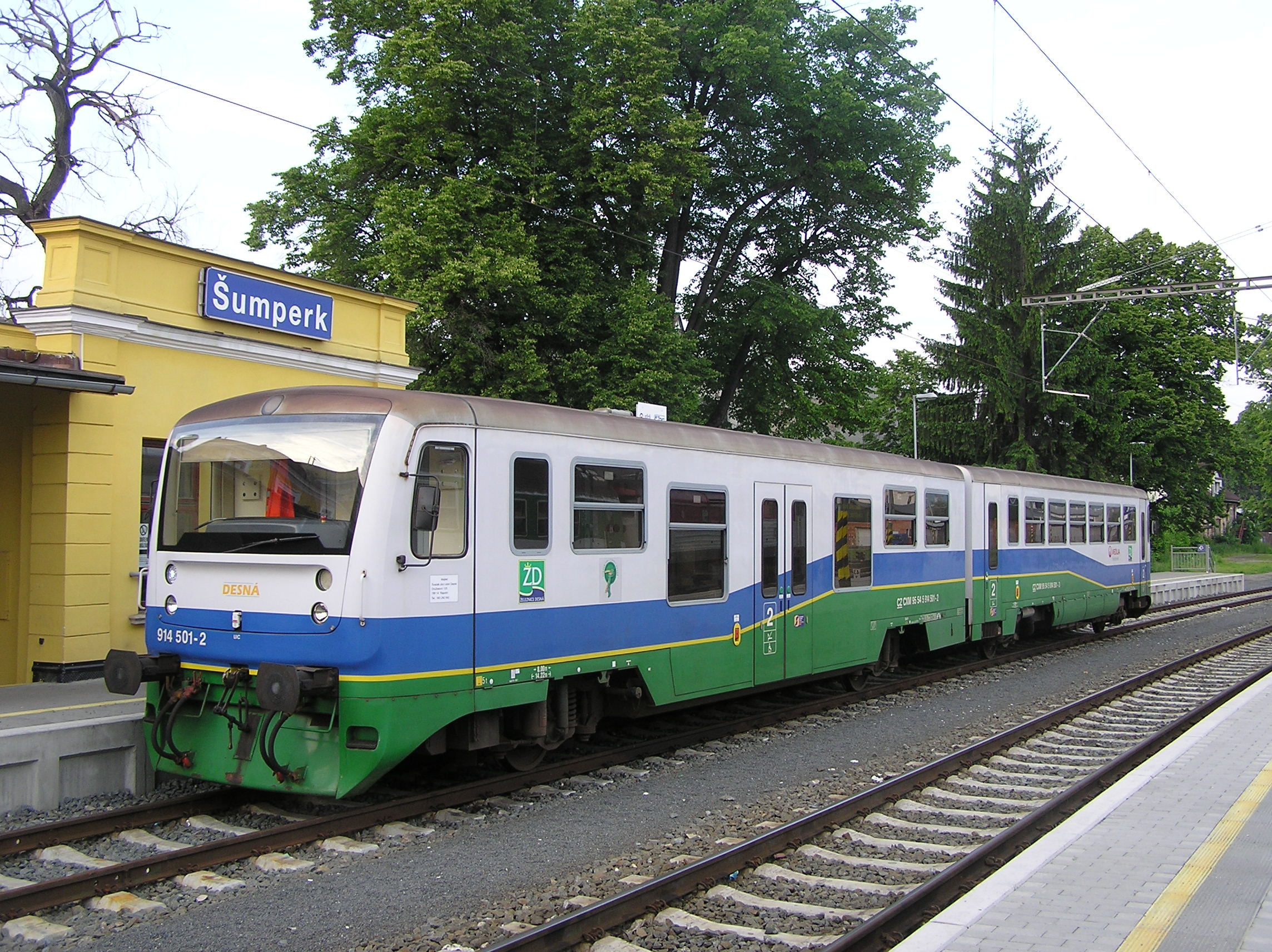
814 501/914 501 at Šumperk station

One unit, numbered 814 501-3/914 501-2 is in use with regional operator Železnice Desná.
