= Transport in Austria =

A map of the Austrian Autobahn and Schnellstraße system.

Austria has a highly developed and efficient transport system that includes road, rail, air, and water networks. The country’s rail system is extensive and reliable. High-speed trains connect major cities like Vienna, Salzburg, and Innsbruck, while regional trains serve smaller towns. International train services link Austria with neighboring countries, including Germany, Switzerland, Italy, and Hungary, making rail travel a convenient option for both domestic and cross-border journeys.

Austria is also highly developed with well-maintained highways (Autobahns) and roads connecting all parts of the country. Driving is common, supported by strict traffic regulations and a toll system on major highways. Public buses and long-distance coaches provide additional options, especially for rural areas that are less accessible by train.

Urban transport is particularly efficient in Austrian cities. Vienna, Graz, and Linz, for example, have extensive networks of metros (U-Bahn), trams, buses, and suburban trains (S-Bahn), offering residents and visitors reliable and punctual public transport. Vienna is especially known for its comprehensive and user-friendly public transport system, which is widely used across the city.

Air transport connects Austria to the rest of the world, with Vienna International Airport serving as the main hub. While water transport is less significant, the Danube River allows for some passenger and freight movement, linking Austria with other Central and Eastern European countries. Cycling has also become increasingly popular, with dedicated bike lanes in cities and scenic routes in rural areas and the Alps, supporting sustainable and recreational travel.

== Air ==
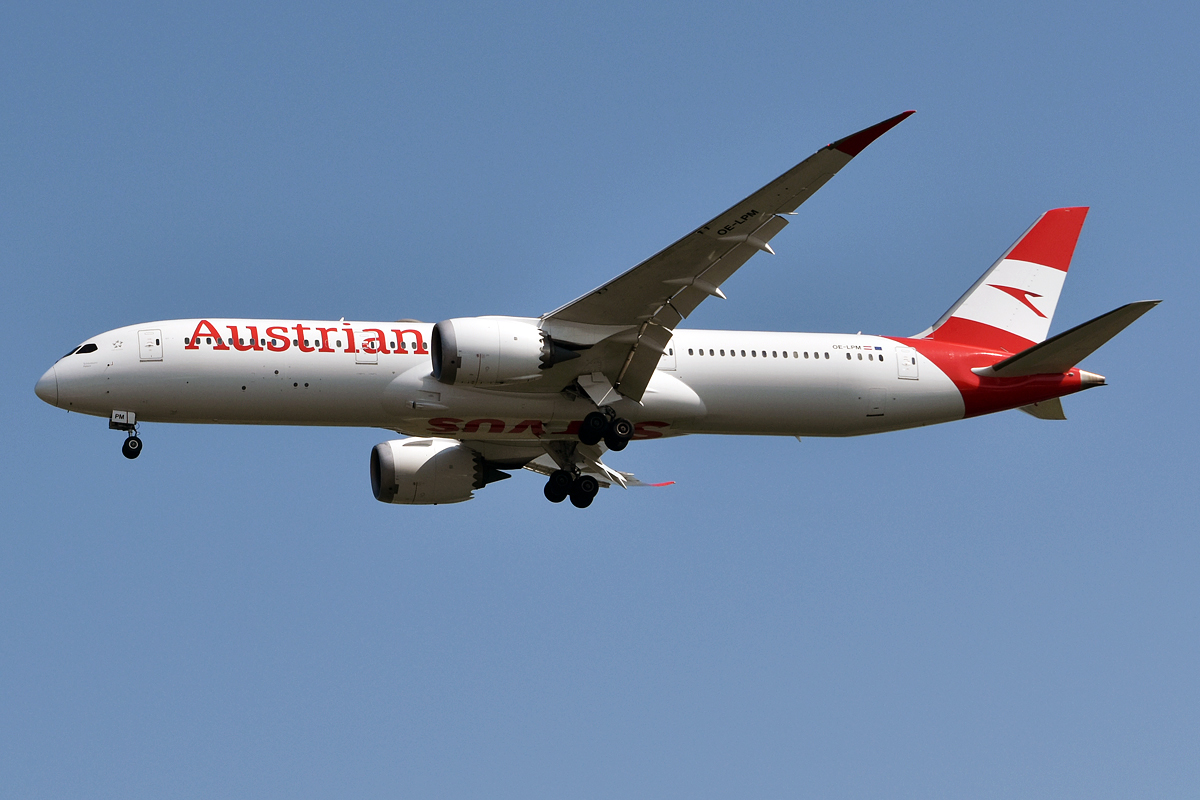
Boeing 787-9 in Austrian Airlines livery.

Austria has 6 major airports, 55 airports in total and two heliports. The largest by passenger volume is Vienna International Airport. Secondary airports include Graz, Linz, Innsbruck, Salzburg and Klagenfurt.

Austrian Airlines is the flag carrier of Austria and a subsidiary of Lufthansa, the flag carrier of Germany. The airline is headquartered on the grounds of Vienna International Airport in Schwechat where it also maintains its hub. The airline is a member of the Star Alliance.

== Rail ==
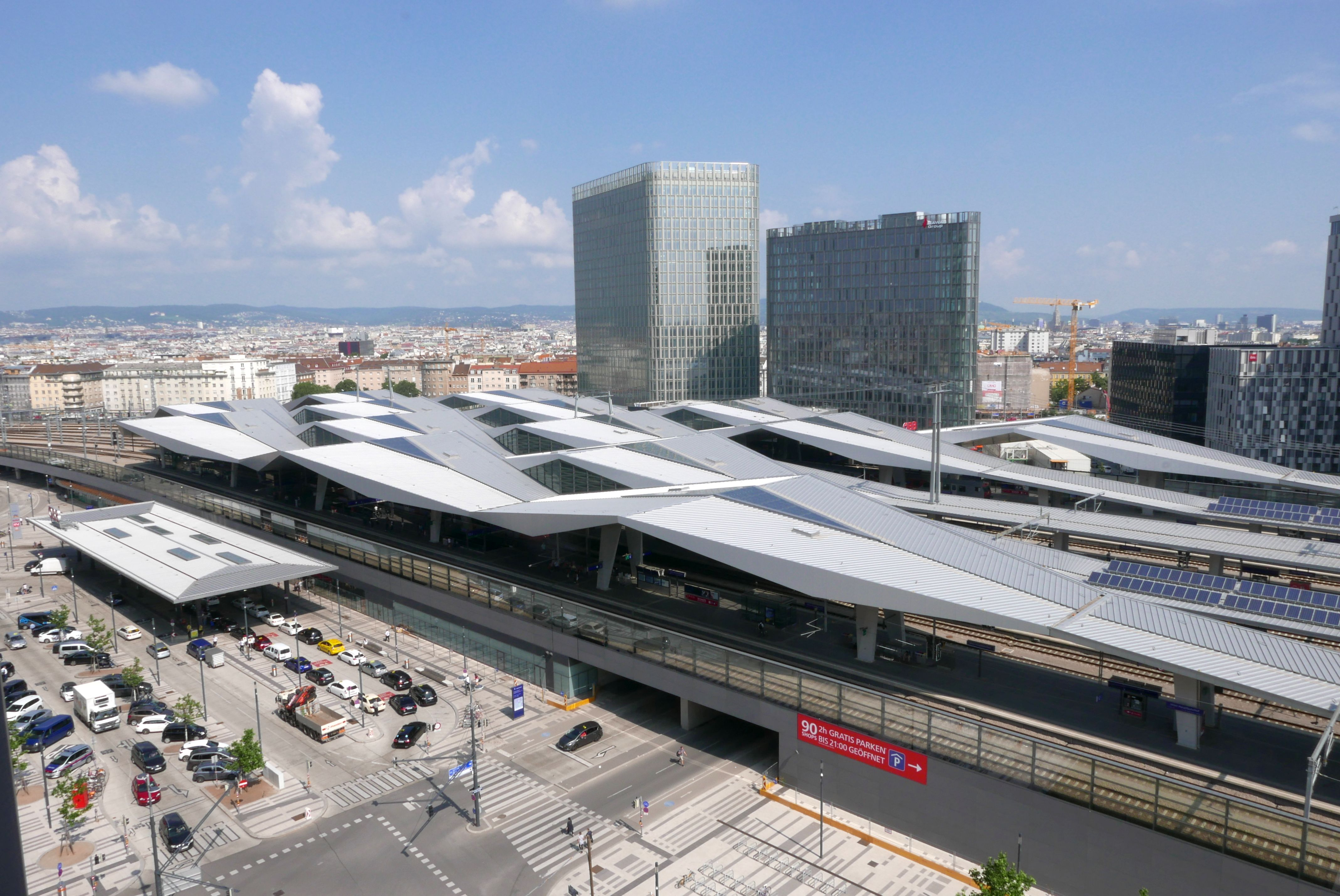
Vienna mainstation.

The national railway system of Austria is the Österreichische Bundesbahnen, or ÖBB. Besides, there are a few other railway companies in Austria.

The Austrian railway network has a length of 6,123 km (3,805 mi), 3,523 km (2,189 mi) of which are electrified. Most lines are in 1,435 mm (4 ft 8 1/2 in) standard gauge, while especially in the Alpine region there are several narrow-gauge railway lines and funiculars.

Within the European Union, Austria is among the leaders regarding the distance traveled by rail per inhabitant and year: 1,510 km (940 mi) in 2022. It was ranked fifth among national European rail systems in the 2017 European Railway Performance Index.

In Austria, many narrow gauge railways were constructed due to the difficult mountainous terrain. Many survive to this day as a common carrier or a heritage railway.

=== High-speed rail ===
Rather than build dedicated high-speed passenger rail lines, Austria has integrated fast, mixed-use segment in its national railway network. Most new high-speed rail sections have a continuous maximum design speed of 250 km/h (155 mph). Sections of the Western Railway (Austria) that connects Vienna to Salzburg, Munich and the western parts of the country were upgraded to 230 km/h. The Lower Inn Valley Railway in Tyrol has a top speed of 220 km/h. The Koralmbahn, the first entirely new railway line in the Second Austrian Republic opened in 2025. It includes a new 33 km (21 mi) tunnel (the Koralmtunnel) connecting the cities of Klagenfurt and Graz. Primarily built for intermodal freight transport, it is also used by passenger trains travelling at up to 250 km/h (155 mph). It reduced travel times between Klagenfurt and Graz will from three hours to less than one hour.

The 56 km (35 mi) Brenner Base Tunnel under construction will allow speeds of up to 250 km/h (155 mph) while also reducing gradients for freight and intermodal trains.

=== Night trains ===
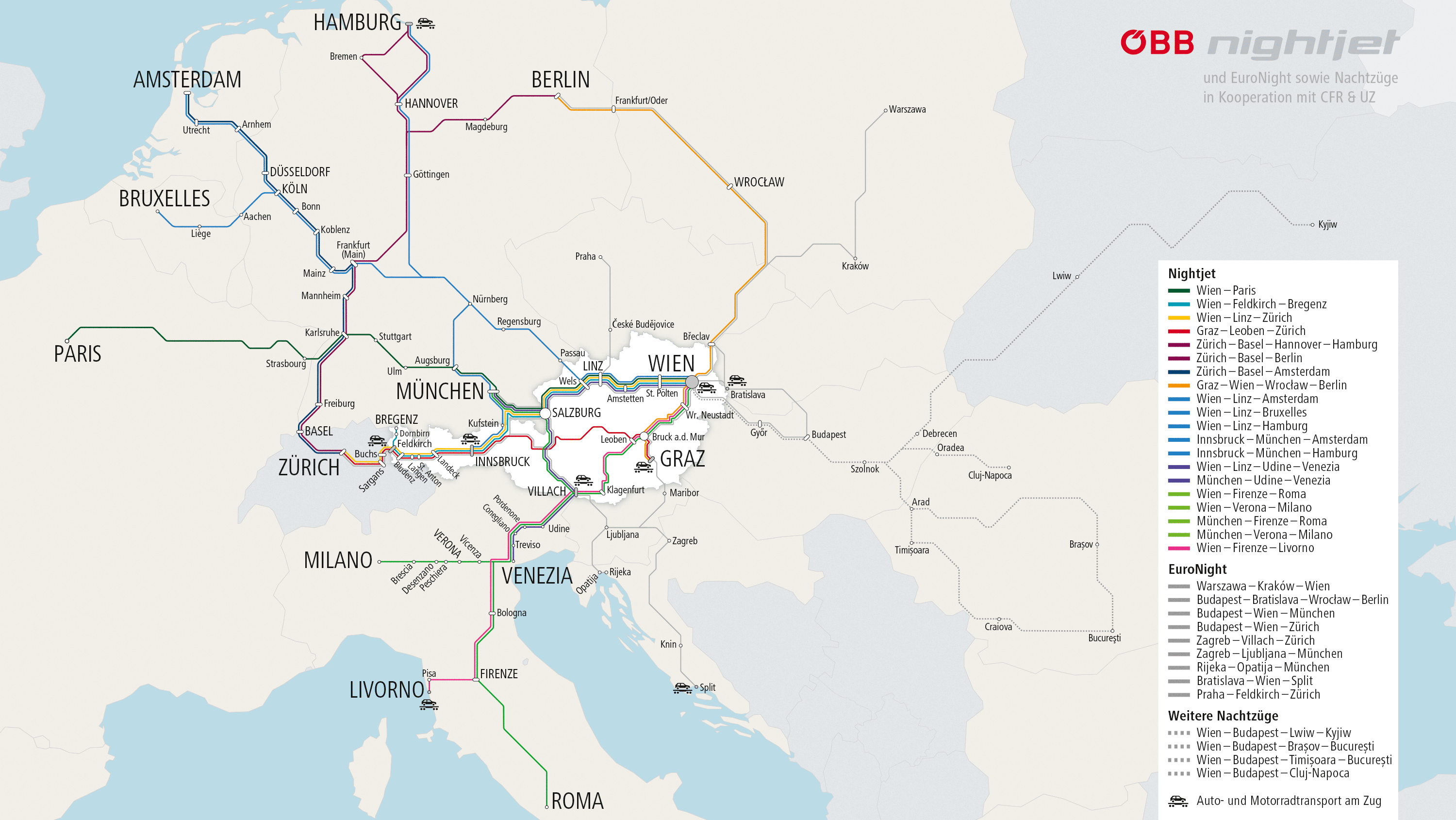
Nightjet Route Map (2023)

The Nightjet of the Austrian Federal Railways (ÖBB) runs routes out of Austria to international overnight destinations in Italy, Germany, France, Belgium, Switzerland and more.

Nightjet trains offers beds in sleeper carriages (Nightjet's most comfortable service category), couchette carriages, and seated carriages. On certain connections, cars can also be transported on the train. Bikes can be transported in a bike transport bag, or on some connections also in special bike racks.

=== Funiculars ===
- Serfaus: see Serfaus U-Bahn, complete ban on cars in the village center

== Rapid transit ==
=== Metro ===
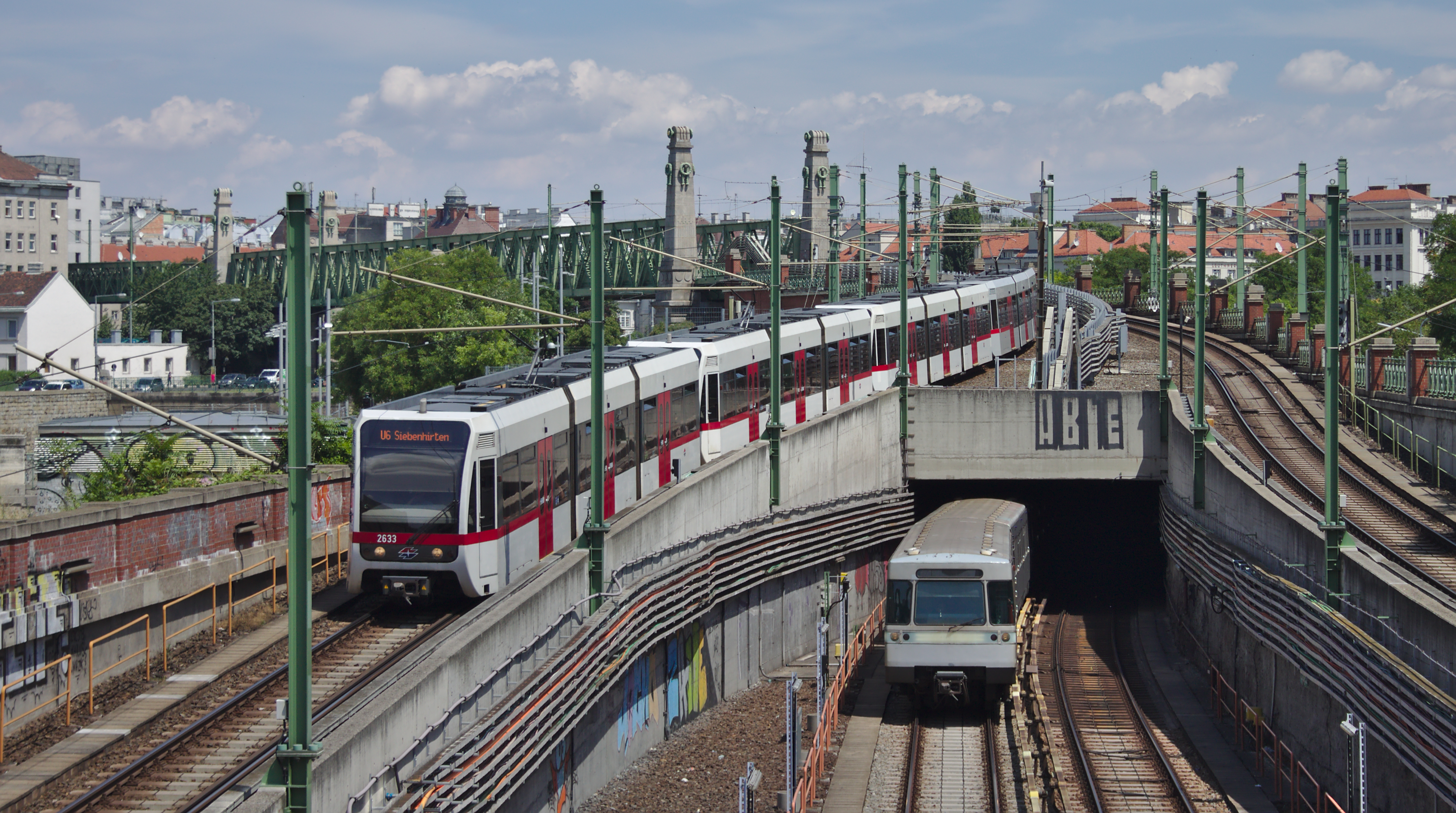
Train sets of lines U6 and U4 entering Längenfeldgasse interchange.

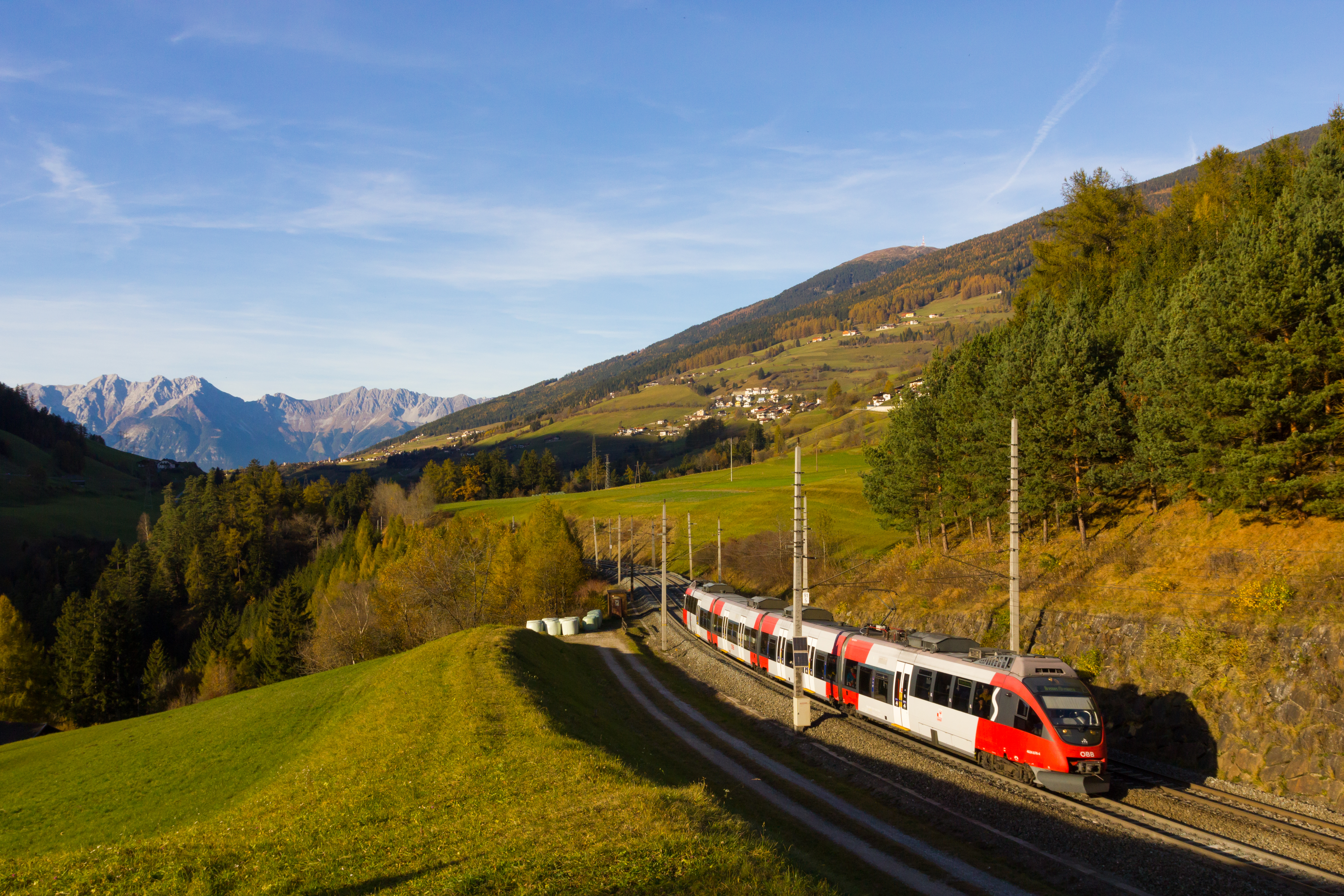
An S-Bahn Talent-train near Matrei am Brenner.

One such rapid transit exists in Austria's capital, Vienna: the U-Bahn. 459.8 million passengers rode the U-Bahn in 2019. Lines are designated by a number and the prefix "U" (for U-Bahn) and identified on station signage and related literature by a colour. There are five lines; U1, U2, U3, U4 and U6.

The modern-day U-Bahn opened on 25 February 1978, after test operations that began on 8 May 1976. Parts of two of the lines, designated U4 and U6, date back to the Stadtbahn ("city railway") system, which opened in 1898. Parts of the U2 and U6 lines began as subway tunnels built to accommodate earlier tram lines. Only the U1 and U3 were built wholly as new subway lines.

=== S-Bahn ===
7 cities have suburban rail systems called the S-Bahn.

- Klagenfurt: Carinthia S-Bahn
- Graz: Styria S-Bahn
- Linz: Upper Austria S-Bahn
- Innsbruck: Tyrol S-Bahn
- Salzburg: Salzburg S-Bahn
- Vienna: Vienna S-Bahn
- Vorarlberg state: Vorarlberg S-Bahn

== Public transport ==
=== Tram ===
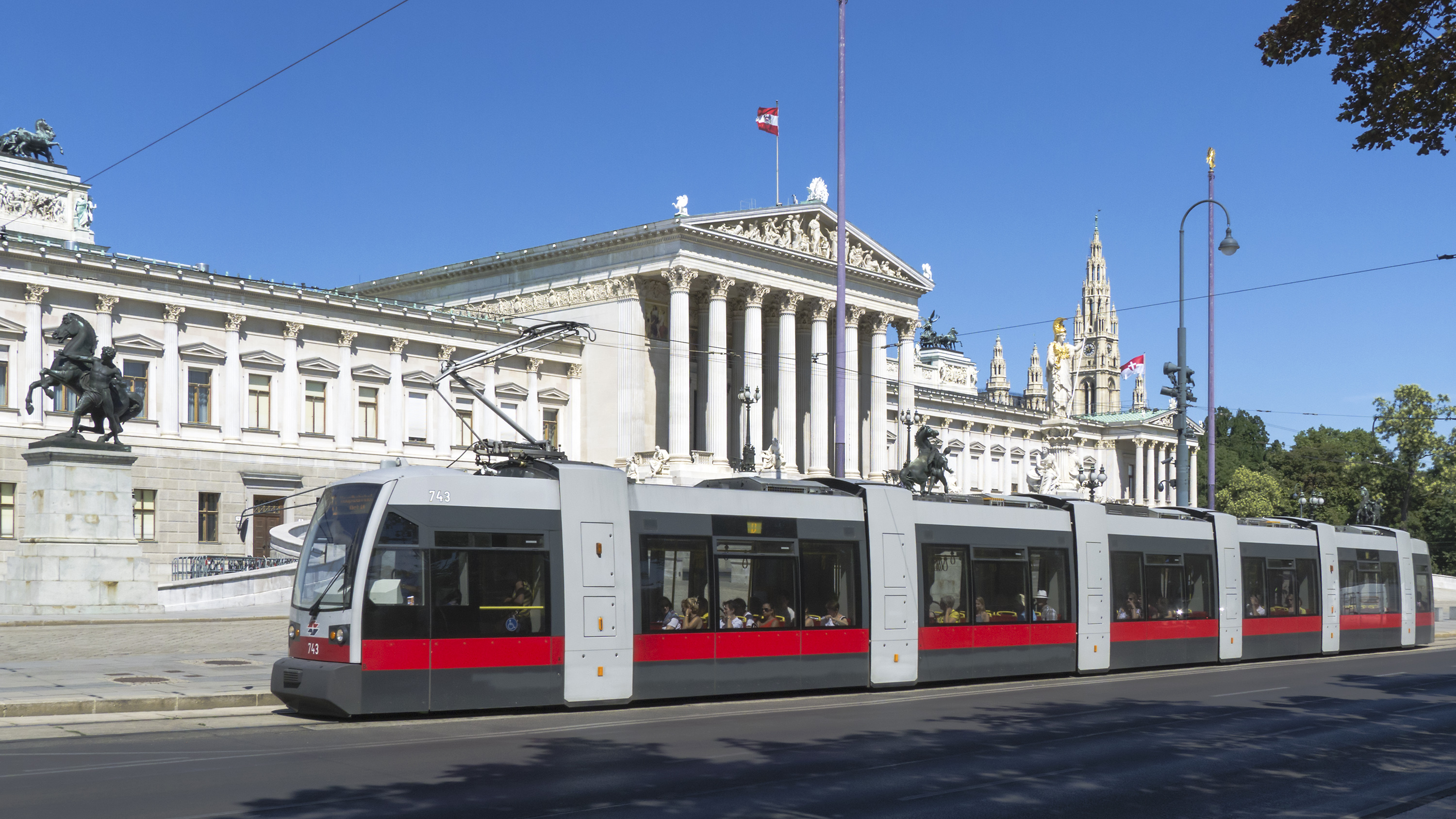
Vienna Line D.

Trams in Austria begin their history in 1870, with a first horse-drawn system in Vienna. Austria has varying gauges on its tram systems; in Graz and in Vienna, trams run on the 1,435 mm (4 ft 8 1/2 in) standard gauge. In Innsbruck and Gmunden, trams drop to use the 1,000 mm (3 ft 3 3/8 in) gauge. Completing the tram system in Austria is the fifth system in Linz, where stock rolls on the unusual track gauge of 900 mm (2 ft 11 7/16 in). The Gmunden line's maximum gradient of 10.0% makes it one of the world's steepest surviving adhesion-only tram lines.

=== Trolleybus ===
Historically, trolleybuses have served a number of Austrian cities. Currently, the only trolleybus systems still in operation are those in Linz and in Salzburg, and the Salzburg system is the largest of all such systems in the German-speaking countries of Europe. However, the Innsbruck trolleybus system, which previously existed from 1944 to 1976 and again from 1988 to 2007, is now planned to reopen in 2029.

== Road ==
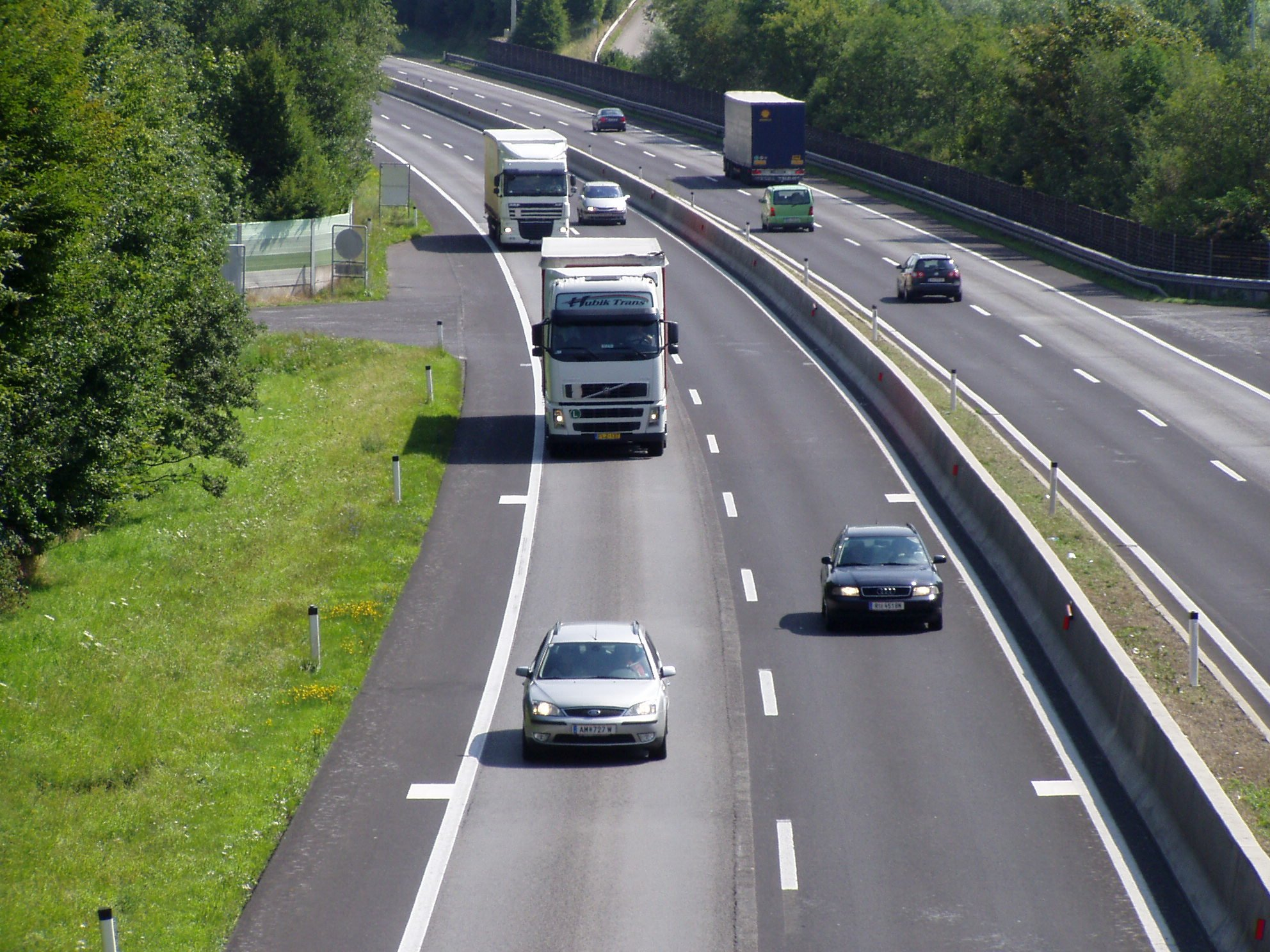
Innkreis Autobahn (A8) in Pichl bei Wels.

In Austria, national highways are referred to as Bundesstrassen. Higher-capacity and higher-speed Bundesstrassen are further categorized into Autobahns and Schnellstrassen (expressways).

=== Traffic laws ===
The traffic signs adhere to the Vienna Convention on Road Signs and Signals.

The general speed limits are:

- in inhabited areas 50 km/h
- outside of inhabited areas 100 km/h
- on marked expressways 100 km/h
- on marked motorways 130 km/h

=== Motorways ===
The Austrian autobahns are controlled-access highways in Austria. They are officially called Bundesstraßen A (Bundesautobahnen) under the authority of the Federal Government according to the Austrian Federal Road Act (Bundesstraßengesetz), not to be confused with the former Bundesstraßen highways maintained by the Austrian states since 2002. The allowed topspeed is 130 km/h for cars up to 3500 kg.

Austria currently has 18 autobahns, built and maintained by the self-financed ASFiNAG stock company in Vienna and earns revenue from road user charges and tolls. Each route bears a number as well as an official name with local reference, which, however, is not displayed on road signs. The current Austrian Autobahn network has a total length of 1,720 km (1,070 mi). The system is going to be expanded; one autobahn is currently under construction, and one more is planned. The transit traffic across the main chain of the Alps, especially by trucks, has led to a considerable environmental load to the fragile Alpine ecosystem. Several action groups urge the transfer of freight transport from road to rail. In 1991, Austria signed the Alpine Convention on the protection of the natural environment.

- A1 (Westautobahn)
- A2 (Südautobahn)
- A3 (Südostautobahn)
- A4 (Ostautobahn)
- A5 (Nordautobahn, planned)
- A6 (Nordostautobahn)
- A7 (Mühlkreisautobahn)
- A8 (Innkreisautobahn)
- A9 (Pyhrnautobahn)
- A10 (Tauernautobahn)
- A11 (Karawankenautobahn)
- A12 (Inntalautobahn)
- A13 (Brennerautobahn)
- A14 (Rheintalautobahn)
- A21 (Wiener Außenringautobahn)
- A22 (Donauuferautobahn)
- A23 (Südosttangente)
- A24 (Verbindungsspange Rothneusiedel, planned)
- A25 (Welser Autobahn)
- A26 (Linzerautobahn, planned)

=== Electric vehicles ===
As of October 2022, there were 100,000 electric vehicles in Austria, equivalent to 2% of all vehicles in the country. As of 2021, 13.9% of new cars registered in Austria were electric.

== Cable transport ==
Aerial tramways / cable cars

Gondola lifts

Funiculars

Funitels

== Other ==
=== Waterways ===
358 km, mainly along the Danube

=== Pipelines ===
- crude oil: 663 km (208)
- gas: 2,721 km
- refined products: 157 km

=== Ports and harbours ===
All ports access the Danube.

- Enns
- Krems
- Linz
- Vienna

All Austrian ports are via the Rhine-Main-Danube Canal also connected to the port of Rotterdam in the Netherlands.
