= Autobahns of Austria =

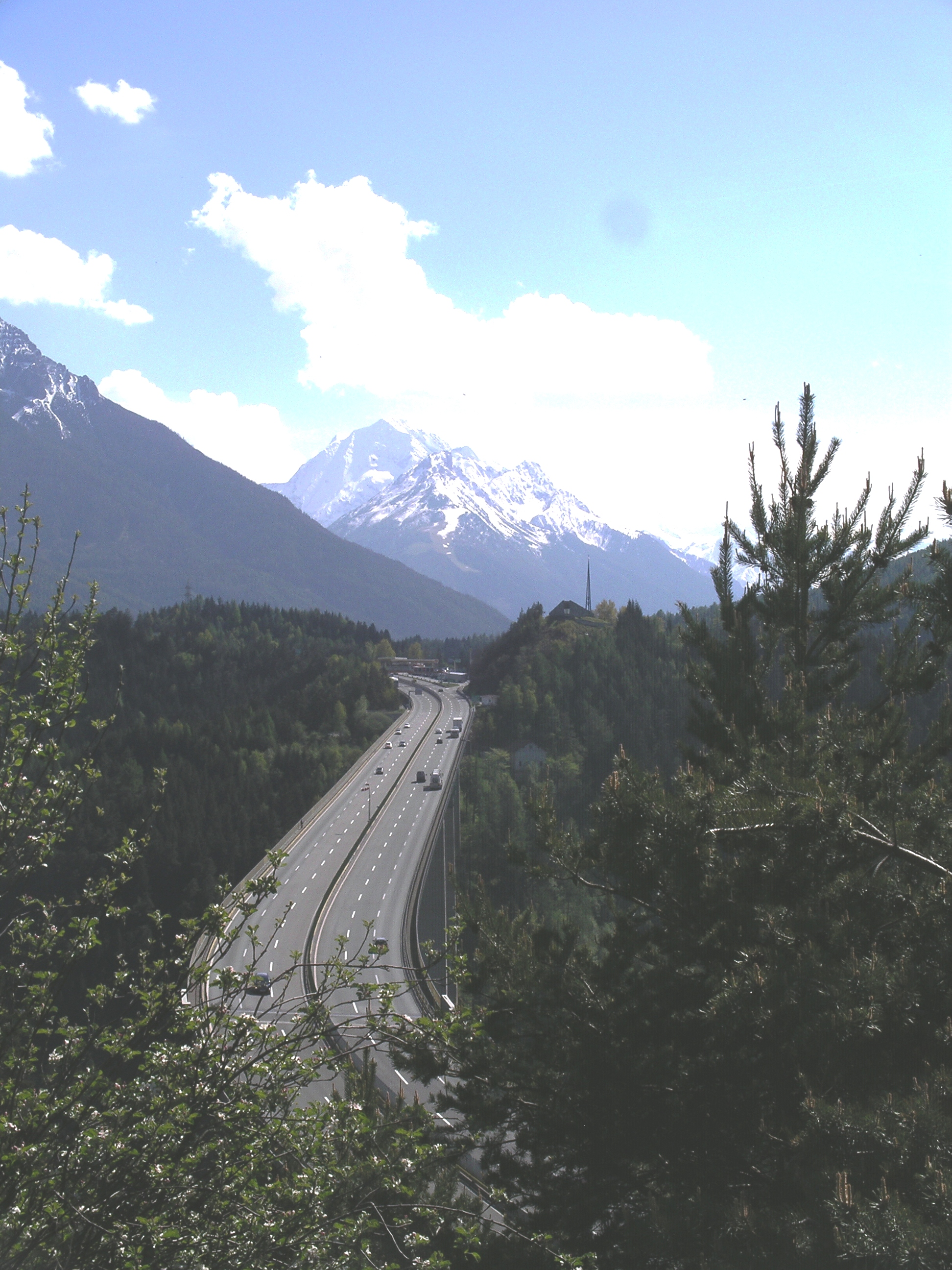
Europe Bridge as a part of the Brenner Autobahn A 13. View to south with the Serles in the background

The Austrian autobahns are controlled-access highways in Austria. They are officially called Bundesstraßen A (Bundesautobahnen) under the authority of the Federal Government according to the Austrian Federal Road Act (Bundesstraßengesetz), not to be confused with the former Bundesstraßen highways maintained by the Austrian states since 2002. The allowed topspeed is 130 km/h for cars up to 3500 kg.

== Network map ==
Interactive map of Autobahns of Austria

== History ==
Autobahn sign

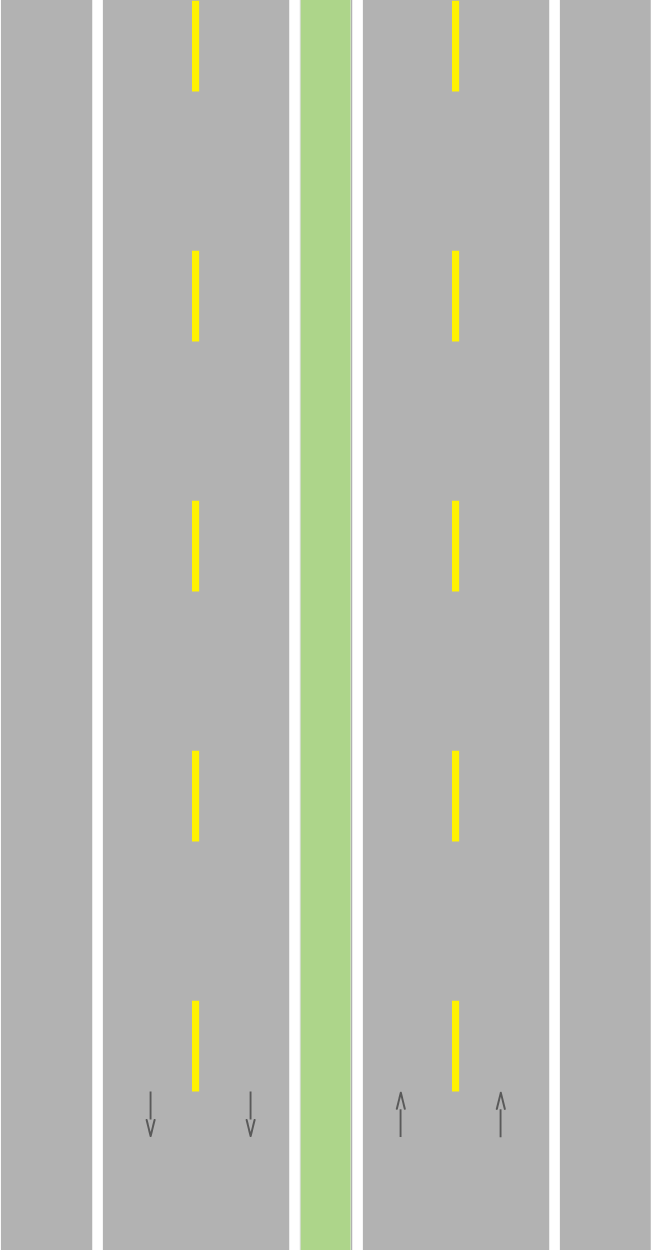
Up to as late as 1995, Austria used yellow road markings (the dashed lines) on its motorways, the emergency lane being designed by a solid white line

Ideas for building a limited-access road network with grade separated interchanges had already been developed in the 1920s, including a "Nibelungen" highway along the Donau (Danube) river from Passau to Wien (Vienna) and further on towards Budapest. Those plans however had never been carried out due to the lasting economic crisis that hit the country after the dissolution of Austria-Hungary in 1918, exacerbated by the Great Depression.

The first autobahn on Austrian territory was the West Autobahn from Salzburg to Vienna. Building started immediately after the Austrian Anschluss in 1938 (the annexation of Austria by order of Adolf Hitler) as an extension of the German Reichsautobahn-Strecke 26 from München (Munich) (the present-day Bundesautobahn 8). However, only 16.8 km (10.4 mi) including the branch-off of the planned Tauern Autobahn had been finished on 13 September 1941. Construction works discontinued the next year due to World War II. After the war delaying resistance by the Soviet occupation forces as well as claims raised by West Germany to the former Reichsautobahn assets obstructed the resumption until 1954.

Construction started in the US-occupied zone of Salzburg and Upper Austria, partly relying on the pre-war planning, and was extended after the country regained full sovereignty under the 1955 Austrian State Treaty. The first section of the West Autobahn up to Mondsee was opened in 1958, and by 1967 the route between Salzburg and Vienna was completed. From 1959 onwards the Süd Autobahn was built to reach the southern state capitals of Graz and Klagenfurt from Vienna. The construction of the Tauern Autobahn was not resumed until 1969. The Inn Valley Autobahn in the western state of Tyrol was built from 1968 onwards, up to today it is not directly connected to the main Austrian autobahn network, as via motorway drivers have to use the German autobahns BAB 8 and 93 along the Deutsches Eck link.

== Autobahn system ==
Austria currently has 18 autobahns, since 1982 built and maintained by the self-financed ASFiNAG stock company in Vienna, which is wholly owned by the Republic of Austria and earns revenue from road user charges and tolls. Each route bears a number as well as an official name with local reference, which, however, is not displayed on road signs. Unusually for European countries, interchanges (between motorways called Knoten, "knots") are numbered by distance in kilometres starting from where the route begins. That arrangement is also used in the Czech Republic, Slovakia, Hungary, Spain and most Canadian provinces (and in most American states, albeit in miles). The current Austrian Autobahn network has a total length of 1,720 km (1,070 mi).

The system is going to be expanded; one autobahn is currently under construction, and one more is planned. The transit traffic across the main chain of the Alps, especially by trucks, has led to a considerable environmental load to the fragile Alpine ecosystem. Several action groups urge the transfer of freight transport from road to rail. In 1991, Austria signed the Alpine Convention on the protection of the natural environment.

Number	Name	Route	Length		Status	Is there an international border, and if so with whom?
Number	Name	Route	(km)	(mi)	Status	Is there an international border, and if so with whom?
A 1	West Autobahn	Vienna Auhof – Sankt Pölten – Linz – Salzburg – Walserberg border crossing (German Bundesautobahn 8)	292	181	Open	Yes, with Germany
A 2	Süd Autobahn	Vienna Inzersdorf interchange (A23) – Wiener Neustadt – Graz – Klagenfurt – Thörl-Maglern border crossing (Italian Autostrada 23)	379	235	Open	Yes, with Italy
A 3	Südost Autobahn	Guntramsdorf interchange (A2) – Eisenstadt interchange (S31)	39	24	open; Eisenstadt – Klingenbach border crossing (Hungarian M85 motorway): planned	
A 4	Ost Autobahn	Vienna Erdberg – Schwechat – Nickelsdorf border crossing (Hungarian M1 motorway)	67	42	Open	
A 5	Nord/Weinviertel Autobahn	Eibesbrunn interchange (S1) – Wolkersdorf – Poysdorf	58	36	Open; Poysdorf – Drasenhofen border crossing (Czech D52 motorway): planned	
A 6	Nordost Autobahn	Bruckneudorf interchange – Kittsee border crossing (Slovakian D4 motorway)	22	14	Open	
A 7	Mühlkreis Autobahn	Linz interchange (A1) – Unterweitersdorf (connection Mühlviertler Schnellstraße (S10) to Czech D3 motorway under construction)	27	17	Open	
A 8	Innkreis Autobahn	Voralpenkreuz interchange (A1, A9) – Wels – Suben border crossing (German Bundesautobahn 3)	76	47	Open	
A 9	Pyhrn Autobahn	Voralpenkreuz interchange (A1, A8) – Graz – Spielfeld border crossing (Slovenian A1 motorway)	230	140	Open; some two-way tunnels	
A 10	Tauern Autobahn	Salzburg interchange (A1) – Villach interchange (A2, A11)	194	121	Open	
A 11	Karawanken Autobahn	Villach interchange (A2, A10) – Karawanken Tunnel border crossing (Slovenian A2 motorway)	22	14	Open; one two-way tunnel	
A 12	Inn Valley Autobahn	Kufstein border crossing (German Bundesautobahn 93) – Innsbruck – Zams (Arlberg Schnellstraße (S16))	153	95	Open	
A 13	Brenner Autobahn	Innsbruck interchange (A12) – Brenner Pass border crossing (Italian Autostrada 22)	34	21	Open	
A 14	Rheintal/Walgau Autobahn	Hörbranz border crossing (German Bundesautobahn 96) – Bregenz – Feldkirch – Bludenz-Montafon (Arlberg Schnellstraße (S16))	61	38	Open	
A 21	Wiener Außenring Autobahn	Steinhäusl interchange (A1) – Alland – Vösendorf interchange (A2, S1)	38	24	Open	
A 22	Donauufer Autobahn	Vienna Kaisermühlen interchange (A23) – Korneuburg – Stockerau interchange (S3, S5)	33	21	Open; Kaisermühlen – Kaiserebersdorf interchange (A4): proposed	
A 23	Südosttangente Wien	Vienna Altmannsdorf – Vienna Hirschstetten	17	11	Open; Hirschstetten – Raasdorf interchange (S1): planned	
A 25	Welser Autobahn	Haid interchange (A1)– Wels interchange (A8)	20	12	Open	No
A 26	Linzer Autobahn	Hummelhof interchange (A7) – Urfahr interchange (A7)	9	5.6	Open; Freinburg Tunnel: planned	No
Total length			1,717	1,067		

A map of the Austrian Autobahn and Schnellstraße system. Blue = Autobahn, Green = Schnellstraße, Dotted = planned or under construction

== Traffic laws and enforcement ==
For Austrian autobahns, a general speed limit of 130 km/h (81 mph) is set, although as of August 25, 2018, the ÖVP-FPÖ coalition government had been going on a trial for a possible speed limit increase to 140 km/h (87 mph) on the Autobahn 1 freeway. The trial ended in 2020 with no changes to speed limit. They may only be used by powered vehicles that are designed to achieve at least 60 km/h (37 mph). While on the motorway voluntary stops, U-turns and backward driving are prohibited.

== Schnellstraßen ==
Autostraße sign

Schnellstraßen (officially Bundesstraßen S) are federal limited-access roads very similar to Autobahnen; the chief difference is that they are more cheaply built with fewer tunnels, mostly just following the given topography. Depending on the road extension, they are either signposted as Autobahn or Autostraße according to Austrian traffic regulations. The speed limit on Schnellstraßen is 100 km/h, however on some it is 130 km/h indicated by a sign. The current Schnellstraßen system has a total length of 466 km (290 mi).

As they fit better with the mountainous topography of Austria, Schnellstraßen often serve as an autobahn substitute. For example, the main link between the Austria's westernmost state of Vorarlberg and adjacent Tyrol is entirely provided by the S16 Arlberg Schnellstraße, including the Arlberg Road Tunnel completed in 1979.

== Tolls ==
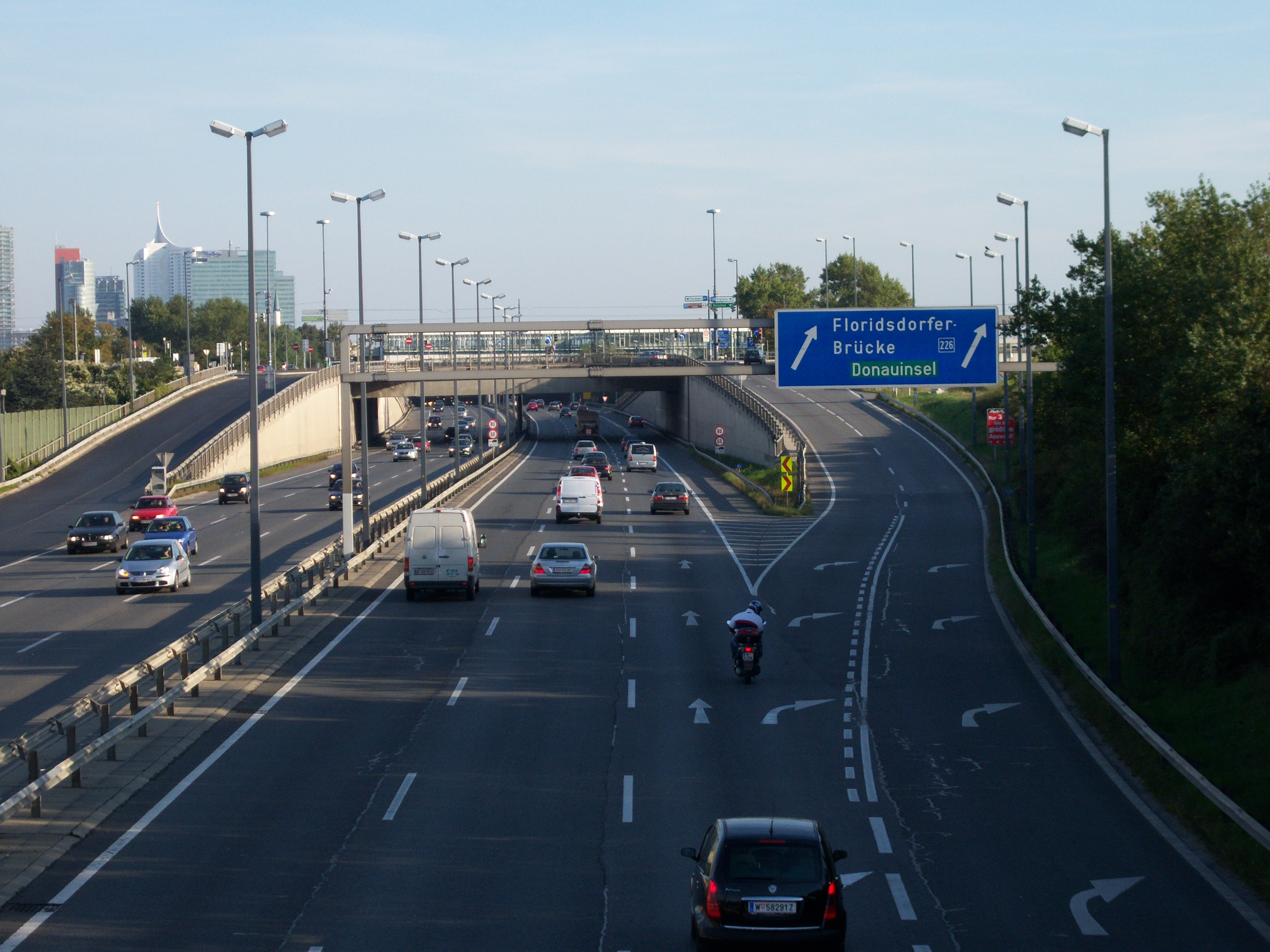
A22 Donauuferautobahn, near the exit Floridsdorfer Brücke

Since 1997, the use of all Autobahnen and Schnellstraßen requires the purchase of a vignette (toll sticker) for passenger cars up to 3.5 tonnes or a GO-Box (electronic toll system) for trucks and buses. The toll fee (Maut) has to be paid to legally access the Austrian Autobahns at any time except the Autobahns listed below. On routes which are more costly to maintain, mostly Alpine routes with tunnels—sections of the Pyhrn Autobahn, the Tauern Autobahn (Tauern Tunnel) and the Karawanken Autobahn (Karawanken Tunnel), as well as the Brenner Autobahn—a toll is collected at time of use via toll plazas and therefore drivers do not need to have a vignette to use these Autobahn sections.

Vignettes (coll. Pickerl) are available in varying lengths of validity (10 days, two months, or a year). As of 2016, a vignette valid for a year costs €85.70 for cars and €34.10 for motorcycles. To prove to have paid this fee, the toll stickers have to be put onto the inside of the front windscreen. Once removed, they no longer are valid, so each car on Austrian Autobahns needs its own toll sticker. From 2018, digital vignettes are an alternative to toll stickers. Digital vignette is purchased on the internet and linked to the vehicle's registration plate.

Since 2004 trucks must carry the GO-Box, a little white box which counts the length of the Autobahn used by way of electrical control points, queried by overhead DSRC microwave radio transceivers at different locations. Overhead 3-D infrared laser scanners are used to detect and photograph trucks travelling without it.

A fine of €110 must be paid if a vehicle is on the motorway without a GO-Box or a vignette, or a fine of €240 if a vignette is not affixed onto the windscreen or in one of the approved places or the vehicle is on the motorway with a vignette that has expired or been tampered with. If the driver refuses to pay the fine, then the fine will increase to between €300 and €3,000.

== See also ==
- Transport in Austria
- List of controlled-access highway systems
- Evolution of motorway construction in European nations
