= Wiener Außenring Autobahn =

Road in Austria

Motorway A21
- Wiener Außenring Autobahn A21
- Vienna Outer Ring Autobahn

Route information
- Part of E60
- Length: 38.2 km (23.7 mi)

Major junctions
- From: A 1 in Altlengbach
- To: A 2, S 1 in Vösendorf

Location
- Country: Austria
- States: Lower Austria, Vienna

Highway system
- Highways of Austria; Autobahns; Expressways; State Roads
← A 14	→ A 22

The Wiener Außenring Autobahn A 21 (also Allander Autobahn) is a motorway in Austria and part of the European route E60. It connects the West Autobahn (A 1) at the Steinhäusl interchange with the Süd Autobahn (A 2) at the Vösendorf interchange, where it continues as the Wiener Außenring Schnellstraße (S 1).

In the future, the Wiener Außenring Autobahn, in conjunction with other expressways and motorways, will form part of the so-called regional ring around Vienna.

== Description ==
The A 21 has six lanes between the Vösendorf interchange and Brunn am Gebirge. The further route to the Steinhäusl interchange is basically four lanes, but in gradient areas there is an additional slow lane.

The two sections of the A 21 at Steinhäusl and Gießhübl, with a maximum grade of 5.2%, are among the steepest sections of the Austrian motorway network. Several times a year, when snow falls in eastern Austria, snow chains have to be made compulsory for trucks, or the highway has to be completely closed to trucks.

== History ==
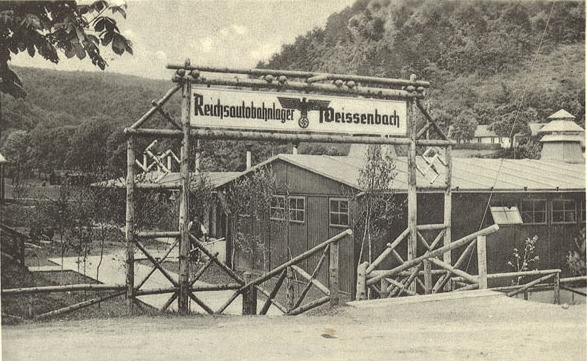
Warehouse at the motorway construction site in Weissenbach bei Mödling

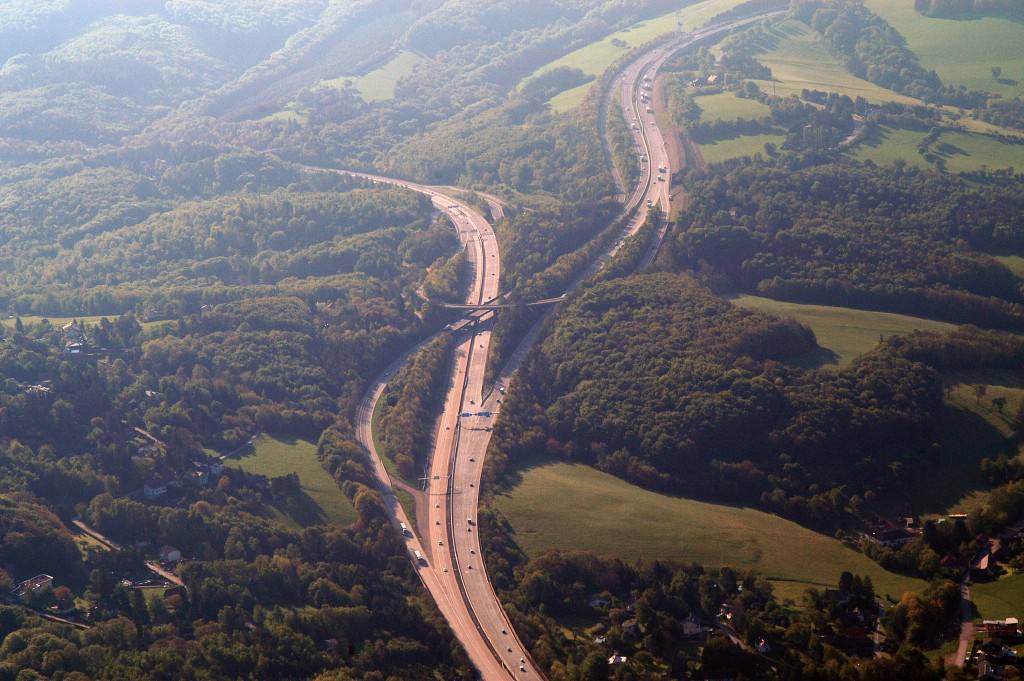
Knoten Steinhäusl

The Wiener Außenring Autobahn was already planned in the 1930s. The construction of the valley crossings had already begun in 1940. Thus, for example, in Weissenbach or Sittendorf barracks were set up, initially housing regular construction workers, but later serving as accommodation for prisoners of war. Thus, in the Sittendorfer camp, originally relatively well-paid workers from Vienna and the Burgenland, but also from Germany, were housed. In September 1941 Ukrainians came to this camp and were trained as soldiers. Later, prisoners from France and later Serbia came to the camp. The camp housed up to 250 inmates. In 1942, typhoid fever broke out and claimed numerous victims. After the barracks briefly served as a warehouse for aircraft parts from the Seegrotte, their usage was stopped in the war turmoil like all other construction sites. Another camp was located on the Fischerwiese in Klausen-Leopoldsdorf, where Roma were also imprisoned, who had to work as forced laborers on the highway. In 1938, a barrack camp was built in Sittendorf, which originally served for the workers and later French prisoners of war, as well as for Serbian forced laborers. Today, a plaque commemorates the place of remembrance in the barracks camp and at the Sittendorf cemetery.

After the war, land already exchanged or replaced fell into Soviet hands as German property and only returned to the Republic of Austria after the State Treaty in 1955.

Other route variants were also considered before the further construction. One variant, for example, was to make the A 21 run more southwards from Alland. However, since the Helenental, a narrow valley, would have been too badly affected, this variant was dropped again. It was only in the area of Heiligenkreuz that the route was moved further away from the village, so as not to affect the Heiligenkreuz Abbey. In addition, a large part of the land necessary for the construction had already been sold; thus, the further construction was not started until 1964.

On the first section opened in 1962 between the Vösendorf interchange and Brunn am Gebirge, only one directional roadway was available. It was only passable in both directions from 1968 onwards. The last sections between Mayerling and Hinterbrühl were completed in 1982. Furthermore, the highway was planned to continue to Schwechat, where it would become the A 4. This section was realized in the form of the S 1 expressway, which opened in 2006.

Soon after the opening of the continuous motorway, a rest area was to be built at the location of today's Hinterbrühl rest stop. After partial resistance from the local population, who feared that their habitat would be adversely affected, the plan was dropped and the rest area was built in Alland instead.

Opening	Section	Length
19.12.1962	ASt Brunn/Gebirge - Knoten Vösendorf (right carriageway)	2.116 km
11.04.1968	ASt Brunn/Gebirge - Knoten Vösendorf (left carriageway)	2.116 km
24.09.1971	Knoten Steinhäusl - Klausen-Leopoldsdorf	13.200 km
07.10.1977	Klausen-Leopoldsdorf - ASt Mayerling	4.017 km
24.10.1980	ASt Hinterbrühl - ASt Brunn/Gebirge	10.442 km
29.09.1982	ASt Heiligenkreuz - ASt Hinterbrühl	3.031 km
29.09.1982	ASt Mayerling - ASt Heiligenkreuz (left carriageway)	5.437 km
29.10.1982	ASt Mayerling - ASt Heiligenkreuz (right carriageway)	5.437 km

== Accidents ==
On the night of 22 February 2010, a German coach bus traveling towards Steinhäusl collided with a truck in front of it. Six people were killed, ten seriously injured, and twenty slightly injured. Temperatures around the freezing point made it difficult to use emergency services on the closed motorway.

== Problems ==
On 2 December 2010, after heavy snowfall, 80 trucks were stuck on the A 21 and the entire highway was closed for five hours. After heavy snowfalls, the A 21 had to be closed on 1 December 2016 at the Steinhäusl interchange, because trucks got stuck there despite having winter equipment. One reason was the gradient of more than 5% there. On 19 April 2017, after heavy snowfall, the A 21 was closed again because several trucks and many cars that were already on summer tires got stuck on the A 21 for hours. The ASFINAG responded to the criticism that they had responded too late to the snowfall by stating that they had sent the snowploughs on the road hours before the onset of the strongest snowfall. Crossed trucks and the failure to form the emergency lane (Rettungsgasse) by drivers would have made it impossible to get through with the snow plows. In a statement issued on 20 April 2017, Infrastructure Minister Leichtfried announced that the winter tires requirement for trucks would be extended until 15 May.

== Bibliography ==
- Bernd Kreuzer: Der Bau der Autobahnen und Schnellstraße in Österreich. – In: ASFINAG (Hrsg.): Das Autobahnnetz in Österreich. 30 Jahre Asfinag. – Vienna, 2012, S. 99
