= Arlberg Schnellstraße =

Expressway in Austria

Expressway S16
- Arlberg Schnellstraße S16
- Arlberg Schnellstraße

Route information
- Part of E60
- Length: 62.2 km (38.6 mi)

Major junctions
- From: A 12 in Zams
- To: A 14 in Bludenz

Location
- Country: Austria
- Regions: Tyrol, Vorarlberg

Highway system
- Highways of Austria; Autobahns; Expressways; State Roads

The Arlberg Schnellstraße (S16) is an expressway (Schnellstraße) in Austria that is part of the E 60. It runs along a length of 62.2 km between Zams and Bludenz and connects the Inn Valley Autobahn (A12) in Tyrol with the Rheintal/Walgau Autobahn (A14) in Vorarlberg. The border between the two states is located in the Arlberg Tunnel (toll), which is 13,972 m long and is also the longest road tunnel in Austria. Overall, more than half of the route runs in long tunnels.

== History ==
After the section from Bludenz to Braz opened from 1969 to 1972, the Arlberg Tunnel, opened in December 1978, was the next completed part. Further construction took place over a number of years. Only in 2006 was the last gap closed with the Strenger Tunnel.

=== Opening timeline ===
| Date | Section | Length (km) |
|---|---|---|
| 17. Nov. 1969 | HASt Braz West – ASt Bludenz-Montafon | 05.288 |
| 1972 | ASt Braz Ost - HASt Braz West | 02.649 |
| 1. Dec. 1978 | ASt St. Anton - ASt Langen (Arlbergtunnel) | 16.053 |
| 16. Dec. 1979 | Danöfen - HASt Dalaas | 07.154 |
| 16. Dec. 1979 | HASt Flirsch - ASt St. Anton | 08.689 |
| 29. Jan. 1983 | Zams - ASt Landeck West | 04.131 |
| 5. July 1984 | ASt Zams - Zams | 00.984 |
| 22. Nov. 1991 | ASt Langen - Danöfen | 04.093 |
| 29. June 1994 | ASt Landeck West - ASt Pians | 03.276 |
| 24. June 1997 | HASt Dalaas - ASt Braz Ost | 03.395 |
| 7. Nov. 2005 | Danöfen – Dalaas (second carriageway) | 04.500 |
| 2. June 2006 | ASt Pians – HASt Flirsch | 06.493 |

== Cross-section of the road ==
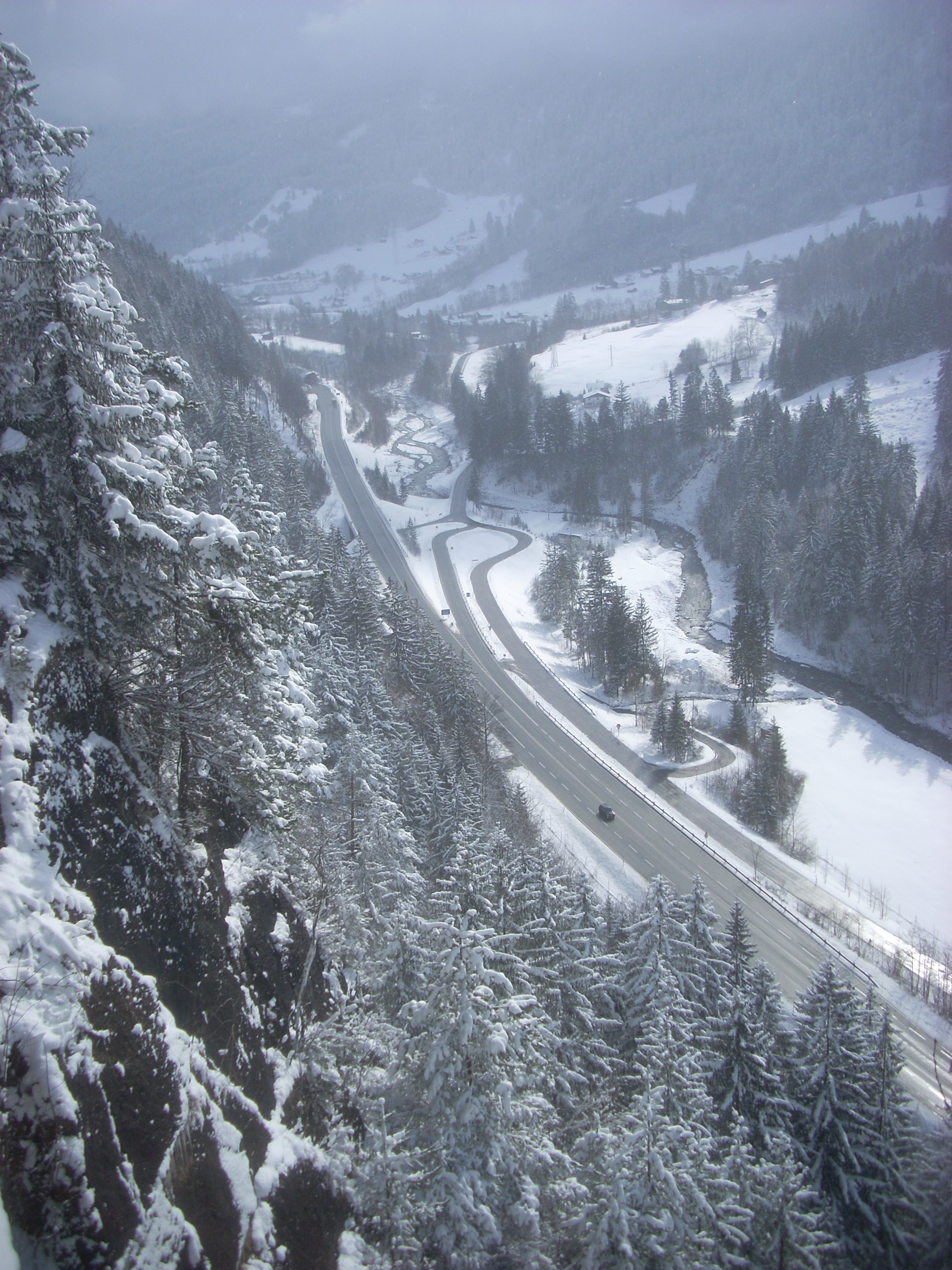
Dalaas exit

In the course of the Arlberg Schnellstraße, the cross-section of the road is often changing. While on the eastern tunnel approach, with the exception of the Tunnel Lötz, the entire route is carried out at least with a 2 + 1 traffic route (three lanes with alternating passing lanes), a large part of the western approach is only two lanes with an overtaking prohibition. However, since the speed limit of 80 km/h and the overtaking prohibition are frequently ignored in this area, serious accidents occur again and again. This makes the S 16 one of the most accident-rich roads in Austria and is therefore often locally referred to as the "death route." The ASFINAG therefore sent a dowser to "suppress" this area, since there are allegedly "earth rays" and "fields of force stones", which would supposedly lead to sudden blood pressure drops and microsleep in drivers. However, the effectiveness of this measure is controversial.

=== Lanes in detail ===
- Zams/A12 – Tunnel Lötz – Perjentunnel/Ostportal: 1+1
- Perjentunnel/Ostportal – Tunnel Pians-Quadratsch – Strenger Tunnel – Flirsch: 2+2
- Flirsch – Tunnel Flirsch-Gondebach – Tunnel Malfonbach/Ostportal: 2+1
- Tunnel Malfonbach/Ostportal – St. Anton: 2+2
- St. Anton – Arlbergtunnel – Langen: 1+1
- Langen – Langener Tunnel – Dalaaser Tunnel/Ostportal: 2+2
- Dalaaser Tunnel: 1+1
- Dalaaser Tunnel/Westportal - Dalaas: 2+1
- Dalaas – parking area Radin: 1+1
- parking area Radin – Bludenz/A14: 2+1

== Expansion projects ==
The route between the Perjentunnel and Zams is to be expanded to four lanes by 2031, so that the eastern approach will only have less than four lanes in the area between Flirsch and Pettneu. A four-lane expansion of the western approach, as planned in the meantime, was canceled due to low traffic load.

Before the completion of individual sections of the Arlberg Schnellstraße, today's Landesstraßen running parallel to the S 16 were designated as Arlberg Ersatzstraße B 316.

== Bibliography ==
- Bernd Kreuzer: Der Bau der Autobahnen und Schnellstraßen in Österreich. In: Das Autobahnnetz in Österreich. 30 Jahre ASFINAG. Wien 2012, S. 11–120. (PDF; 7,6 MB)
- Herbert Gehrer: Der Ausbau der Straßen Vorarlbergs für den motorisierten Verkehr von den 30er Jahren bis 1983. Amt der Vorarlberger Landesregierung, Bregenz 1986.
