= Süd Autobahn =

Motorway in Austria

Motorway A2
- Süd Autobahn A2

Route information
- Part of E59 / E66
- Maintained by ASFiNAG
- Length: 377.3 km (234.4 mi)

Major junctions
- From: A 23
- A 21 near Vienna S4 and S6 near Wiener Neustadt; A 9 near Graz A 10 / A 11 near Villach
- To: A 23 border with Italy

Location
- Country: Austria
- Regions: Vienna, Lower Austria, Burgenland, Styria, Carinthia
- Major cities: Vienna, Graz, Klagenfurt, Villach

Highway system
- Highways of Austria; Autobahns; Expressways; State Roads
← A 1	→ A 3

The Süd Autobahn (A2) ('South Motorway') is a motorway (Autobahn) in Austria. Completed in 1999, it runs from the outskirts of Vienna south via the cities of Graz and Klagenfurt to the border of Italy at Arnoldstein, where it joins the Autostrada A23. With a total length of 377.3 km (234.4 mi), the A2 is Austria's longest motorway.

== History ==
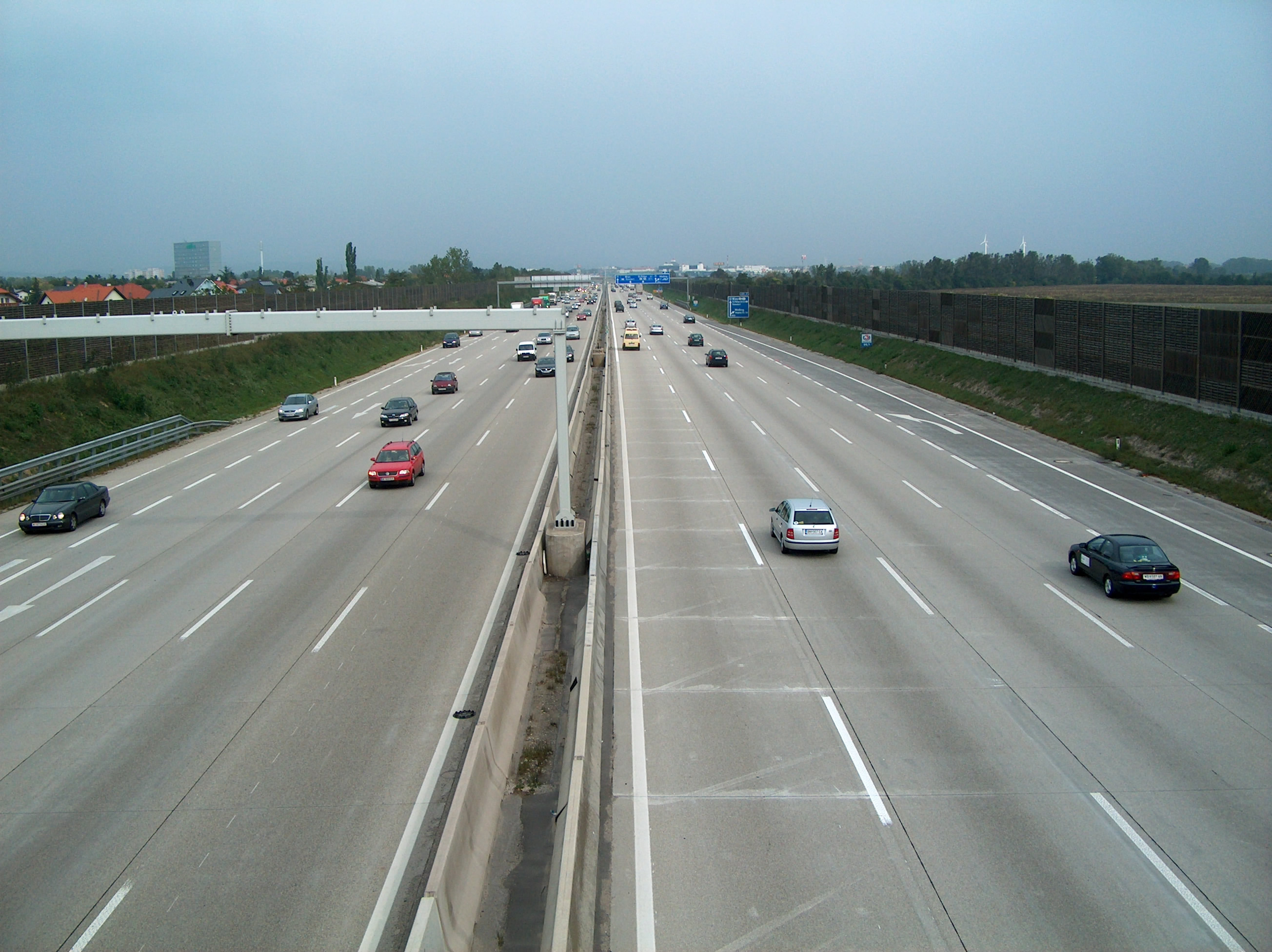
A2 between Wiener Neudorf and Mödling

Plans for the A2 originated from the so-called Reichsautobahn system laid out after the Anschluss annexation of Austria by Nazi Germany in 1938. However, construction had not begun by the outbreak of World War II which terminated all road building projects.

With the first cut of the spade on 6 May 1959, road works were inaugurated on a first section between Vösendorf south of Vienna and Leobersdorf, the segment was opened to the traffic on 26 May 1962. By 1975, the motorway was completed up to Seebenstein in Lower Austria, notably with three lines in each direction. A first segment in Styria between Gleisdorf and Raaba was already opened in 1969, followed by the section between Pörtschach and Villach (then called Wörthersee Autobahn) in Carinthia in 1970. The route was completed with the inauguration of the last segment running from Völkermarkt to Klagenfurt on 25 November 1999.
