= Nord Autobahn =

Motorway in Austria

Motorway A5
- Nord Autobahn A5

Route information
- Part of E461
- Length: 48.5 km (30.1 mi) 57.5 km (35.7 mi) planned

Major junctions
- From: Vienna
- To: Poysdorf

Location
- Country: Austria
- Regions: Vienna, Lower Austria
- Major cities: Vienna

Highway system
- Highways of Austria; Autobahns; Expressways; State Roads
← A 4	→ A 6

The Nord Autobahn (A5) is a motorway, or Autobahn, in Lower Austria and part of European route E461. The first stage, which opened to traffic 31 January 2010, starts from a junction with the Vienna Outer Ring Expressway (S1) at Großebersdorf and goes through the wine quarter to Schrick, where it becomes the highway B7.

An extension of the A5 from Schrick to Poysbrunn was completed in December 2017. The traffic release took place on 8 December 2017. At a later stage, it is planned to extend the A5 all the way to the Czech border, where it will continue as the Czech D52, forming a continuous motorway link between Vienna and Brno.

The traffic control station near Schrick opened in the fall of 2018 and is equipped with specially developed HHB01 and HHB02 truck scales (in addition to the latest technical inspection systems) that capture weight while the vehicle drives across them.

ASFINAG and Lower Austria State jointly invested six million euro to finance a state of the art "truck checker".
