= Karawanken Autobahn =

Motorway A11
- Karawanken Autobahn A11

Route information
- Part of E61
- Length: 21.2 km (13.2 mi)

Major junctions
- From: A 2, A 10 near Villach
- To: A2 on Slovene border

Location
- Country: Austria
- Regions: Carinthia
- Major cities: Villach

Highway system
- Highways of Austria; Autobahns; Expressways; State Roads
← A 10	→ A 12

The Karawanken Autobahn (A 11) is an autobahn (motorway) in Austria. It runs about 21 km (13 mi) from the Villach junction with the Süd Autobahn (A2) and the Tauern Autobahn (A10) southwards to the Slovenian border, where it connects the A2 motorway leading to Ljubljana. It is part of the European route E61 from Villach to Rijeka.

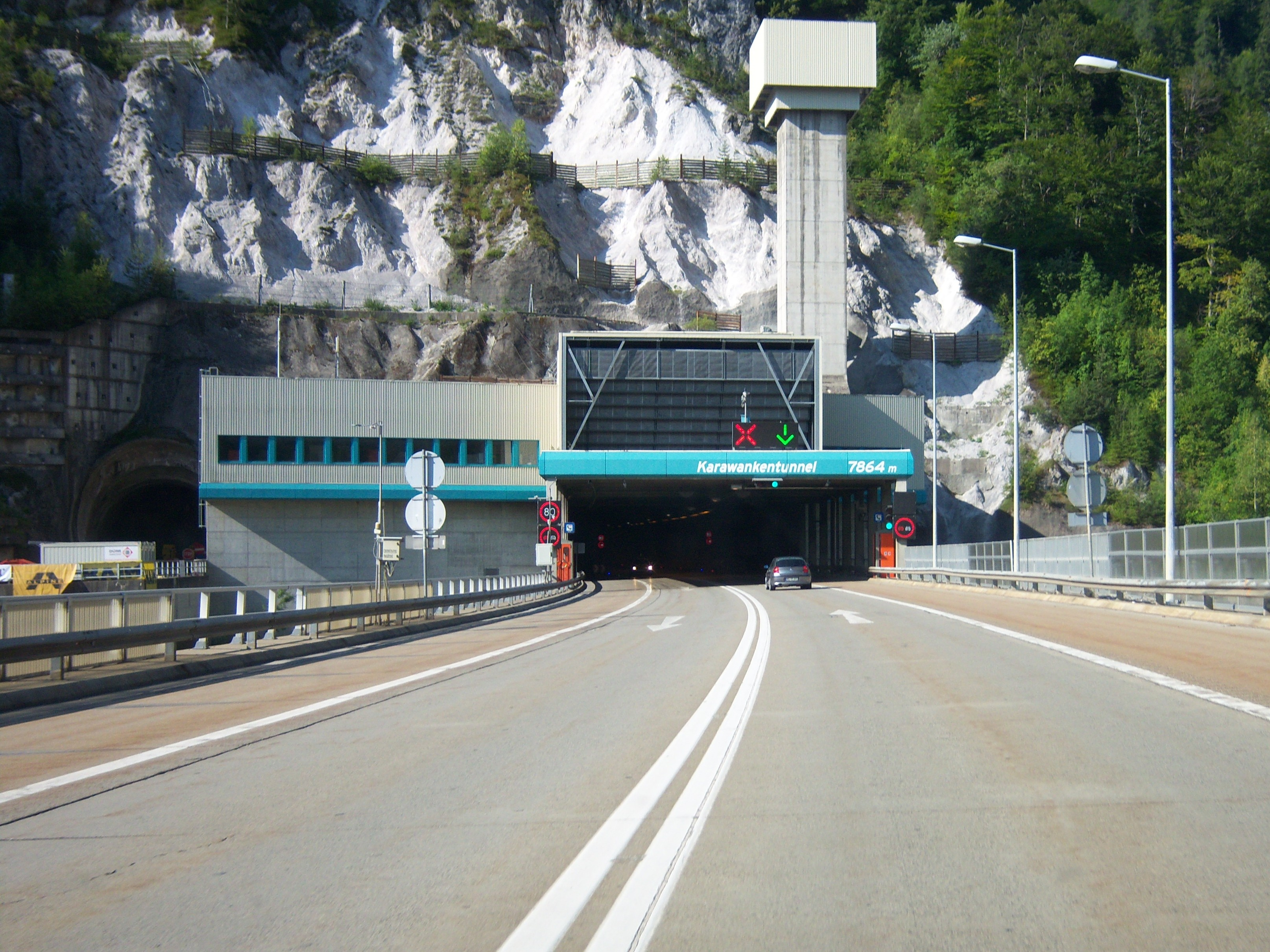
Karawanks Tunnel, northern entrance

The A11 is named after the Karawank mountain range, which forms the Austrian–Slovenian border, crossed by the 7,864 m (25,801 ft) long Karawanks Tunnel opened in 1991.
