= Rheintal/Walgau Autobahn =

Motorway in Austria

Motorway A14
- Rheintal/Walgau Autobahn A14

Route information
- Part of E43 E60
- Length: 61 km (38 mi)

Major junctions
- From: A 96
- To: S 16 in Bludenz

Location
- Country: Austria
- States: Vorarlberg
- Major cities: Bregenz, Dornbirn, Bludenz

Highway system
- Highways of Austria; Autobahns; Expressways; State Roads
← A 13	→ A 21

The Rheintal/Walgau Autobahn (A14) is a motorway in the Austrian state of Vorarlberg.

It begins directly after the German Bundesautobahn 96 at the German-Austrian border near Hörbranz, passes through the Pfändertunnel past Bregenz into the Rhine Valley, through the Ambergtunnel past Feldkirch into the Walgau and ends at Bludenz, becoming the Arlberg Schnellstraße (S16).

Until 2006, the official name of the A14 was only Rheintal Autobahn. In Vorarlberg, the name Rheintal Autobahn was only used for the part of the A14 in the Rhine Valley (i.e. the route Hörbranz-Feldkirch), while the part located in the Walgau (Feldkirch-Bludenz) was unofficially referred to as the Walgau Autobahn.

== History ==
=== Prehistory and plans ===
Already in the mid-1930s, traffic planners recognized that the rapidly increasing motorized traffic would be too much for existing roads. A first study was commissioned before the Nazi era and had the title HaFraBa (motorway Hanseatic cities-Frankfurt-Basel).

After the annexation of Austria to the German Reich in 1939, another highway study was commissioned, which provided for a connection from Wangen im Allgäu to Feldkirch. It would only connect to the cities of Lindau, Bregenz, Dornbirn and Feldkirch. An alpine road would lead via the Pfänder to Scheidegg to the Queralpenstraße. These plans, however, were thrown out with the beginning of the war in 1939.

In occupied post-war Austria, motorization had reached its lowest level. Only in 1952 Baurat Netzer developed a study that envisaged the expansion of the Bundesstraße 1 with bypasses. An overload of the highways could only be divined in the local thoroughfares. The first large-scale traffic census in 1955 and a traffic forecast based on it showed that even in Vorarlberg, an extension of the Bundesstraße alone would not have the desired effect. A memorandum from 1956 mentions a motorway from Unterhochsteg to Feldkirch and from Lauterach to the Swiss border. The planning for these was started immediately, as there was a need, especially in the area of Bregenz.

=== Final planning and construction ===
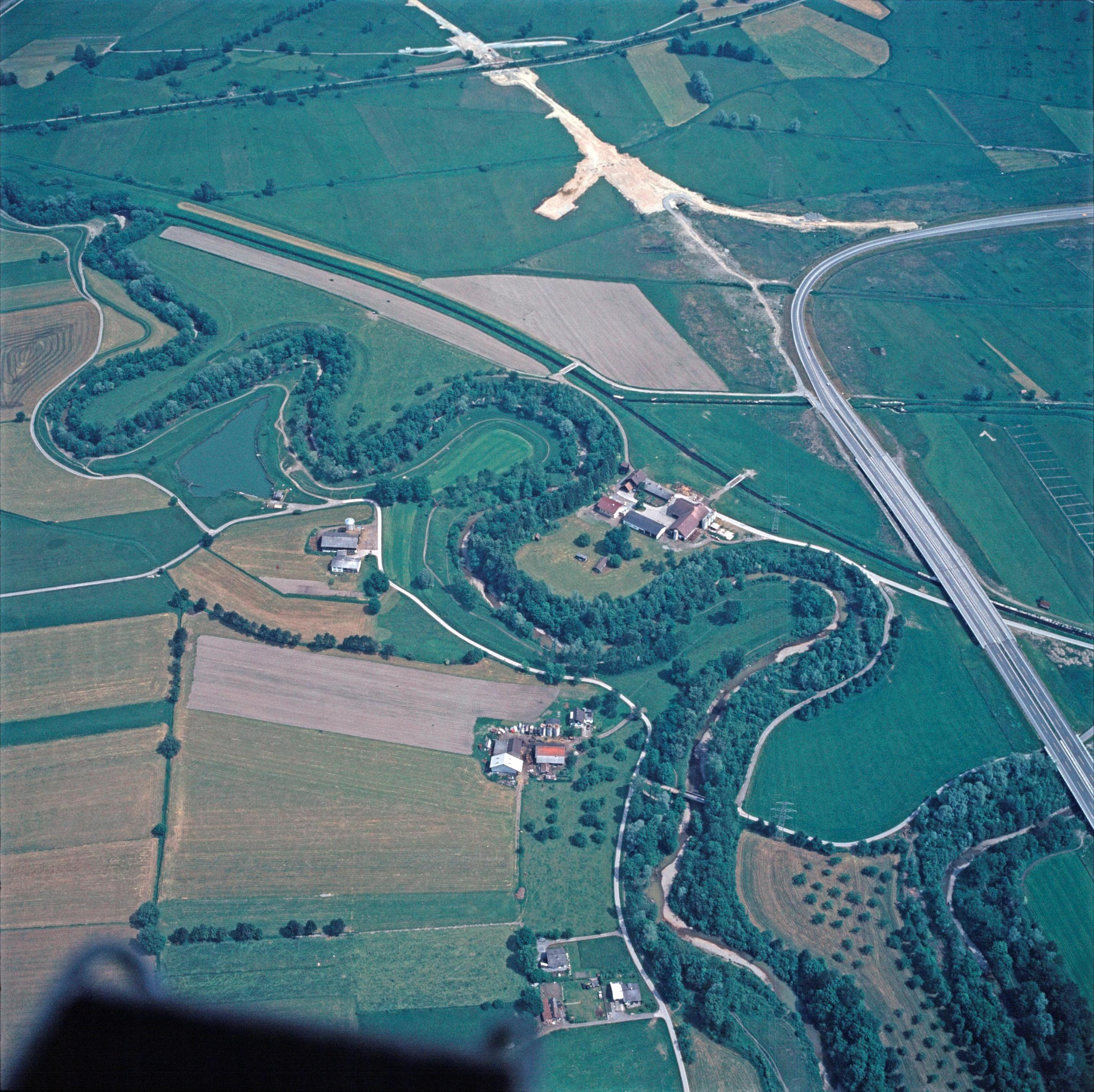
Aerial view of the Dornbirn-Nord junction in 1977, where the highway ended at this time

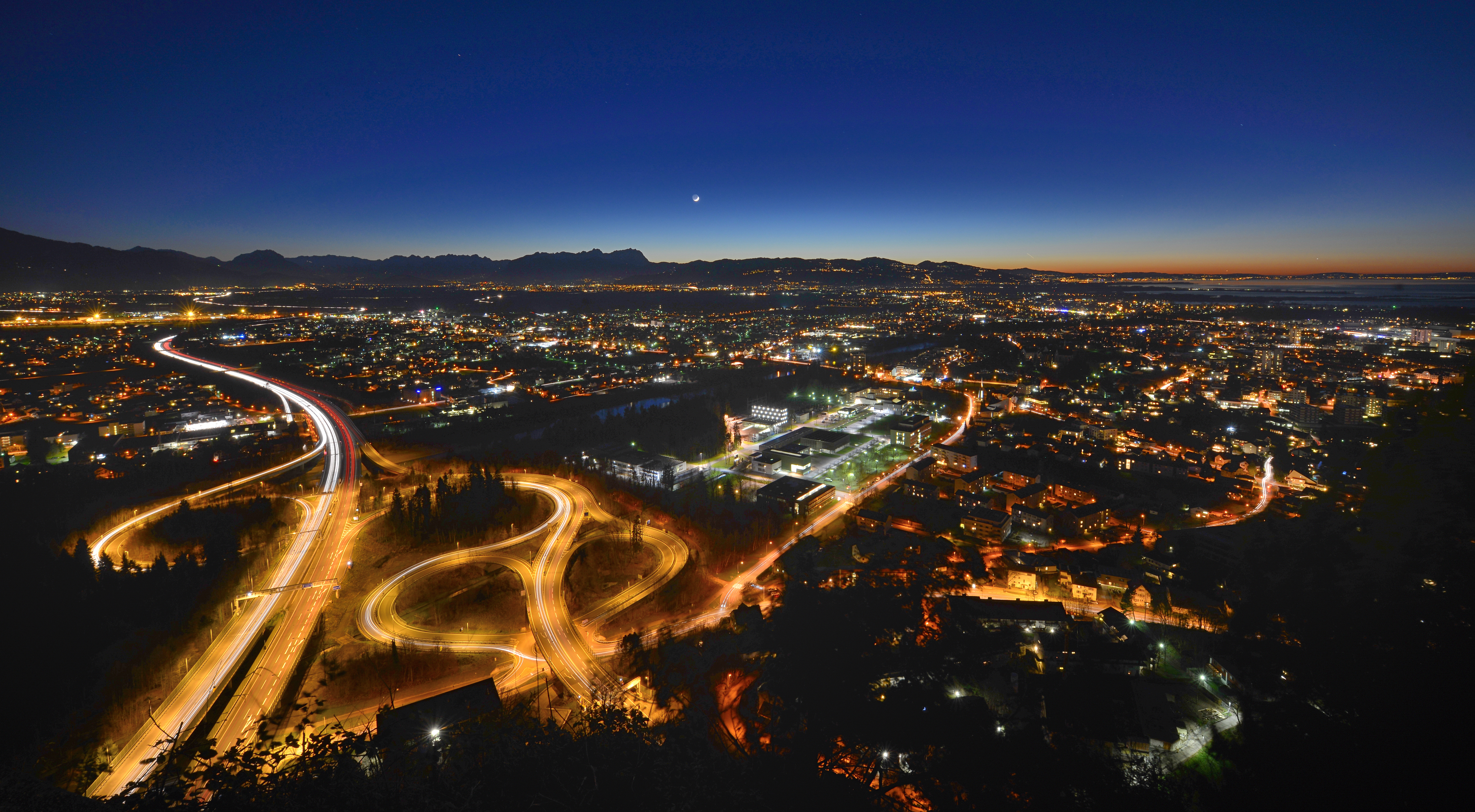
A14 Rheintalautobahn seen from Gebhardsberg

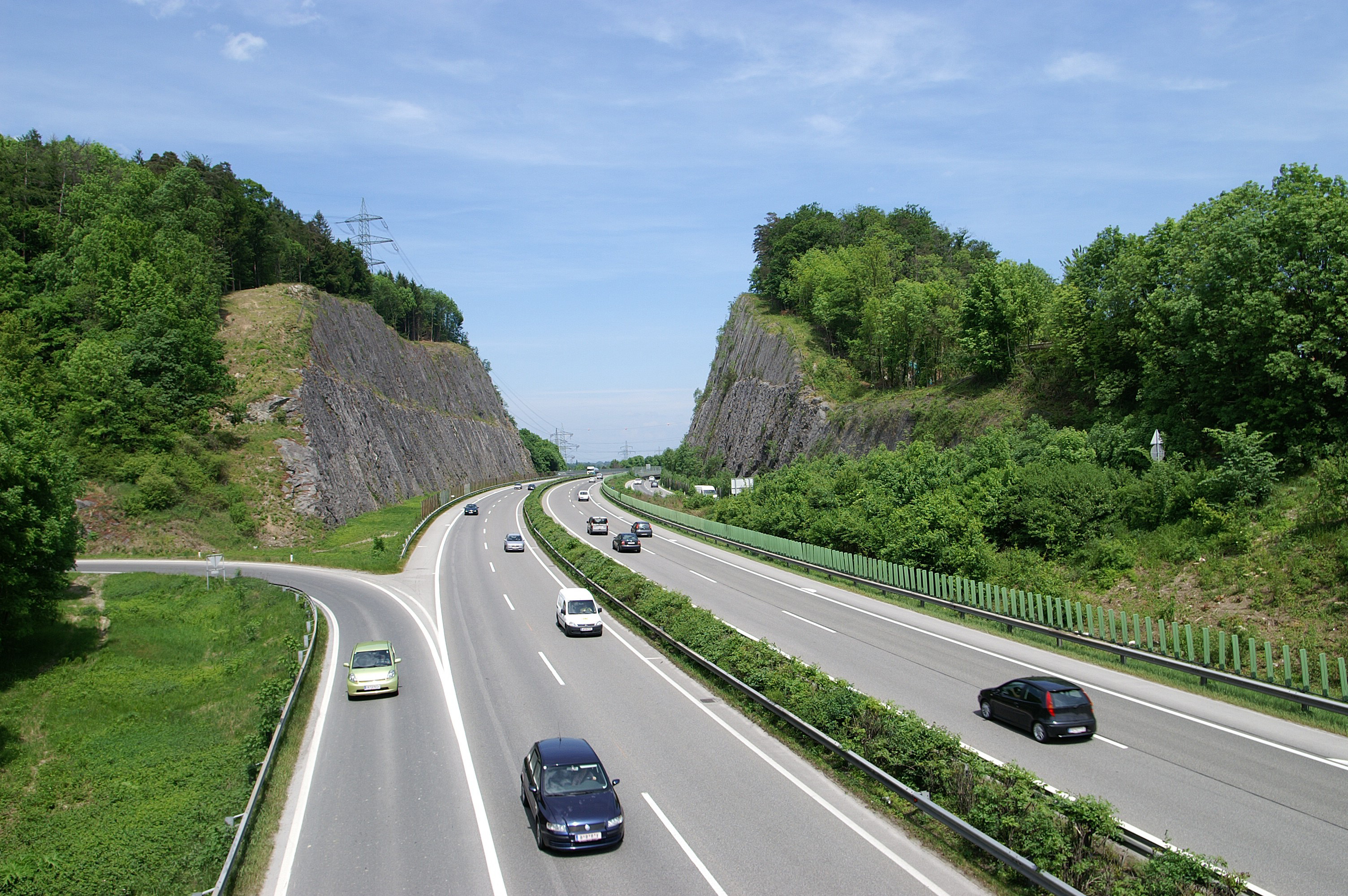
Characteristic crossing of the Udelberg at Götzis

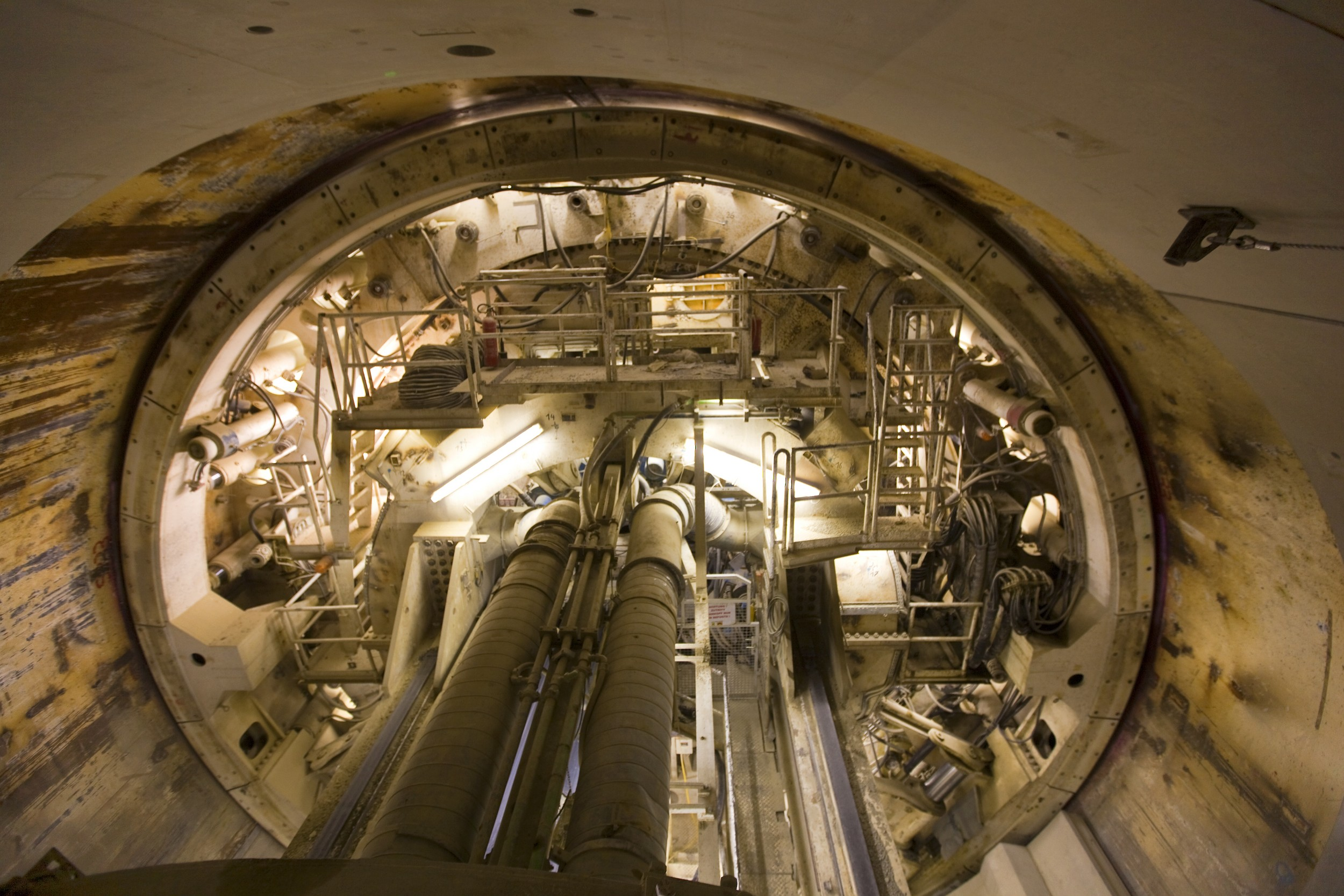
Tunneling machine during the construction of the second Pfändertunnel tube

On October 29, 1965, ground was broken for the construction of the first section of the Rheintal Autobahn from Dornbirn Nord to Götzis Straßenhäuser. The rock material extracted from the Udelberg puncture was mainly used for this construction phase. The geological subsurface of this construction phase, in particular at Dornbirn-Nord, is unstable to this day and requires frequent adjustments and improvements. This motorway section was opened for traffic on 17 December 1971.

Only in 1973, after several years of preparation and uncertainty, did the planning of the Pfändertunnel begin as another important part of the new motorway. Already a year later, the directional tunnel was tendered, and breakthrough occurred on 4 December 1975. The full excavation of the tunnel began in the autumn of 1976. At the same time, access roads were built from the Austria-Germany border and to the Dornbirn-Nord junction. On December 10, 1980, the new tunnel was officially opened, but still without a connection to the city of Bregenz at this time. In the following years, the expansion of this highway to Feldkirch was sped up. The Ambergtunnel to Frastanz was opened on 16 July 1985, which opened the way to the Walgau. In the meantime, the motorway section in the Walgau had already been opened on June 5, 1981, which was now connected to the section in the Rhine Valley. With the Arlbergschnellstraße (S 16) there was thus a direct road connection from the German border near Hörbranz to the neighboring state of Tyrol, but only two lanes with oncoming traffic in the area of the two large tunnels.

=== Adaptation to traffic conditions ===
As a result of the massive increase in traffic in the 1980s and 1990s, plans for the second tube of the Amberg Tunnel began before the turn of the millennium. In December 2003, it was opened to traffic. Finally, in the summer of 2004, the original tube, which had been in existence since 1985, was completely refurbished and adapted for one-way operation.

The plans for a second Pfändertunnel tube could only begin with a change in the transport concept of Vorarlberg in 2001. Up to this time, it was planned to prevent the expansion in order to maintain the gatekeeper effect on the traffic. However, since this gatekeeping effect did not occur and the traffic load in the secondary road network was increasingly higher due to congestion avoidance traffic in Bregenz and the surrounding area, this concept was finally changed and the planning started. Construction of the second tube began in April 2006 and was completed in June 2012, after which the old tube was completely renovated. The full operation of both tubes in directional traffic began on 3 July 2013.

The reason for the construction of a junction "Rheintal Mitte" in Dornbirn was to cater for the greatly expanded industrial / lorry traffic flowing through some critical town junctions. In the area of the underpass of the L 45 Schmitternstraße/Schweizerstrasse under the Rheintal/Walgau Autobahn, a new motorway junction was completed in 2022, which, in connection with the expansion of the L 45, now connects the industrial areas in the south of Dornbirn to the motorway. This involved changing the names of the junctions. Dornbirn Süd was renamed Dornbirn West, and the new junction Rheintal Mitte was renamed to Dornbirn Süd. By doing this the administration took a bold step to align with actual geography. Temporarily, all guide books telling drivers to leave the motorway at Dornbirn Süd, were wrong. The name Dornbirn Süd had moved to the new junction.

The Wolfurt-Lauterach half-interchange is to be expanded, with the conversion of the Wolfurt freight yard, to a full interchange, in order to counteract the steadily growing truck traffic of the municipalities of Lauterach and Wolfurt.
