= Brenner Pass =

Mountain pass through the Alps; border between Italy and Austria

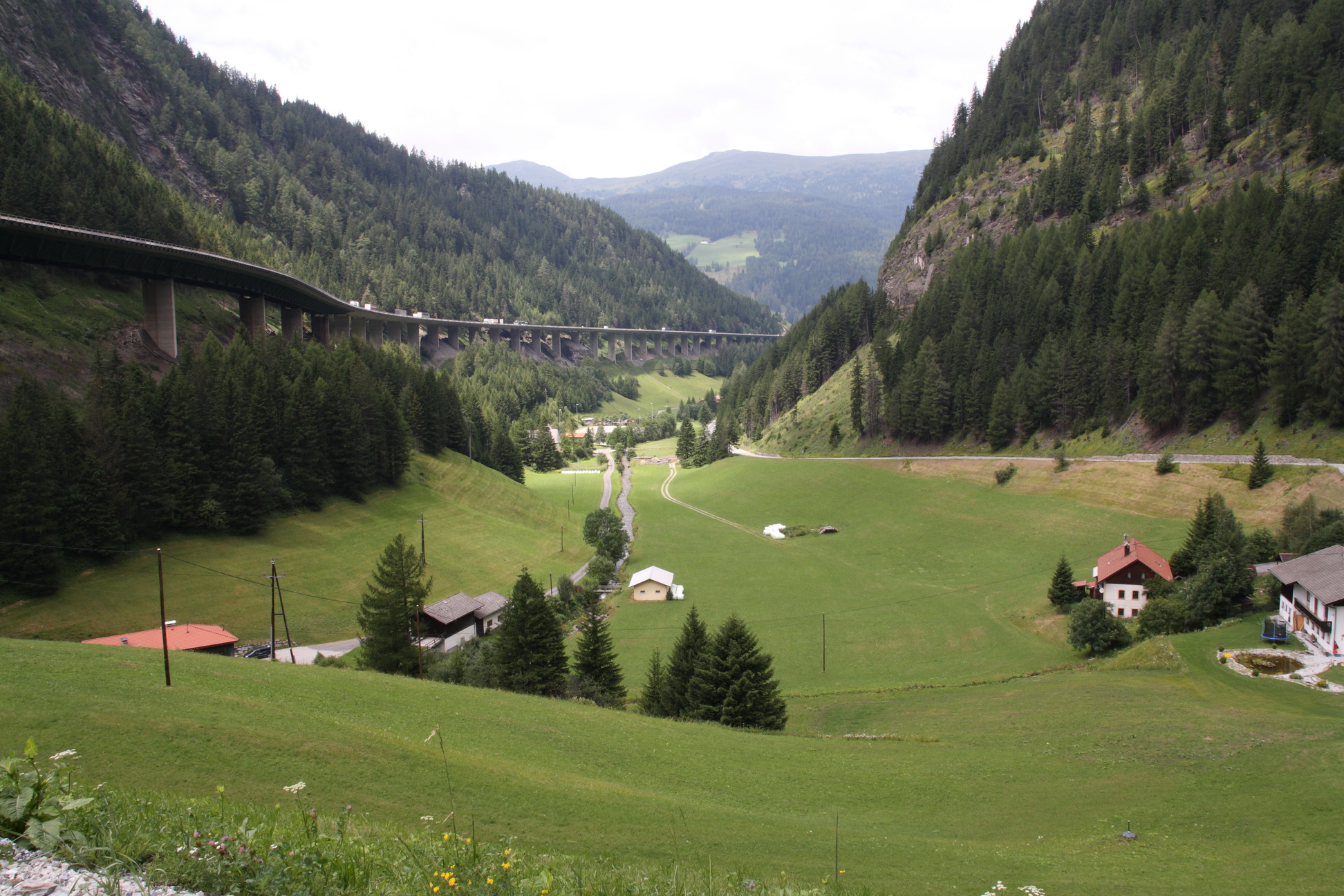
- View between the top of the pass and the village of Gries am Brenner

- Location within Alps
- Elevation: 1,370 metres (4,490 ft)
- Traversed by: E45 motorway

Third Approach
- Location: Austria–Italy border
- Range: Alps
- Coordinates: 47°0′12″N 11°30′27″E

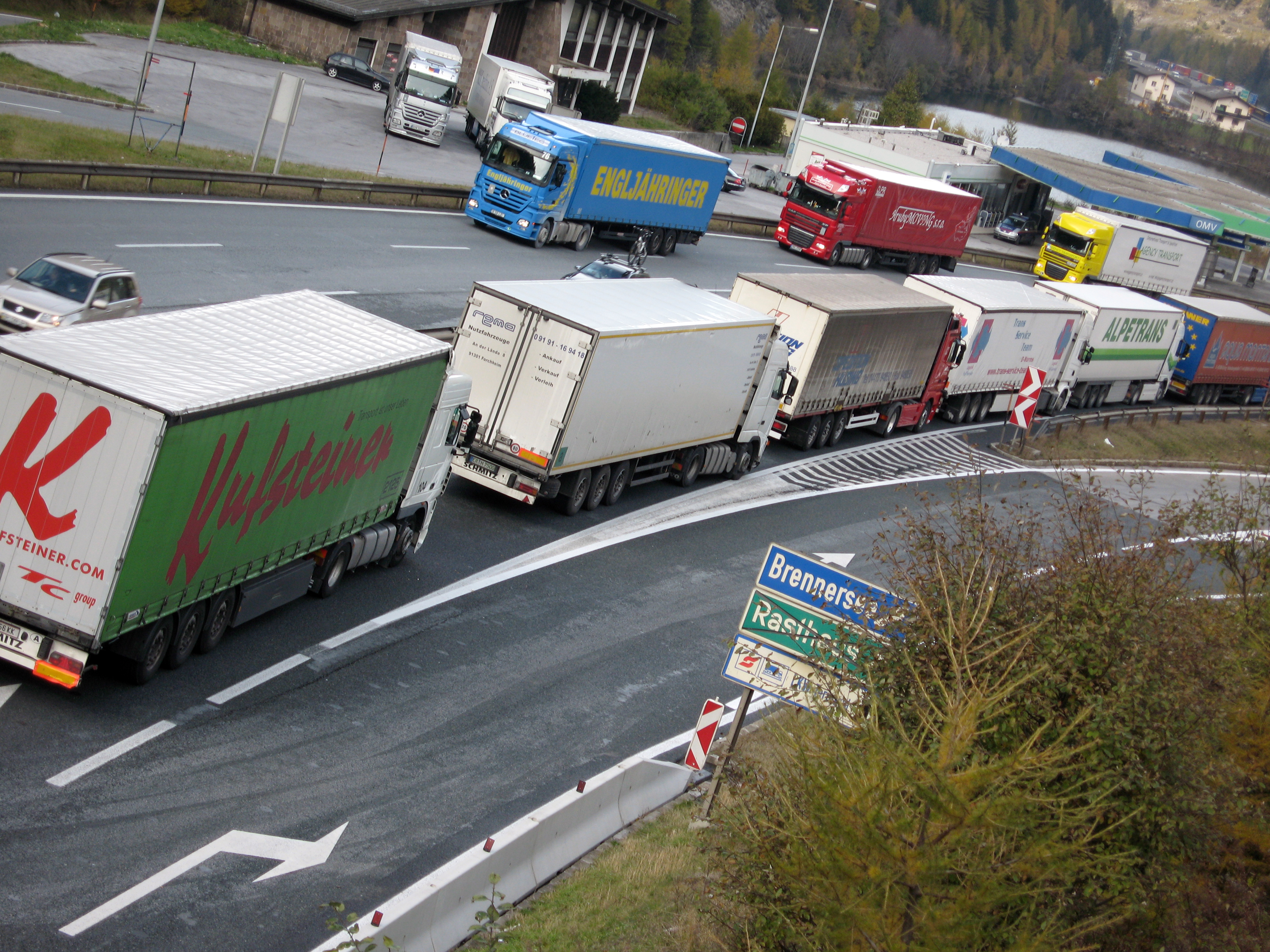
The Brenner Pass carries a four-lane motorway, one of the most important transit routes between Northern and Southern Europe

The Brenner Pass (German: Brennerpass [ˈbʁɛnɐpas], in short Brenner; Italian: Passo del Brennero [ˈpasso del ˈbrɛnnero]) is a mountain pass over the Alps which forms the border between Italy and Austria. It is one of the major passes of the Eastern Alpine range and has the lowest altitude among Alpine passes of the area.

The central section of the Brenner Pass covers a four-lane highway and a railway corridor connecting Bozen/Bolzano to the south and Innsbruck to the north. The village of Brenner consists of an outlet shopping mall (supermarkets and stores), fruit stores, restaurants, cafés, hotels and a gas station. It has a population of 400 to 600 (as of 2011).

== Etymology ==
Older, obsolete theories suggested a connection of the name Brenner with the ancient tribe of the Breuni or the Gaulish chieftain Brennus, but since the pass name appears for the first time only in the 14th century, a more recent etymology is far more likely.

"Prenner" was originally the name of a nearby farm, which was named after its former owner. The farm of a certain Prennerius is mentioned in documents in 1288; a certain Chunradus Prenner de Mittenwalde is mentioned in 1299. The German word Prenner probably refers to somebody who uses slash-and-burn techniques for land clearing. A name for the pass itself appears for the first time in 1328 as ob dem Prenner (German for above the Prenner).

== History ==
=== Roman Empire ===
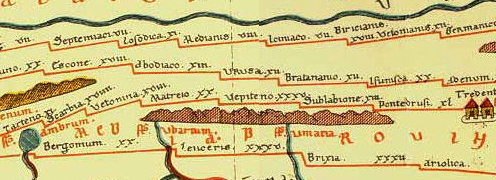
Brenner and the surrounding Roman road network shown in the Tabula Peutingeriana. Brenner is between Matreio and Vepiteno.

The Romans regularised the mountain pass at Brenner, which had already been under frequent use during the prehistoric eras since the most recent Ice Age. The Brenner Pass, however, was not the first trans-Alpine Roman road to become regularised under the Roman Empire.

The first Roman road to cross the Alpine range, Via Claudia Augusta, connected Verona in northern Italy with Augusta Vindelicorum (modern-day Augsburg) in the Roman province of Raetia. Via Augusta was completed in 46–47 AD; the route took its course along the Adige valley to the neighbouring Reschen Pass (west of the Brenner Pass), then descended into the Inn valley before rising to Fern Pass towards Augsburg.

The Roman road that physically crossed over the Brenner Pass did not exist until the 2nd century AD. It took part of the "eastern" route up the Eisack Valley and descended into Veldidena (modern-day Wilten), where it crossed the Inn and into Zirl and arrived at Augsburg via Füssen.

The Alamanni (Germanic tribe) crossed the Brenner Pass southward into modern-day Italy in 268 AD, but they were stopped in November of that year at the Battle of Lake Benacus. The Romans kept control over the mountain pass until the end of their empire in the 5th century.

=== Holy Roman Empire ===
During the High Middle Ages, Brenner Pass was a part of the important Via Imperii, an imperial road linking the Kingdom of Germany north of the Alps with the Italian March of Verona. In the Carolingian Divisio Regnorum of 806, the Brenner region was called per alpes Noricas, the transit through the Noric Alps. From the 12th century, the Brenner Pass was controlled by the Counts of Tyrol within the Holy Roman Empire. Emperor Frederick Barbarossa made frequent use of the Brenner Pass to cross the Alps during his imperial expeditions into Italy. The 12th-century Brenner Pass accommodated mule trains and carts.

Modernisation of the Brenner Pass started in 1777, when a carriage road was laid out at the behest of Empress Maria Theresa.

=== Austrian Empire ===
Modernisation further took place under the Austrian Empire and the Brenner Railway, which was completed in stages from 1853 to 1867. It became the first trans-Alpine railway without a major tunnel and at high altitude (crossing the Brenner Pass at 1,371 m). Completion of the railway enabled the Austrians to move their troops more efficiently; they had hoped to secure their territories of Venetia and Lombardy (south of the Alps), but lost them to Italy following the Second Italian War of Independence in 1859 and Austro-Prussian War in 1866.

=== Recent history ===
At the end of World War I in 1918, the control of the Brenner Pass became shared between Italy and Austria under the Treaty of Saint-Germain-en-Laye (1919). The Treaty of London (1915) secretly awarded Italy the territories south of the Brenner Pass for supporting the Entente Powers. Welschtirol/Trentino, along with the southern part of the County of Tyrol (now South Tyrol), was transferred to Italy, and Italian troops occupied Tyrol and arrived at the Brenner Pass in 1919 to 20.

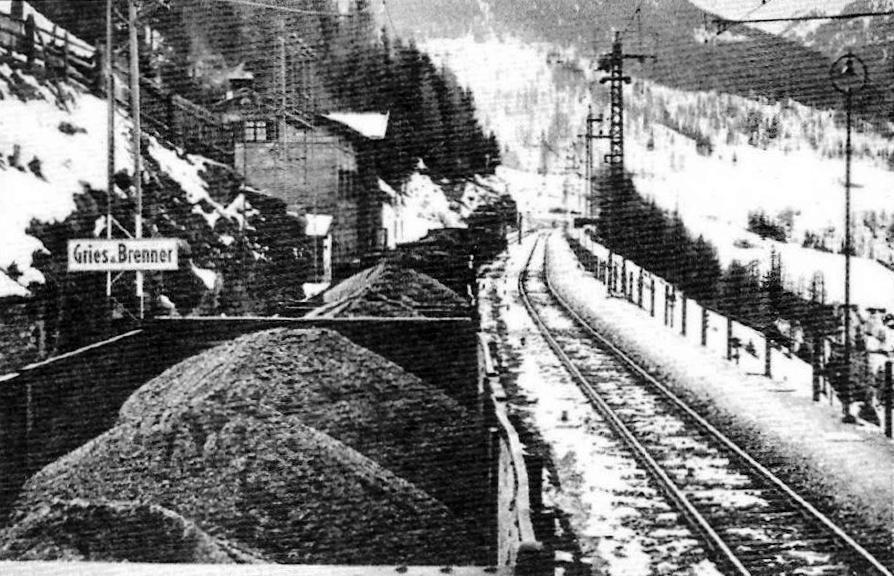
German coal entering Italy through the Brenner Pass in the 1930s

On 12 March 1938, Austria was annexed by Germany. Two years and six days later during World War II, Adolf Hitler and Benito Mussolini met at the Brenner Pass to celebrate their Pact of Steel on 18 March 1940. Later, in 1943, following the Italian armistice with the Allies, the Brenner Pass was annexed by Nazi Germany, shifting the border with the Italian Social Republic, the Nazi puppet state headed by Mussolini, much further south. In 1945, the area was occupied by the US Army and returned to Italy after the end of the war. The Brenner Pass was part of the ratlines that were used by senior Nazis fleeing the allies after the German surrender in 1945.

Following World War II, the pass once again formed the border between Italy and the newly independent Republic of Austria, and maintained its importance as a key trade route. On 1 January 1995 the Schengen Agreement entered into force in Austria, a treaty Italy ratified on 26 October. As a consequence, border checks were abolished in the Brenner Pass for goods and people between the two countries. On 19 November 1995 the border barrier between Italy and Austria at Brenner was officially abolished, with a commemoration attended by Austrian Minister of the Interior Karl Schlögl, Italian Minister of the Interior Giorgio Napolitano, and the governors of Innsbruck and Bolzano.

Brenner Pass

Climate chart (precipitation, max. and min. temperature)
J	F	M	A	M	J	J	A	S	O	N	D
37 0 −7	31 1 −6	47 4 −4	69 7 −1	98 13 4	138 16 6	137 19 9	124 19 9	102 15 6	81 10 2	67 3 −3	47 0 −6
- █ Average max. and min. temperatures in °C
- █ Precipitation totals in mm
- Source: ZAMG
Imperial conversion
J	F	M	A	M	J	J	A	S	O	N	D
1.5 32 19	1.2 34 21	1.9 39 25	2.7 45 30	3.9 55 39	5.4 61 43	5.4 66 48	4.9 66 48	4 59 43	3.2 50 36	2.6 37 27	1.9 32 21
- █ Average max. and min. temperatures in °F
- █ Precipitation totals in inches

== Motorway ==
The motorway E45 (European designation; in Italy A22, in Austria the A13), Brenner Autobahn/Autostrada del Brennero, begins in Innsbruck, runs through the Brenner Pass, Bozen/Bolzano, Verona and finishes outside Modena. It is one of the most important routes of north–south connections in Europe.

After the signing of the Schengen Agreement in 1992 and Austria's subsequent entry into the European Union in 1995, customs and immigration posts at the Brenner Pass were removed in 1997. However, Austria reinstituted border checks in 2015 as a response to the European migrant crisis. In April 2016, Austria announced it would build a 370-meter long fence at the Pass but clarify that "it would be used only to "channel" people and was not a barrier."

The Europabrücke (Europe Bridge), located roughly halfway between Innsbruck and the Brenner Pass, is a large concrete bridge carrying the six-lane Brenner Autobahn over the valley of Sill River (Wipptal). At a height of 180 metres (590 feet) and span of 820 metres (2,690 feet), the bridge was celebrated as a masterpiece of engineering upon its completion in 1963. It is a site where bungee-jumping from the bridge has become a popular tourist attraction.

The ever-increasing freight and leisure traffic, however, has been causing long traffic jams at busy times even without border enforcements. The Brenner Pass is the only major mountain pass within the area; other nearby alternatives are footpaths across higher mountains at an altitude of above 2,000 metres (6,600 feet). As a result, air and noise pollution have generated heavy debate in regional and European politics. As of 2004, about 1.8 million trucks crossed the Europa Bridge per year.

== Railway ==
In order to ease the road traffic, there are plans to upgrade the Brenner Railway from Verona to Innsbruck with a series of tunnels, including the Brenner Base Tunnel underneath Brenner. The official groundbreaking of the tunnel took place in 2006 (with survey tunnels drilled in the same year), but substantial work did not begin until 2011. Funding issues have delayed the tunnel's scheduled date of completion from 2022 to no earlier than 2032.

== See also ==
- List of highest paved roads in Europe
- List of mountain passes
- Principal passes of the Alps
