= Südost Autobahn =

Motorway in Austria

Motorway A3
- Südost Autobahn A3

Route information
- Length: 38 km (24 mi)

Major junctions
- From: A 2
- S 31 near Eisenstadt
- To: Eisenstadt; M85 border with Hungary

Location
- Country: Austria
- Regions: Lower Austria, Burgenland
- Major cities: Eisenstadt

Highway system
- Highways of Austria; Autobahns; Expressways; State Roads
← A 2	→ A 4

The Südost Autobahn (A3; 'Southeast Motorway') is a motorway, or ‘Autobahn’, in Austria. It runs from the Süd Autobahn at the junction Knoten Guntramsdorf southeast to Eisenstadt.

It was built between the 1970s and 1996, with multiple sections being opened for traffic once at a time.

Near Eisenstadt the A3 ends, where it crosses the Burgenland Expressway S 31 and merges into the B 16. Motorists can proceed on the B 16 towards the border with Hungary and enter the M85 expressway (Hungary) at Sopron. Plans to link the A3 and the M85 directly at the border have been abandoned by the Austrian authorities due to environmental and climate concerns.
