= Brenner Autobahn =

Road in Austria

Motorway A13
- Brenner Autobahn A13

Route information
- Length: 36 km (22 mi)

Major junctions
- From: Inntal Autobahn
- To: Autostrada A22

Location
- Country: Austria
- Regions: Tyrol
- Major cities: Innsbruck

Highway system
- Highways of Austria; Autobahns; Expressways; State Roads
← A 12	→ A 14

The Brenner Autobahn (Italian: Autostrada del Brennero or Italian: AutoBrennero, English: Brenner motorway) refers to a major European truck route that connects Innsbruck in Austria to Verona in northern Italy.

Numbered as the A13 in the Austrian section, the motorway is relatively short and entirely located within the state of Tyrol. Upon reaching the Italy-Austria border at the Brenner Pass (1,374 m (4,508 ft)), the motorway becomes A22 in Italy and runs to Verona and then to Modena, where it connects to the A1 motorway between Milan and Rome. It is part of the major European route E45.

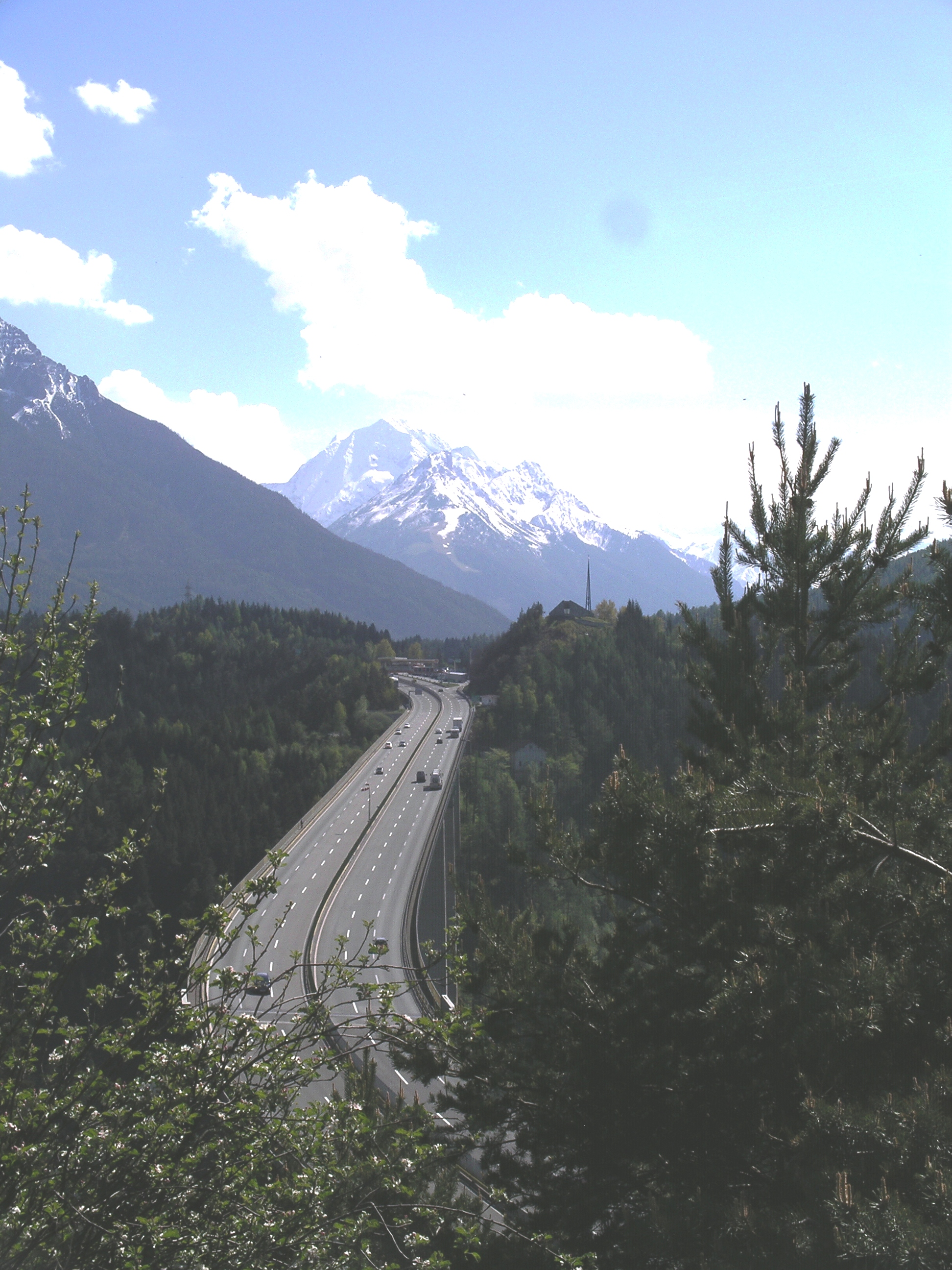
Europabrücke at Patsch near Innsbruck

The historic Brenner Pass is one of the lowest among the Central Eastern Alps; this favourable location was therefore suitable for building the first motorway crossing among the Alpine main chains. Unlike other higher passes across the Alps, the Brenner Pass remains open all year round. Construction of the motorway began in 1959 and the Brenner Autobahn, including the Bridge of Europe (Europe's highest motorway bridge then), was partially open in 1963.

== Route ==
=== Austria ===
The A13 begins in the south of Innsbruck from the east–west motorway A12 Inntal Autobahn (Inn Valley Motorway), which links Bregenz in western Austria to Kufstein near the border of Bavaria in Germany. At 565 m (1,854 ft) above sea, the Brenner Autobahn climbs up the Wipptal (Wipp Valley), passes by the villages Steinach and Gries-am-Brenner, and reaches the Brenner Pass at 1,374 m (4,508 ft) above sea.

=== Italy ===
After the Italy-Austria border, the A22 motorway begins its gradual descent through the Eisack Valley. It passes by the towns of Sterzing and Brixen before arriving outside Bolzano at 262 m (860 ft) above sea. After Bolzano, the motorway continues to Auer, Trento, Rovereto, Ala and meets the A4 Milan-Venice Highway west of Verona. Beyond Verona, the motorway continues to Mantua and Modena, where it terminates and meets the A1 motorway.

== Tolls ==
The Brenner Autobahn is a toll route in both Austria and Italy. When travelling on the Austrian A13, drivers are required to pay extra tolls (German: Maut), either by credit card or cash at the toll plaza at the Schönberg im Stubaital junction or via a Videomaut prepaid system. As the Brenner Autobahn is a so-called special toll section (German: Sondermautstrecke), it is exempt from the toll vignette usually obligatory on Austrian motorways and expressways.

== See also ==
- Autobahns of Austria
- Autostrade of Italy
