= Altlengbach =

- Municipality
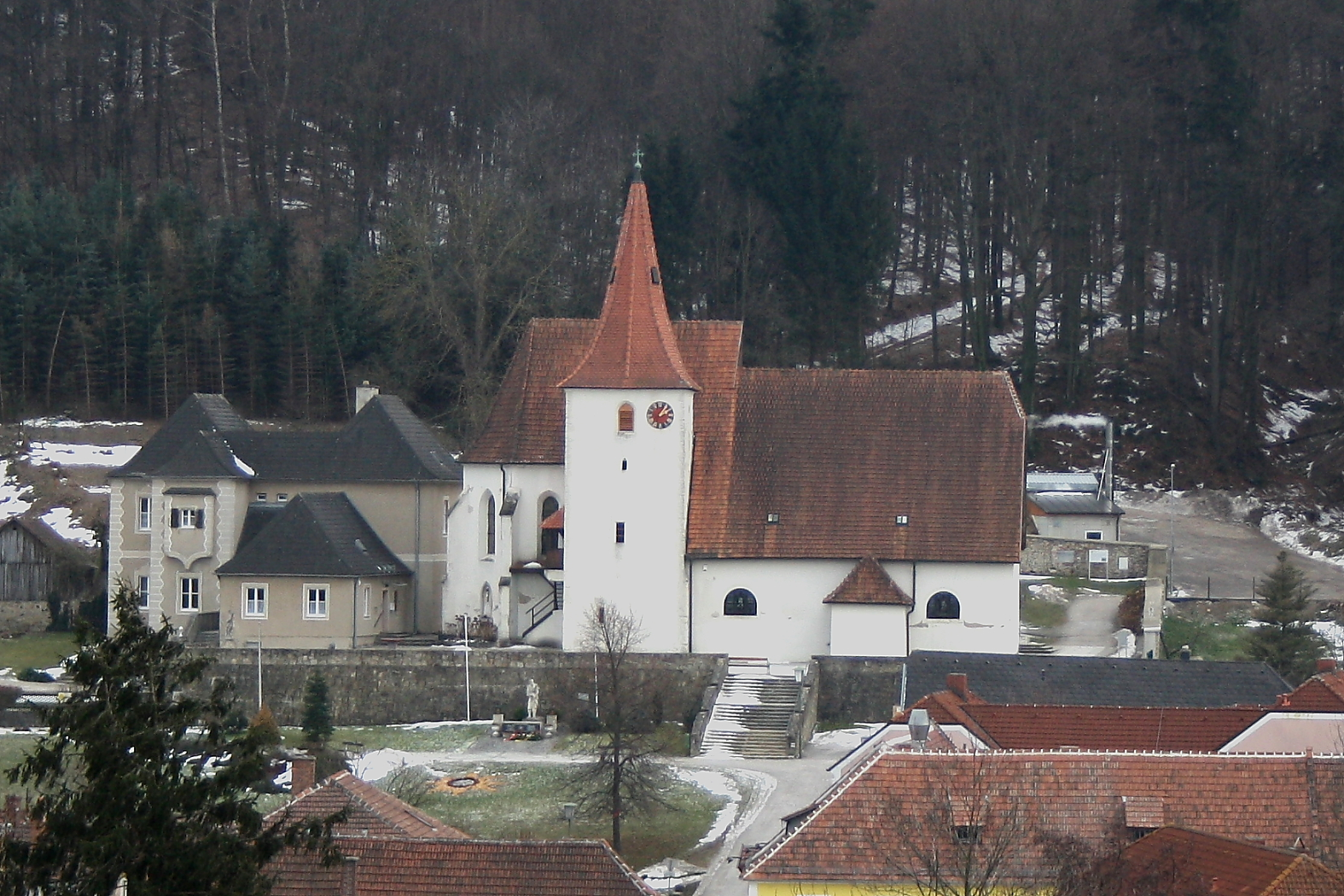
- Town centre and parish church

- Coat of arms

- Location within Austria
- Coordinates: 48°9′N 15°55′E
- Country: Austria
- State: Lower Austria
- District: Sankt Pölten-Land

Government
  - Mayor: Michael Göschelbauer (|ÖVP)

Area
  - Total: 35.59 km^{2} (13.74 sq mi)
- Elevation: 302 m (991 ft)

Population (2018-01-01)
  - Total: 2,927
  - Density: 82.24/km^{2} (213.0/sq mi)
- Time zone: UTC+1 (CET)
  - Summer (DST): UTC+2 (CEST)
- Postal code: 3033
- Area code: 02774
- Website: http://www.altlengbach.gv.at

Altlengbach is a town in the district of Sankt Pölten-Land in the Austrian state of Lower Austria.

There are the following localities in the town: Altlengbach, Audorf, Außerfurth, Gottleitsberg, Großenberg, Gschaid, Haagen, Hart, Hocheichberg, Höfer, Innerfurth, Kleinberg, Kogl, Leitsberg, Lengbachl, Linden, Maiß, Manzing, Nest, Öd, Ödengraben, Pamet, Schoderleh, Steinhäusl, and Unterthurm.

== Population ==
Historical population
Year	Pop.	±%
1971	1,828	—
1981	2,108	+15.3%
1991	2,670	+26.7%
2001	2,791	+4.5%
2015	2,745	−1.6%
