= ASFINAG =

Austrian highway operating company

Autobahnen- und Schnellstraßen-Finanzierungs-Aktiengesellschaft
- Type: Aktiengesellschaft
- Founded: 10 September 1982
- Headquarters: Vienna, Austria
- Key people: Josef Fiala; Hartwig Hufnagl
- Revenue: 2.08 billion EUR (2020)
- Owner: Austria
- Number of employees: 3,000
- Parent: Federal Ministry for Climate Action, Environment, Energy, Mobility, Innovation and Technology (BMK)
- Website: www.asfinag.at

The ASFINAG (short for "Autobahnen- und Schnellstraßen-Finanzierungs-Aktiengesellschaft" which is German for "Autobahn and highway financing stock corporation") is an Austrian publicly owned corporation which plans, finances, builds, maintains and collects tolls for the Austrian autobahns. The ASFINAG is fully owned by the Austrian government under the responsibility of the Federal Ministry for Climate Action, Environment, Energy, Mobility, Innovation and Technology (BMK).

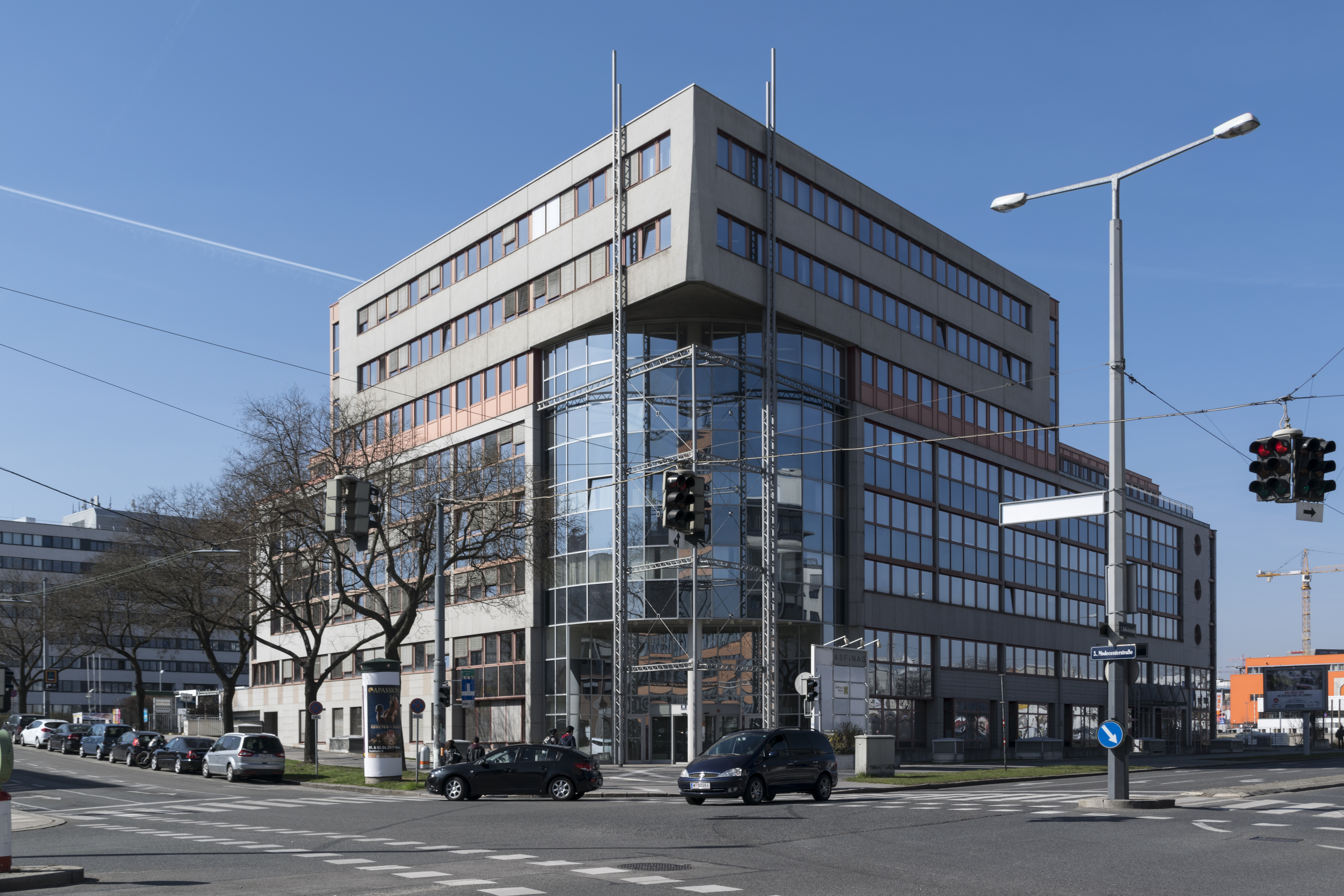
Asfinag Bau Management GmbH Wien, Modecenterstraße 16, 1030

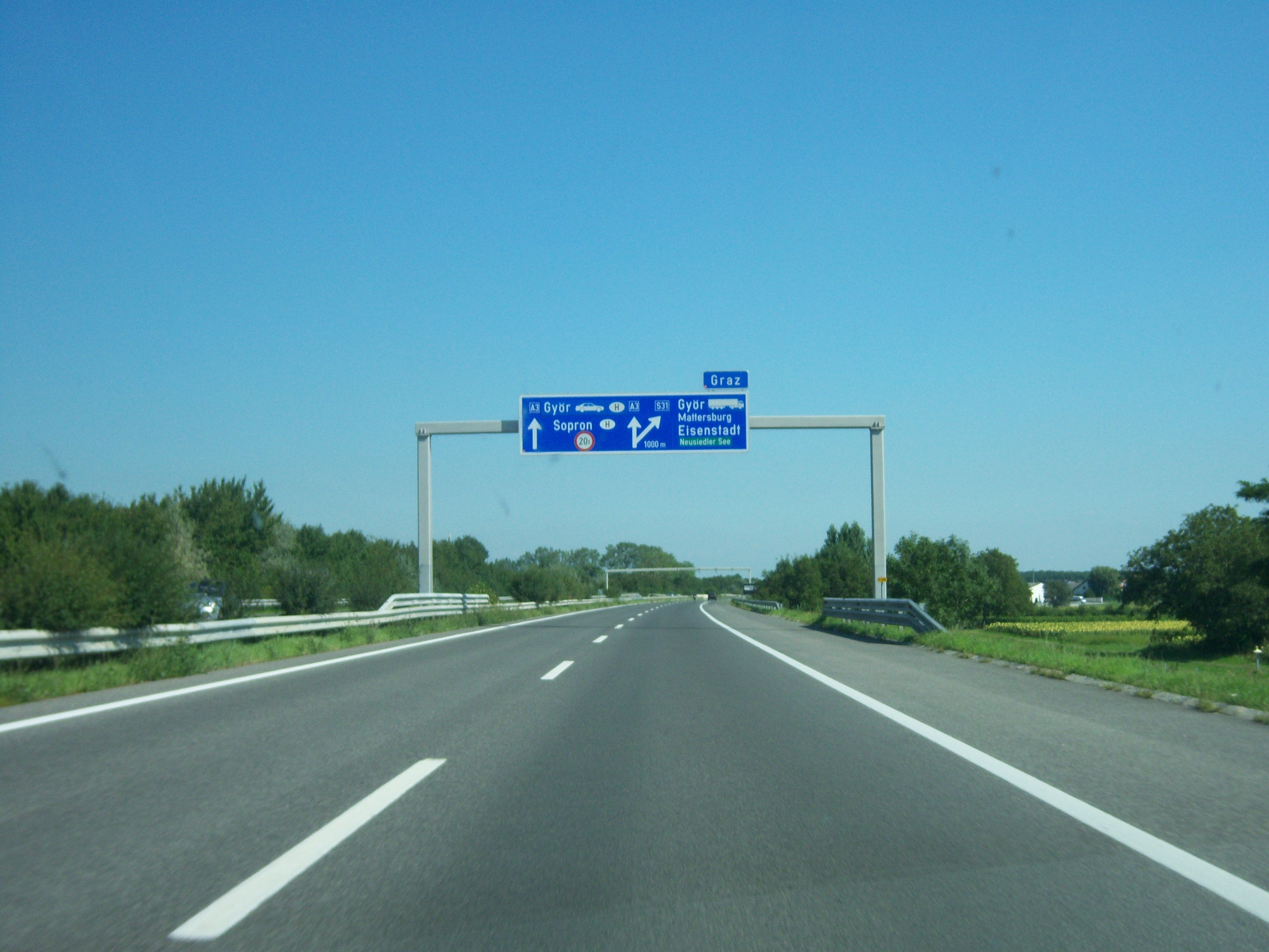
The A3 at the Eisenstadt junction

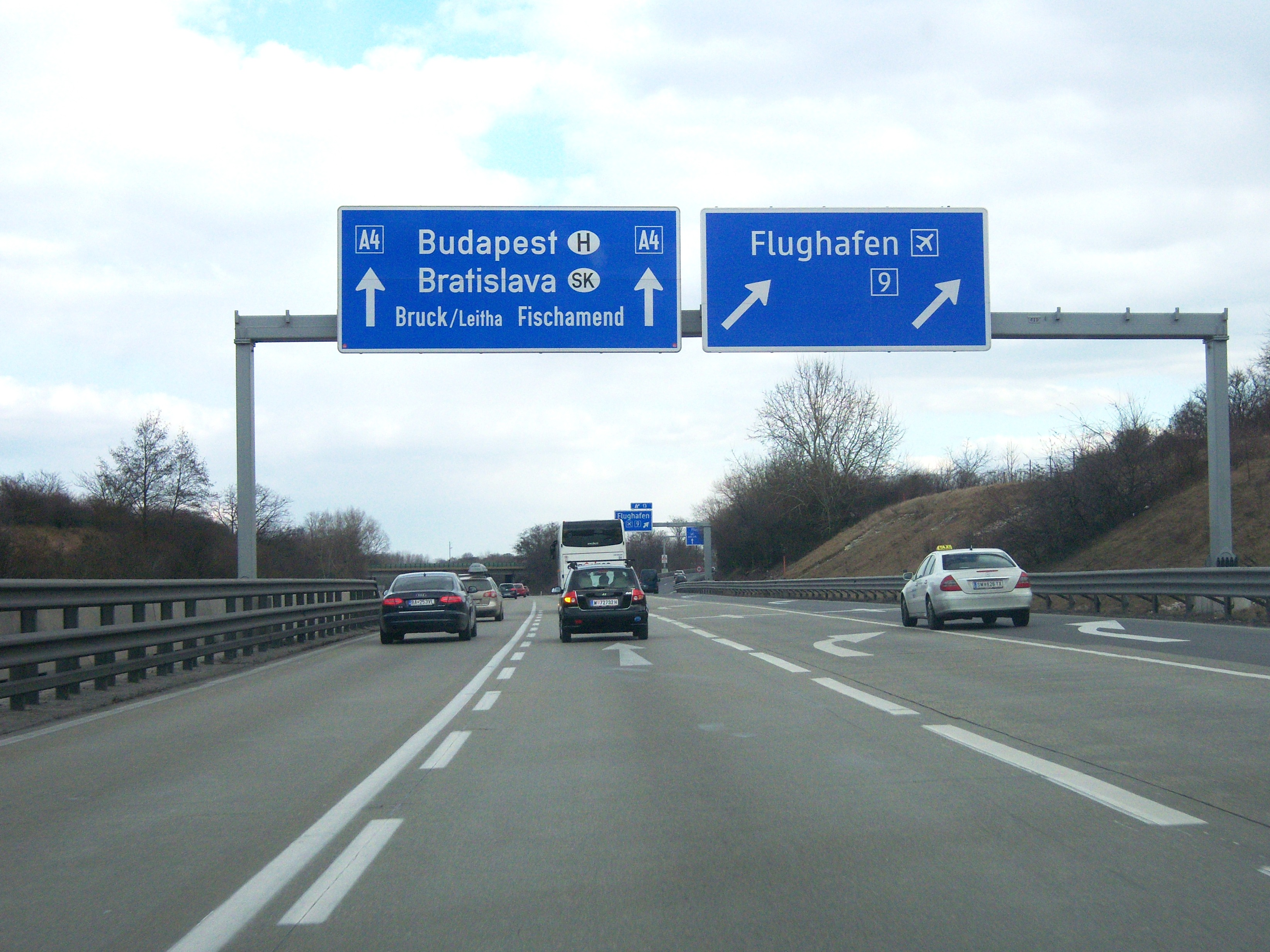
The A4 heading towards Budapest

S3 between Guntersdorf and Wullersdorf

== Purpose ==
A map of the Austrian Autobahn and Schnellstraße system. Blue = Autobahn, Green = Schnellstraße, Dotted = planned or under construction

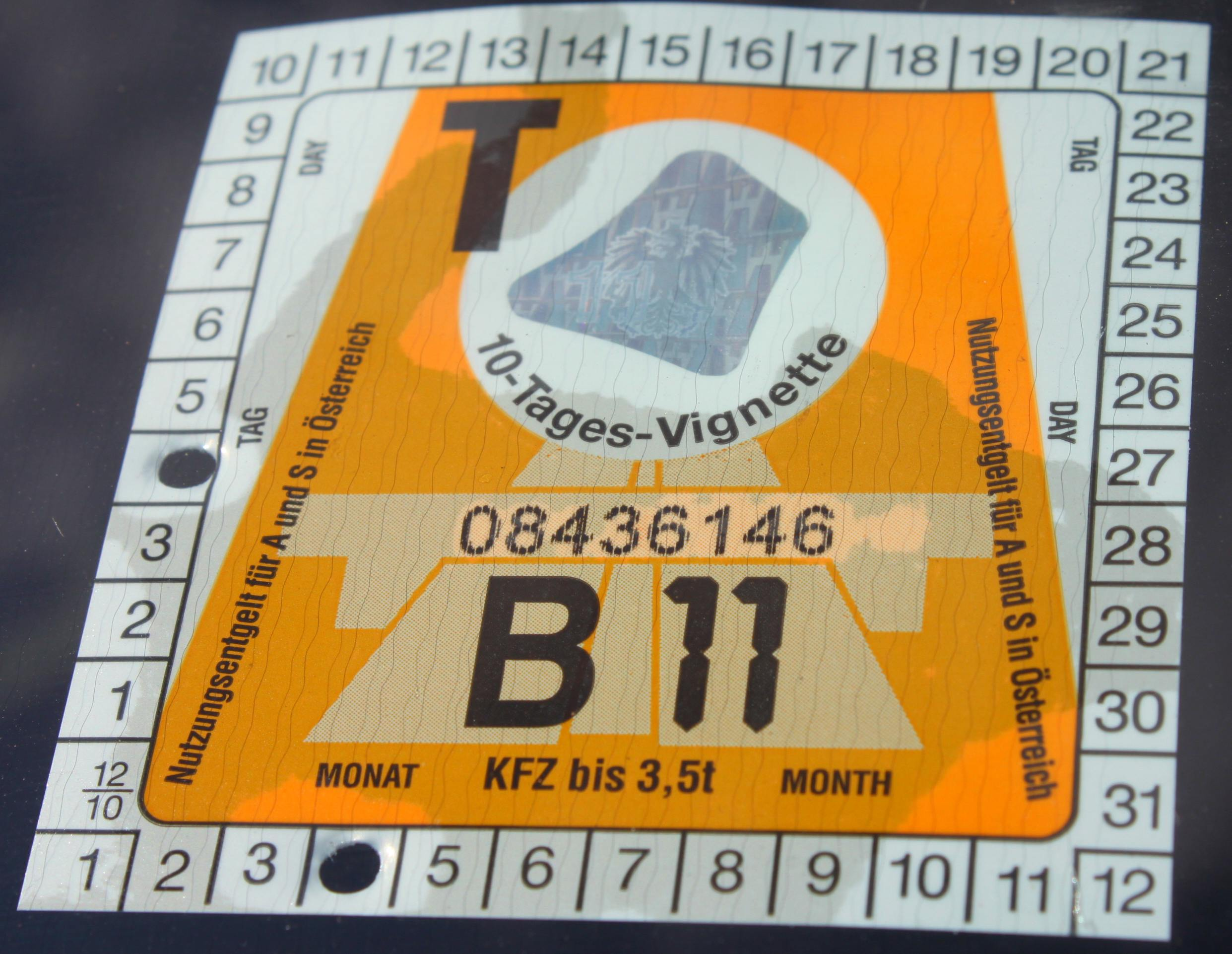
Vignette (toll sticker), fare category car/caravan, valid for 10 days sold in 2011

ASFINAG was founded on 11 September 1982. In 1997, it was granted an expanded mandate by the government, including responsibility for enforcing statutory tolls. The company holds usufruct rights over the national motorway network, which remains state-owned. ASFINAG operates without direct funding from the state budget and pays dividends to the Republic of Austria.

== Fare structure and funding ==
Bad Fischau, motorway restaurant of Hundertwasser

Ventilation system of the Tauern tunnel

For 2015, ASFINAG is expecting 1.25 billion euros (£885 Million) from tolls, which are paid by lorries and buses depending on the number of axles and distance travelled on motorways based on tachographs.

Cars (up to 3.5 t max. permitted total weight) and motorbikes contribute a tax called a Vignette, which has to be stuck permanently to the vehicle, to the general high-ranking street network's usage in the amount of 440 million euros (£311 million) and also 170 million euros (£120 million) of special tolls for more expensive high maintenance roads, from west to east: Arlberg Road Tunnel, the Brennerautobahn (from Innsbruck to Modena, Italy, and only the A13 motorway may be used without a Vignette), Tauern Road Tunnel, Karawanks Tunnel, Bosruck Tunnel and the Gleinalm Tunnel. The collection of these special tolls is completed by single tickets or season tickets which vary in usage (such as a year, month, with route combinations and different discounts for commuters, disabled people and residents), or even tickets for specific roads and multiple journeys. Vehicles which have blue lights, different national and international services, such as Bundesheer (the Austrian Army) and the Justizwache (a section of the Ministry of Justice in Austria) are permanently exempt from the special tolls.

(The mountain roads through the Felbertauern Tunnel and over the Grossglockner High Alpine Road are tolled by private parties.)

In 2015, ASFINAG alone will invest from the money it has collected in tolls, 500 million euros (£353 million) on the building of new roads, 485 million euros (£343 million) for maintaining existing roads, finance the toll collection along with the buying Vignettes from places that sell tobacco and pay back their 11.5 billion euro high (£8.2 billion) debt in 20 years time.

Traffic experts are recommending that instead of time tolls they should collect a higher mineral oil tax because frequent usage, exhaust fumes and also street wear and tear of heavy vehicles, such as SUVs as opposed to city cars can be presented more appropriately.

== History ==
Signs at the ASFINAG parking lot in Dornbach

Benches at the motorway parking lot in Dornbach

The company was founded on 11 September 1982. As of this date, the credit operations were managed centrally for all project companies in Austria. In 1992 ÖSAG (Österreichische Autobahnen und Schnellstraßen AG) and ASG (Alpenstraßen AG) were founded, a merger of the six operating motorway companies in Austria to the ASG in the west, ÖSAG to the rest of Austria.
