= List of bridges in Austria =

This list of bridges in Austria lists bridges of particular historical, scenic, architectural or engineering interest. Road and railway bridges, viaducts, aqueducts and footbridges are included.

== Historical and architectural interest bridges ==
	Name	German	Distinction	Length	Type	Carries Crosses	Opened	Location	State	Ref.
1	Roman Bridge (Oberdorf)	Römerbrücke (Oberdorf)	Cultural heritage		Masonry; 1 semi-circular arch			Bruck an der Mur; 47°24′26″N 15°13′24″E	Styria	(Note: The dating of the three Roman bridges is uncertain, all of them are located near ancient Roman roads. Oberdorf and Adriach Bridges are believed to be part of a road that led from Flavia Solva (near today's Wagna) through the Mur valley to Poedicum (today's Bruck an der Mur) and from there on to Stiriate (today's Liezen). An old Roman main road, the "Via Norica" led at least directly past the settlement in Unterzeiring, just near the bridge of Oberzeiring.)
2	Roman Bridge (Adriach)	Römerbrücke (Adriach)	Cultural heritage	6 m (20 ft)	Masonry; 1 semi-circular arch			Frohnleiten; 47°13′35.6″N 15°19′43.6″E	Styria	
3	Roman Bridge (Oberzeiring)	Brücke von Oberzeiring	Cultural heritage		Masonry; 1 segmental arch	Blabach		Oberzeiring; 47°15′19.1″N 14°30′18.5″E	Styria	
4	High Bridge (St. Georgenberg)	Hohe Brücke (St. Georgenberg)	Leds to St. Georgenberg-Fiecht Abbey; Height : 33 m (108 ft); Cultural heritage	50 m (160 ft)	2 levels Masonry; 1 semi-circular arch Covered bridge Wood	Footbridge; Stanserbach	1709	Stans; 47°22′39.3″N 11°41′33.9″E	Tyrol	
5	Rosanna Bridge (Strengen)	Rosannabrücke, Strengen	Cultural heritage	38 m (125 ft)	Covered bridge Wood	Footbridge; Rosanna	1765	Strengen; 47°07′32.6″N 10°27′40.9″E	Tyrol	
6	Punbrugge	Punbrugge	Cultural heritage	66 m (217 ft)	Covered bridge Wood	Villgratenbach	1781	Heinfels; 46°44′59.4″N 12°26′12.3″E	Tyrol	
7	Gschwendmühl Bridge	Gschwendmühlbrücke	Cultural heritage	28 m (92 ft)	Covered bridge Wood	Weißach	1789	Sulzberg–Riefensberg; 47°31′22.6″N 9°57′52.7″E	Vorarlberg	
8	Stephan Bridge	Stephansbrücke	Span : 43.6 m (143 ft); Height : 28 m (92 ft); Cultural heritage	69 m (226 ft)	Masonry; 1 semi-circular arch	Road bridge Brennerstraße B182; Ruetz (river)	1845	Schönberg im Stubaital–Mutters; 47°12′39.4″N 11°23′22.3″E	Tyrol	
9	Devil's Bridge (Finkenberg)	Teufelsbrücke (Finkenberg)	Devil’s Bridge; Cultural heritage	38 m (125 ft)	Covered bridge Wood	Footbridge; Tux valley	1876	Finkenberg; 47°9′2.5″N 11°49′9.9″E	Tyrol	
10	Urgen wooden bridge	Urgener Holzbrücke	Cultural heritage	35 m (115 ft)	Covered bridge Wood	Footbridge; Inn (river)	1882	Fließ; 47°7′1.6″N 10°36′33.8″E	Tyrol	
11	Trisanna Bridge (1884)	Trisannabrücke (1884)	Height : 88 m (289 ft); Span : 120 m (390 ft)	211 m (692 ft)	Lenticular; Iron	Arlberg railway Sanna (Inn)	1884; 1922	Pians; 47°06′58.5″N 10°29′28.2″E	Tyrol	
12	Schemmerl Bridge	Schemmerl-Brücke		49 m (161 ft)	Truss; Steel	Road bridge Donaukanal	1898	Vienna; 19th–20th district 48°15′33.3″N 16°22′09.2″E	Vienna	
13	Zollamtssteg	Zollamtssteg	Cultural heritage	31 m (102 ft)	Arch; Steel through arch	Footbridge; Wien (river)	1900	Vienna; 1st–3rd district 48°12′35.4″N 16°23′03.8″E	Vienna	
14	Salzach Bridge (Laufen–Oberndorf)	Salzachbrücke (Laufen–Oberndorf)	Cultural heritage	166 m (545 ft)	Suspension; Chain bridge, iron deck and pylons 49+78+39	Road bridge Brückenstraße B156a; Salzach	1903	Oberndorf bei Salzburg–Laufen; 47°56′22.9″N 12°56′18.6″E	Salzburg; Germany	
15	Hohe Brücke, Vienna	Hohe Brücke (Wien)	Cultural heritage	15 m (49 ft)	Beam bridge Steel	Road bridge Wipplingerstraße; Tiefen Graben	1904	Vienna; 1st district 48°12′45.9″N 16°22′07.0″E	Vienna	
16	Altfinstermünz Bridge	Brücke Altfinstermünz	Cultural heritage		Covered bridge Wood	Footbridge; Inn (river)	1949	Nauders–Valsot; 46°55′45.2″N 10°29′12.9″E	Tyrol; Switzerland	
17	Steyrling Bridge	Steyrling-Brücke der Pyhrnbahn	Span : 70 m (230 ft); Cultural heritage	102 m (335 ft)	Masonry; 1 segmental arch	Pyhrnbahn; Steyrling	1905	Steyrling; 47°48′15.5″N 14°9′47.5″E	Upper Austria	
18	Benni Raich Bridge	Benni-Raich-Brücke	Bungee jumping spot Span : 138 m (453 ft); Height : 94 m (308 ft)	138 m (453 ft)	Suspension; Steel	Footbridge; Pitze	1995	Arzl im Pitztal; 47°12′22.8″N 10°46′9.5″E	Tyrol	
19	Holzgau Suspension Bridge	Hängebrücke Holzgau	Span : 200 m (660 ft); Height : 110 m (360 ft)	200 m (660 ft)	Suspension; Steel	Footbridge; Höhenbach	2012	Holzgau; 47°15′54.4″N 10°20′23.5″E	Tyrol	
20	Highline179	Highline179	Span : 406 m (1,332 ft); Height : 114 m (374 ft)	406 m (1,332 ft)	Suspension; Steel	Footbridge	2014	Reutte; 47°27′51.1″N 10°43′08.6″E	Tyrol	

== Major road and railway bridges ==
This table presents the structures with spans greater than 100 meters (non-exhaustive list).

	Name	German	Span	Length	Type	Carries Crosses	Opened	Location	State	Ref.
1	Fourth Linz Danube Bridge under construction	Vierte Linzer Donaubrücke	305 m (1,001 ft)	481 m (1,578 ft)	Suspension; Towerless earth-anchored suspension, composite steel/concrete box girder deck	Linzer Autobahn; Danube	2023	Linz; 48°18′20.7″N 14°16′05.6″E	Upper Austria	
2	Schottwien Bridge	Talübergang Schottwien	250 m (820 ft)	632 m (2,073 ft)	Box girder Prestressed concrete 162+250+162+78	Semmering Schnellstraße; Schottwien valley	1989	Schottwien; 47°39′8.8″N 15°52′12.6″E	Lower Austria	
3	Reichsbrücke (1937) collapse in 1976	Reichsbrücke (1937)	241 m (791 ft)	1,225 m (4,019 ft)	Suspension; Chain bridge, steel deck and pylons 60+241+61	Road bridge Angerner Straße B8; Danube	1937	Vienna; 2nd–22nd district 48°13′37.2″N 16°24′26.3″E	Vienna	
4	Andreas Maurer Bridge	Andreas-Maurer-Brücke	228 m (748 ft)	1,872 m (6,142 ft)	Cable-stayed; Steel box girder deck, 1 steel pylon 138+228+60	Road bridge Bernstein Straße B49; Danube	1973	Hainburg an der Donau–Engelhartstetten; 48°08′46.5″N 16°54′29.9″E	Lower Austria	
5	VÖEST Bridge	VÖEST-Brücke	215 m (705 ft)	407 m (1,335 ft)	Cable-stayed; Steel box girder deck, 1 steel pylons 215+72+2x60	Mühlkreis Autobahn; European route E55; Danube	1972	Linz; 48°19′10.0″N 14°17′56.8″E	Upper Austria	(Note: The length given only takes into account the main bridge, central span(s) and shore span(s), approach viaducts are not counted.)
6	Lingenau Viaduct	Lingenauer Hochbrücke	210 m (690 ft)	368 m (1,207 ft)	Arch; Concrete deck arch	Road bridge Hittisauer Straße L205; Bregenzer Ach	1969	Lingenau; 47°27′8.4″N 9°53′16.5″E	Vorarlberg	
7	Prater Bridge	Praterbrücke	210 m (690 ft)	412 m (1,352 ft)	Box girder Steel; Twin bridges 121+210+82	Südosttangente; European route E59; Danube; New Danube	1970	Vienna; 2nd–22nd district 48°12′23.1″N 16°26′09.7″E	Vienna	
8	Pfaffenberg Bridge	Pfaffenbergbrücke	200 m (660 ft)	377 m (1,237 ft)	Arch; Concrete deck arch	Tauern Railway	1971	Obervellach; 46°54′58.9″N 13°15′12.3″E	Carinthia	
9	Europa Bridge	Europabrücke	198 m (650 ft)	820 m (2,690 ft)	Box girder Steel; 81+108+198+108+2x81	Brenner Autobahn; European route E45; Sill (river)	1963	Innsbruck; 47°12′7.6″N 11°24′6.9″E	Tyrol	(Note: With a 190 metres (620 ft) high deck over the Sill River, the Europa Bridge was the highest bridge in Europe until the opening of Italia and Sfalassà Viaducts in Italia in 1974. It's still the highest bridge in Austria.)
10	Melk-Emmersdorf Danube Bridge	Donaubrücke Melk	190 m (620 ft)	816 m (2,677 ft)	Box girder Prestressed concrete	Road bridge Donau Straße B3a; Danube	1972	Melk–Emmersdorf an der Donau; 48°14′32.7″N 15°20′44.3″E	Lower Austria	
11	Donaustadt Bridge	Donaustadtbrücke	186 m (610 ft)	741 m (2,431 ft)	Cable-stayed; Steel girder deck, 1 steel pylon 186+93+43	Line U2; Vienna U-Bahn; Danube; New Danube	1997	Vienna; 2nd–22nd district 48°12′29″N 16°26′3.6″E	Vienna	
12	Outer Nösslach Bridge	Äußere Nösslachbrücke	180 m (590 ft)	358 m (1,175 ft)	Arch; Concrete deck arch	Brenner Autobahn; European route E45; Grüblbach	1967	Gries am Brenner; 47°04′03.9″N 11°28′52.2″E	Tyrol	
13	Rose Bridge	Rosenbrücke	176 m (577 ft)	440 m (1,440 ft)	Cable-stayed; Concrete box girder deck, 1 concrete pylon	Road bridge Tullner Straße B19; Danube	1996	Tulln an der Donau; 48°20′05.6″N 16°01′39.8″E	Lower Austria	
14	Brigittenau Bridge	Brigittenauer Brücke	175 m (574 ft)	630 m (2,070 ft)	Box girder Steel; 90+175+90; 82+110+83	Road bridge Danube; New Danube	1982	Vienna; 20th–21st district 48°14′16.4″N 16°23′38.9″E	Vienna	
15	Krems Danube Bridge	Donaubrücke Krems	170 m (560 ft)	1,078 m (3,537 ft)	Beam bridge Steel; 84+170+120+84	Road bridge Kremser Straße B37; Danube	1971	Krems an der Donau–Furth bei Göttweig; 48°24′12.7″N 15°37′29.9″E	Lower Austria	
16	Große Mühl Bridge	Brücke über die Große Mühl	170 m (560 ft)	316 m (1,037 ft)	Arch; Concrete deck arch	Road bridge Rohrbacher Straße B127; Große Mühl	1993	Neufelden; 48°28′36.1″N 13°59′43.9″E	Upper Austria	
17	Reichsbrücke	Reichsbrücke	169 m (554 ft)	864 m (2,835 ft)	Box girder Prestressed concrete 87+169+150+2x60	Road bridge Angerner Straße B8; Danube; New Danube	1980	Vienna; 2nd–22nd district 48°13′37.6″N 16°24′27.0″E	Vienna	
18	Pitztal Bridge	Pitztalbrücke	169 m (554 ft)	220 m (720 ft)	Arch; Concrete deck arch	Road bridge Dorfstraße; Inn (river)	1983	Arzl im Pitztal–Karrösten; 47°13′07.1″N 10°45′23.3″E	Tyrol	
19	Floridsdorf Bridge	Floridsdorfer Brücke	167 m (548 ft)	432 m (1,417 ft)	Box girder Steel; Twin bridges 82+167+82	Road bridge Trams in Vienna (lines 30,31,33); Danube	1978	Vienna; 20th–21st district 48°14′49.5″N 16°23′4.2″E	Vienna	
20	Steyregg Bridge	Steyregger Brücke	161 m (528 ft)	453 m (1,486 ft)	Cable-stayed; Composite steel/concrete deck, steel pylons 80x3+161+50	Road bridge Donau Straße B3; Danube	1979	Linz–Steyregg; 48°17′13.4″N 14°20′35.9″E	Upper Austria	
21	Lavant Viaduct	Talübergang Lavant	160 m (520 ft)(x2)	1,079 m (3,540 ft)	Box girder Prestressed concrete Twin bridges 74+146+2x160+155+85	Süd Autobahn; European route E66; Lavant (river)	1981; 2007	Bad Sankt Leonhard im Lavanttal; 46°55′17.8″N 14°50′26.6″E	Carinthia	
22	Falkenstein Bridge	Falkensteinbrücke	157 m (515 ft)	396 m (1,299 ft)	Arch; Concrete deck arch 157+125	Tauern Railway	1973	Obervellach; 46°55′28.4″N 13°14′25.1″E	Carinthia	
23	Traismauer Danube Bridge	Donaubrücke Traismauer	156 m (512 ft)	1,150 m (3,770 ft)	Box girder Prestressed concrete Twin bridges 100+160+100	Kremser Schnellstraße; Danube	2011	Traismauer–Grafenwörth; 48°23′4.5″N 15°43′15.3″E	Lower Austria	
24	Lindischgraben Bridge	Lindischgraben-Brücke	154 m (505 ft)	283 m (928 ft)	Arch; Concrete deck arch	Tauern Railway	1978	Obervellach; 46°55′50.6″N 13°13′35.9″E	Carinthia	
25	Jörg Haider Bridge	Jörg-Haider-Brücke	150 m (490 ft)	445 m (1,460 ft)	Box girder Prestressed concrete 75+125+150+95	Road bridge Drava	2005	Ruden; 46°37′59.6″N 14°46′33.5″E	Carinthia	
26	Grünhübl Mur Bridge	Murbrücke Grünhübl	143 m (469 ft)	610 m (2,000 ft)	Arch; Concrete deck arch	Murtal Schnellstraße; Mur (river)	1976	Judenburg; 47°10′36.2″N 14°38′20.3″E	Styria	
27	Urstein Bridge	Ursteinbrücke	133 m (436 ft)		Arch; Steel tied arch Bow-string bridge	Tauern Autobahn; European route E55; Salzach; Königsseer Ache	1969	Puch bei Hallein; 47°43′53.4″N 13°04′58.0″E	Salzburg	
28	Niederranna Danube Bridge	Donaubrücke Niederranna	137 m (449 ft)	319 m (1,047 ft)	Beam bridge Composite steel/concrete 91+137+91	Road bridge Ebenhoch Landesstraße; Danube	1980	Niederranna–Wesenufer; 48°27′57.4″N 13°47′43.4″E	Upper Austria	
29	Aschach Danube Bridge	Donaubrücke Aschach an der Donau	132 m (433 ft)	326 m (1,070 ft)	Beam bridge Composite steel/concrete 96+132+96	Road bridge Aschacher Straße B131; Danube	1962	Aschach an der Donau–Feldkirchen an der Donau; 48°21′45.4″N 14°01′32.0″E	Upper Austria	
30	VÖEST Bypass Bridges	VÖEST-Bypassbrücken	132 m (433 ft)	289 m (948 ft)	Cable-stayed; Steel box girder deck, 1 steel pylons Twin bridges 85+132+72	Mühlkreis Autobahn; European route E55; Danube	2020	Linz; 48°19′10.8″N 14°17′57.7″E; 48°19′09.3″N 14°17′55.8″E	Upper Austria	
31	Trisanna Bridge	Trisannabrücke	120 m (390 ft)	211 m (692 ft)	Arch; Steel tied arch Bow-string bridge	Arlberg railway Sanna (Inn)	1964	Pians; 47°06′58.4″N 10°29′27.8″E	Tyrol	
32	Linz Railway Bridge (2021)	Linzer Eisenbahnbrücke (2021)	120 m (390 ft)(x2)	397 m (1,302 ft)	Beam bridge Supported by steel arches, composite steel/concrete deck 78+2x120+78	Road bridge Linzer Stadtbahn; Trams in Linz; Danube	2021	Linz; 48°19′01.1″N 14°17′44.8″E	Upper Austria	
33	Cable-stayed Bridge (Vienna)	Schrägseilbrücke (Wien)	119 m (390 ft)	230 m (750 ft)	Cable-stayed; Concrete box girder deck, concrete pylons 56+119+56	Ost Autobahn; European route E58; Donaukanal	1975	Vienna; 1st–11th district 48°10′50.6″N 16°27′04.6″E	Vienna	
34	Kremsbrücke Pressingberg	Kremsbrücke Pressingberg	115 m (377 ft)	2,607 m (8,553 ft)	Box girder Prestressed concrete	Tauern Autobahn; European route E55; Krems	1980	Kremsbrücke; 46°57′43.9″N 13°37′15.4″E	Carinthia	
35	Angertal Bridge	Angertalbrücke	110 m (360 ft)	137 m (449 ft)	Arch; Steel deck arch	Former Tauern Railway; Angerschlucht	1905	Bad Hofgastein; 47°8′55.1″N 13°6′10.9″E	Salzburg	
36	Inner Nösslach Bridge	Innere Nösslachbrücke	110 m (360 ft)	184 m (604 ft)	Arch; Concrete deck arch	Brenner Autobahn; European route E45	1968	Gries am Brenner; 47°03′24.1″N 11°28′49.4″E	Tyrol	
37	Ing. Leopold Helbich Bridge	Ing. Leopold Helbich Brücke	106 m (348 ft)	252 m (827 ft)	Box girder Prestressed concrete 73+106+73	Road bridge Greiner Straße B119; Danube	1967	Grein–Neustadtl an der Donau; 48°12′40.0″N 14°51′23.8″E	Upper Austria; Lower Austria	
38	Pöchlarn Danube Bridge	Donaubrücke Pöchlarn	105 m (344 ft)(x3)	460 m (1,510 ft)	Box girder Prestressed concrete 72+3x105+72	Road bridge Pöchlarner Straße B209; Danube	2002	Pöchlarn–Klein-Pöchlarn; 48°12′55.2″N 15°13′49.4″E	Lower Austria	
39	Nibelungen Bridge (Linz)	Nibelungenbrücke (Linz)	100 m (330 ft)	255 m (837 ft)	Beam bridge Composite steel/concrete	Road bridge Hauptstraße B129; Trams in Linz; Danube	1940	Linz; 48°18′29.7″N 14°17′05.5″E	Upper Austria	
40	Auerlingbach Bridge				Arch; Concrete deck arch	Süd Autobahn; European route E66; Auerlingbach		Preitenegg; 46°57′32.0″N 14°55′37.4″E	Carinthia	
41	Pressingberg Bridge				Arch; Concrete deck arch	Tauern Autobahn; European route E55		Kremsbrücke; 46°56′12.4″N 13°36′23.2″E	Carinthia	
42	Draubrücke (A10)	Draubrücke (A10)			Box girder Prestressed concrete	Tauern Autobahn; European route E55; Drava	1986	Villach; 46°38′28.8″N 13°48′20.9″E	Carinthia	
43	Großdorf Bridge	Großdorfer Brücke		358 m (1,175 ft)	Box girder Prestressed concrete	Road bridge	1982	Lingenau–Egg; 47°26′32.5″N 9°55′22.5″E	Vorarlberg	
44	Jedlesee Bridge	Jedleseer Brücke			Cable-stayed; Steel deck, concrete pylons	Footbridge; New Danube	1983	Vienna; 21st district 48°16′5.6″N 16°22′22.6″E	Vienna	

== Notes and references ==
- Notes
- Nicolas Janberg. "International Database for Civil and Structural Engineering". Structurae.com.
- Others references

== See also ==
- Transport in Austria
- Roads in Austria
- Rail transport in Austria
- Geography of Austria
- List of crossings of the Danube
- de:Wiener Donaubrücken (in German) - Vienna Danube Bridges
- List of bridges by district of Vienna: de:1st, Innere Stadt, de:2nd, Leopoldstadt, de:3rd, Landstraße, de:4th, Wieden, de:5th, Margareten, de:6th, Mariahilf, de:7th, Neubau, de:8th, Josefstadt, de:9th, Alsergrund, de:10th, Favoriten, de:11th, Simmering, de:12th, Meidling, de:13th, Hietzing, de:14th, Penzing, de:15th, Rudolfsheim-Fünfhaus, de:16th, Ottakring, de:17th, Hernals, de:18th, Währing, de:19th, Döbling, de:20th, Brigittenau, de:21st, Floridsdorf, de:22nd, Donaustadt, de:23rd, Liesing
- de:Liste der Brücken in Linz (in German) - List of bridges in Linz
- de:Liste der Fußgängerbrücken in Graz (in German) - List of footbridges in Graz
- de:Brücken Salzburgs (in German) - Salzburg Bridges
- de:Liste der höchsten Brücken in Österreich (in German) - List of highest bridges in Austria
