= Tobadill Church =

Church building in Tobadill, Austria

Coordinates: 47°07′33″N 10°30′47″E

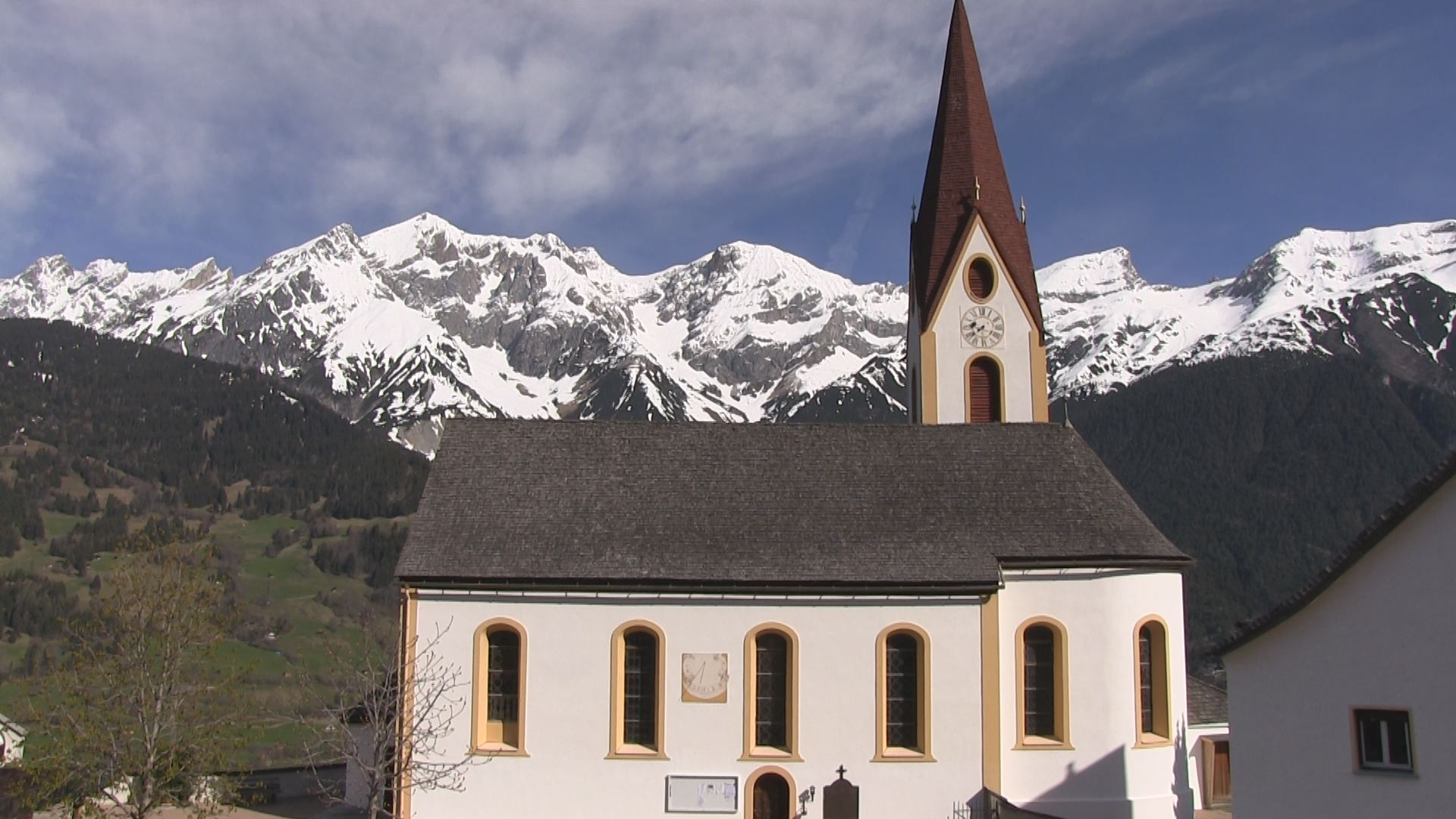
Tobadill Church

Tobadill Church is a church in Tobadill, Tyrol, Austria. It is dedicated to Magnus of Füssen.

It originated as a 1705 chapel, replaced by a church designed by Kassian Grießer between 1735 and 1737. The latter was consecrated in 1751, whilst the tower was added in 1768. The church was enlarged in 1792 and a ceiling painting added the following year by Johann Georg Witwer, showing St Magnus in Glory in the choir, St Magnus defeating the dragon and St Magnus healing the possessed in the nave and the four evangelists in the side chapels.

== Sources ==
- The bells of the church
- Dehio Tirol 1980, Tobadill, Pfarrkirche hl. Magnus im Weiler Feld, Seiten 813f
- "Pfarre Tobadill". pfarre-tobadill.at.
