= Saaho =

2019 Indian film by Sujeeth

- Theatrical release poster
- Directed by: Sujeeth
- Written by: Sujeeth
- Produced by: V. Vamsi Krishna Reddy; Pramod Uppalapati
- Starring: Prabhas; Shraddha Kapoor; Chunky Panday; Jackie Shroff; Arun Vijay; Neil Nitin Mukesh
- Cinematography: R. Madhi
- Visual effects by: R. C. Kamalakannan
- Edited by: A. Sreekar Prasad
- Music by: Songs: Tanishk Bagchi; Guru Randhawa; Badshah; Shankar–Ehsaan–Loy; Score: Ghibran
- Production companies: UV Creations; T-Series
- Distributed by: India: AA Films; Worldwide: Yash Raj Films; Phars Films
- Release date: 30 August 2019 (India)
- Running time: 170 minutes
- Country: India
- Languages: Telugu; Hindi
- Budget: ₹350 crore
- Box office: est. ₹451 crore (Note: Saaho's reported worldwide grosses vary between ₹434 crore (Deccan Herald) – ₹439 crore (India Today))

Saaho (transl. May Victory be Yours) is a 2019 Indian action thriller film written and directed by Sujeeth and produced by UV Creations and T-Series. Filmed simultaneously in Telugu and Hindi, it stars Prabhas (in his Hindi film debut) in the titular role, alongside an ensemble cast of Shraddha Kapoor, Chunky Panday, Jackie Shroff, Arun Vijay, Neil Nitin Mukesh, Lal, Tinnu Anand, Murali Sharma, Vennela Kishore, Mandira Bedi, Mahesh Manjrekar, Evelyn Sharma, Devan and Prakash Belawadi. The film follows two undercover officers who are searching for a mastermind responsible for stealing ₹2,000 crore (US$284 million) and soon realise that the case is linked to the death of a prominent business tycoon and an emerging gang war for the control of a megalopolis.

Principal photography took place in the span of two years, from August 2017 to July 2019, across India, the UAE, Romania and Austria. The film has music composed by Tanishk Bagchi, Guru Randhawa, Badshah and Shankar–Ehsaan–Loy, a film score composed by Ghibran, cinematography handled by R. Madhi and editing by A. Sreekar Prasad.

Saaho was released worldwide on 30 August 2019 in standard and IMAX theatres. The film received negative reviews from critics, who praised the action sequences, VFX and cinematography, but criticised the script and direction. It grossed₹ 451 cr worldwide against a production budget of ₹350 crore. The Telugu version of the film underperformed, while the Hindi version became an above average grosser, thus emerging as the highest-grossing South Indian film of 2019 and second highest-grossing Indian film of 2019. It is the first instalment in the Sujeeth Cinematic Universe, followed by They Call Him OG (2025).

== Plot ==
Narantak Roy is the supreme leader of the Roy Group, a massive conglomerate masking the world's most powerful crime syndicate, which covertly governs the fictional metropolis of Waaji City. During a business trip to Mumbai, Roy is assassinated in a meticulously engineered car crash. Seizing the power vacuum, Devaraj, the ambitious son of former syndicate leader Pruthviraj, plots to usurp the throne. However, Ibrahim, Roy's fiercely loyal confidant, reveals to the syndicate’s legal advisor, Kalki, that Roy had secretly raised an estranged son, Vishwank Roy, in anonymity for 25 years. Vishwank immediately assumes control of the group and initiates a hunt for his father's killers.

Concurrently, an elusive master thief pulls off a staggering ₹2,000 crore heist in Mumbai by manipulating unrelated individuals to execute the crime. The police department assembles a specialized task force led by Ashok Chakravarthy, an enigmatic covert operative. Ashok investigates alongside Crime Branch officers Amritha Nair, Goswami, and a cyber-intelligence expert named David. The team tracks a primary suspect, Jai, whom Ashok casually confronts at a bar. Ashok inadvertently reveals the existence of a high-tech "black box", the definitive key required to open a subterranean vault in Waaji City containing ₹2,00,000 crore belonging to the Roy Group's board members. Acting on Vishwank's directives, Kalki retrieves the box from Mumbai and secures it in a high-security bank.

Following an elaborate technological pursuit to intercept Jai as he steals the box, Amritha, Ashok, and David corner the thief. In a massive twist, it is revealed that "Jai" is actually the real undercover officer, Ashok Chakravarthy, while the man pretending to be the lead investigator is the master thief himself, known as Saaho. Assisted by David, who was a double agent within the police tech team, Saaho escapes with the black box. It is progressively revealed that Devaraj was the mastermind behind Roy's assassination. Sent to apprehend Saaho, Amritha acts as a double agent, tracking him down under the guise of romance to secure a cut of the loot. However, she genuinely falls in love with Saaho and betrays the police force.

Devaraj subsequently shoots and abducts Amritha, blackmailing Saaho into surrendering the black box. Saaho outmaneuvers him by handing the key over to Vishwank instead, securing Amritha's safe release. Saaho then aggressively demolishes Devaraj's corporate headquarters and pillages his private reserves. The real Ashok and the police launch a heavy military ambush against Saaho using snipers and jetpacks. Saaho overpowers the tactical forces and rescues Amritha from a falling helicopter using a jetpack, though he is ultimately detained. Meanwhile, Kalki, who has secretly defected to Devaraj's faction, utilizes Vishwank's cloned fingerprints and the black box to unlock the legendary Waaji vault, only to find it completely devoid of currency, containing nothing but ancestral portraits.

Saaho escapes custody and decimates Devaraj’s army in Karana, a heavily fortified village historically protected by Roy. When Devaraj arrives to confront him, Saaho finally reveals his true identity: he is Siddharth Nandan Saaho, the legitimate biological son of Narantak Roy, who was hidden abroad to protect him until he was ready to inherit the empire. An enraptured Kalki dies from shock upon realizing the truth, and Saaho brutally executes Devaraj.

Simultaneously, Ashok and Amritha learn the full scope of the deception from Vishwank and Alex Fernandes, an international criminal allied with Saaho. In Waaji City, Ibrahim introduces Saaho to the remaining board members, explaining that "Vishwank" was actually his own son, Iqbal, placed on the throne as a proxy to safeguard the family lineage until Saaho could return to avenge his father. After Iqbal eliminates the surviving conspirators, Saaho officially takes his place as the supreme ruler of Waaji City and CEO of the Roy Group. Months later, Saaho reunites with Amritha in Innsbruck, Austria, remaining hyper-vigilant of a distant sniper targeting him.

== Cast ==
As per the film's opening and end credits. (Note: The opening credits do not mention Chunky Pandey's name and the end credits do not mention Tinnu Anand's name)

- Prabhas as Siddhanth Nandan Saaho / Ashok Chakravarthy (fake)
  - Karthikeya Krishna as Siddhanth, six years old
  - Suman as Siddhanth, thirteen years old
- Shraddha Kapoor as Amritha "Ammu" Nair, Saaho's love interest and a CID officer
- Jackie Shroff as Narantak Roy Nandan, Saaho's father and the former ruler of The Waaji City
- Neil Nitin Mukesh as Ashok Chakravarthy (original) / Jay (fake), an undercover R&AW agent
- Arun Vijay as Iqbal Ibrahim (original) / Vishwank Roy Nandan, Ibrahim's son
  - Joy as young Iqbal
- Vennela Kishore as Goswami, a police officer
- Murali Sharma as David Karuna
- Lal as Ibrahim, Iqbal / Vishwank's father and Narantak's lieutenant-in-chief
- Anish Kuruvilla as a police officer
- Prakash Belawadi as Shinde IPS
- Chunky Panday as Devaraj "Deva"
- Mahesh Manjrekar as Prince
- Tinnu Anand as Pruthviraj
- Tanikella Bharani as Indian External Affairs Minister Ramaswamy (Note: His character has the last name Allagadda in the Telugu version.)
- Mandira Bedi as Kalki Gopalacharya
- Evelyn Sharma as Jennifer
- Sharath Lohitashwa as Mani
- Devan as IG Devan Varma
- Supreeth as Alexander Fernandes
- Duvvasi Mohan as SI
- Ravi Varma as Ajay
- Jacqueline Fernandez as a go-go dancer (cameo appearance in the item song "Bad Boy")
- Shravan as the first victim
- Temper Vamsi as the third victim
- Damini Chopra as Preethi
- Gemini Suresh as a jewelry store worker (Note: Erroneously credited as "Suitcase")
- Mukhtar Khan as Basha
- Abhay Bethiganti as an assistant manager
- Bikramjeet Kanwarpal as board member Jayender Singh

Uncredited

- Shyraa Roy as Natasha
- Pradeep Kabra as the Good Luck! Bakery van driver

== Production ==
=== Development and casting ===
Sujeeth narrated the script to Prabhas in January 2015. Katrina Kaif and Alia Bhatt rejected to star in the film with the latter giving the reason that she wanted more performance oriented roles. Shraddha Kapoor was later confirmed in August 2017 with Prabhas receiving three times her remuneration.

=== Filming and post-production ===
Saaho was produced on a budget of ₹325 crore, and was filmed in Hyderabad, Mumbai, Abu Dhabi, Dubai, Austria, Romania and other parts of Europe. Principal photography began in August 2017. A large part of the budget was spent on filming the action scenes. International stunt coordinator Kenny Bates was brought in to choreograph the action scenes.

Saaho was simultaneously filmed in Telugu and Hindi, (Note: Many important scenes were planned to be simultaneously filmed in Tamil; however, the film was mostly dubbed in Tamil. (Note: The CBFC certificate of the Tamil version indicates that it is not a dubbed version.)) Saaho was Prabhas' debut in Hindi cinema and Kapoor's debut in Telugu cinema.

The first schedule, which was in Hyderabad, was completed by October 2017. The second schedule began in December 2017 at Ramoji Film City; according to the film's producers, Shraddha Kapoor's action sequences in the film were made with heavy weaponry. After a few days, filming shifted to Dubai for a month; some of the major action sequences were filmed in Dubai with Prabhas and Neil Nitin Mukesh, while Shraddha Kapoor switched to her next project Stree. After filming half of Saaho in Hyderabad, Mumbai and Dubai, the cast and crew began the fourth schedule in Abu Dhabi in February 2018, which ended within a few weeks. The fifth schedule, also in Abu Dhabi, started in late February and the sixth schedule began in mid-March in Dubai and Romania. The final leg of film and its romantic songs were filmed in Innsbruck and the Tyrol region of Austria.

An action sequence that features in an exceptionally long period of the screenplay was extensively filmed near the Burj Khalifa; 25 crores from the budget had been spent. Prabhas underwent rigorous training that involved cardiovascular and weight training, and plyometric obstacle races. Prabhas praised his co-star Shraddha Kapoor, stating she was the best choice for her strong character. Prabhas' character was depicted in grey-shades.

The film also included some underwater sequences with Prabhas, who learnt scuba diving in preparation for his role. The film stars Neil Nitin Mukesh as the antagonist. Mandira Bedi, who is known for her grey roles on television, plays a negative role in the film as well.

Choreographer Vaibhavi Merchant filed two romantic songs; filming began in Innsbruck, Austria, and included the House of Music, the city's trams, Finstertal in Kühtai and Adlers Hotel. Some scenes were filmed in the nearby town Seefeld. Romantic songs were filmed at the "Top of Tyrol" viewing platform on Stubai Glacier, Restaurant ice Q in Sölden, Swarovski Crystal Worlds and the suspension bridge Highline179 at Reutte in the Tyrol region. Some parts of one romantic song were filmed at Redbull's Hangar 7 at Salzburg Airport. Robinville and Creative Creatures were service producers for the Austria schedule. The entire filming was wrapped by July 2019.

It was reported that the post-production for the movie was to be under Prabhas' direct supervision. Delays in post production resulted in the makers pushing the release date by 15 days.

== Music ==
Saaho

Soundtrack album by Tanishk Bagchi, Guru Randhawa, Badshah and Shankar–Ehsaan–Loy
- Released: 28 August 2019
- Recorded: 2019
- Genre: Feature film soundtrack
- Length: Telugu version: 13:21; Hindi version: 14:26
- Languages: Telugu; Hindi
- Label: T-Series

The songs and background score in Saaho were composed by Tanishk Bagchi, Guru Randhawa, Badshah, Shankar–Ehsaan–Loy and Ghibran respectively. The lyrics were written by Krishna Kanth and Sreejo in Telugu, Tanishk Bagchi, MellowD, Guru Randhawa, Badshah, and Manoj Yadav in Hindi. A bonus track "Bang Bang (Saaho Bang)" was released after the film's release. In a music review, a writer from The Times of India wrote, "All in all, all of Saaho’s songs are quite hummable. But do they go together as an album? Maybe not, because there is no one thread linking them all, except for the lead actors — Prabhas and Shraddha, and the fact that you know that these songs are from the same film".

=== Tracklist Telugu ===
Track listing
No.	Title	Lyrics	Music	Singer(s)	Length
1.	"Psycho Saiyaan"	Sreejo	Tanishk Bagchi	Anirudh Ravichander, Dhvani Bhanushali, Tanishk Bagchi	2:46
2.	"Ye Chota Nuvvunna"	Krishna Kanth	Guru Randhawa	Haricharan, Tulsi Kumar	3:14
3.	"Bad Boy"	Sreejo	Badshah	Badshah, Neeti Mohan	2:57
4.	"Baby Won't You Tell Me"	Krishna Kanth	Shankar–Ehsaan–Loy	Shweta Mohan, Siddharth Mahadevan, Shankar Mahadevan	4:22
Total length:					13:19

=== Tracklist Hindi ===
Track listing
No.	Title	Lyrics	Music	Singer(s)	Length
1.	"Psycho Saiyaan"	Tanishk Bagchi, MellowD	Tanishk Bagchi	Sachet Tandon, Dhvani Bhanushali, Tanishk Bagchi	2:46
2.	"Enni Soni"	Guru Randhawa	Guru Randhawa	Guru Randhawa, Tulsi Kumar	4:18
3.	"Bad Boy"	Badshah	Badshah	Badshah, Neeti Mohan	2:58
4.	"Baby Won't You Tell Me"	Manoj Yadav	Shankar–Ehsaan–Loy	Alyssa Mendonsa, Ravi Mishra, Shankar Mahadevan	4:22
Total length:					14:24

=== Tracklist Tamil ===
Track listing
No.	Title	Lyrics	Music	Singer(s)	Length
1.	"Kadhal Psycho"	Madhan Karky	Tanishk Bagchi	Anirudh Ravichander, Dhvani Bhanushali, Tanishk Bagchi	2:46
2.	"Mazhaiyum Theeyum"	Madhan Karky	Guru Randhawa	Haricharan, Shakthisree Gopalan	3:13
3.	"Bad Boy"	Vignesh Shivan	Badshah	Badshah, Benny Dayal, Sunitha Sarathy	2:57
4.	"Unmai Edhu Poy Edhu"	Madhan Karky	Shankar–Ehsaan–Loy	Shweta Mohan, Shankar Mahadevan	4:22
Total length:					13:18

=== Tracklist Malayalam ===
All lyrics are written by Vinayak Sasikumar.

Track listing
No.	Title	Music	Singer(s)	Length
1.	"Psycho Saiyaan"	Tanishk Bagchi	Yazin Nizar, Dhvani Bhanushali, Tanishk Bagchi	2:46
2.	"Ekaantha Thaarame"	Guru Randhawa	Haricharan, Shakthisree Gopalan	3:13
3.	"Bad Boy"	Badshah	Badshah, Benny Dayal, Sunitha Sarathy	2:57
4.	"Baby Won't You Tell Me"	Shankar–Ehsaan–Loy	Shweta Mohan, Shankar Mahadevan	4:22
Total length:				13:18

=== Background score ===
Saaho

Film score by Ghibran
- Released: 25 December 2019 (Vol.1); 18 February 2020(Vol.2)
- Recorded: 2018–2019
- Genre: Film score
- Length: 16:23(Vol.1); 28:07(Vol.2)
- Language: Telugu
- Label: Ghibran
- Producer: Ghibran

Ghibran chronology
Rakshasudu (2019)	Saaho (2019)	Petromax (2019)

The Background Score album was split into Volume 1 and Volume 2, Vol.1 was released on 25 December 2019 and Vol.2 was released on 18 February 2020. The background score composed and conducted by Ghibran.

Saaho, Vol.1 (Original Background Score)
No.	Title	Length
1.	"Walk to the Throne"	1:22
2.	"The Revelation( Intercal BGM)"	1:26
3.	"I Am Vishwank Roy"	1:36
4.	"Theme of Roy(Father of Waaji City)"	1:43
5.	"Thief or Police"	2:15
6.	"The Hero's Intro"	1:27
7.	"Karmashya Shloka(Story of Karana Village)"	1:30
8.	"Hero's Cliff Jump"	1:24
9.	"The Twilight/Kiss"	2:24
10.	"Love at First Sight"	1:16
Total length:		16:23

Saaho, Vol.2 (Original Background Score)
No.	Title	Length
1.	"Saaho-Theme"	1:26
2.	"The Black Box Theme"	1:31
3.	"The Final Revelation"	2:13
4.	"Coffee For Ashok"	1:06
5.	"Boom/Chase/Jetman"	11:12
6.	"You are a Freaking Genius Man"	1:22
7.	"Love You Dad"	2:21
8.	"The Three Murders"	1:14
9.	"The Blood Bath"	2:12
10.	"The Romantic Gunfight"	1:42
11.	"The Bank Heist"	1:48
Total length:		28:07

== Marketing ==
The first teaser was released alongside Baahubali 2: The Conclusion (2017) and gained attention for featuring jetpacks.

The first teaser poster featuring Prabhas from the film was revealed on his birthday, 22 October 2017; the poster received criticism, saying is similar to the poster of Blade Runner 2049. In July 2019, UV Creations announced the film's release date as 30 August 2019 in Telugu, Hindi, Tamil, and Malayalam.

Saaho – The Game, a first-person shooter mobile game was created by the Hyderabad-based company Pixalot Labs and was released on 15 August 2019. Zee Entertainment Enterprises took broadcasting rights in all languages. Amazon Prime Video took digital rights.

== Release ==
=== Theatrical ===
Saaho was released on 30 August 2019 worldwide in Telugu, Hindi, and Tamil, along with a dubbed Malayalam version.

=== Home media ===
The film began streaming on Amazon Prime Video from 19 October 2019 in Telugu, Tamil, Kannada and Malayalam languages. The Hindi version began streaming on Netflix from 8 December 2019.

=== Lawsuit ===
Outshiny India, a luggage and bag manufacturer, filed a complaint and lawsuit against the director and multiple staff members for fraud and cheating at Madhapur police station. The manufacturers alleged the filmmakers defaulted on an expensive deal they signed with the manufacturer that mandated their product would be shown in the film. The company said the marketing, advocate and contract fees paid to the filmmakers resulted in a loss of ₹1.38 crore ($196,000).

=== Allegations of plagiarism ===
Jerome Salle, director of the 2008 film Largo Winch, claimed that the film was an unauthorized remake of his film, after similarities between Saaho and his work were pointed out to him by social media users. He had earlier claimed plagiarism, from the same 2008 film, by the makers of another Telugu film Agnyaathavaasi (2018) at the time of its release.

== Reception ==
=== Box office ===
Saaho made ₹130 crore ($18.4 million) on its opening day worldwide, the second-highest ever for an Indian film, exceeding that of 2.0's ₹117 crore ($16.6 million) but lower than Prabhas's previous film Baahubali 2: The Conclusion ₹212 crore, which held the record for the highest-opening Indian film at that time. After the second day, the worldwide collection was ₹220 crore. Saaho made ₹294 crore ($41.7 million) gross on its opening weekend worldwide. Its net revenue in India was ₹302 crore ($42.9 million). It concluded its theatrical run with a worldwide gross estimated to be ₹434–439 crore.

=== Critical response ===
On the review aggregator website Rotten Tomatoes, the film reported an approval rating of 8% based on 12 reviews with an average rating of 3.8/10.

Ronak Kotecha of The Times of India gave 2.5/5 stars and wrote "Saaho is an ambitious project which relies on technical aspects and hero's larger than life image, and not on its script."

Bollywood Hungama gave 2.5/5 stars and wrote "Saaho suffers from a lackadaisical script and a vacuous screenplay."

Monika Rawal Kukreja of Hindustan Times gave 2/5 stars and wrote "Saaho is a classic action thriller that could have been made on par with Hollywood, but is reduced to an average story sprinkled with elements of romance, suspense and revenge. Watch it for the last 30 minutes and don’t expect pieces of puzzles to fall into place and make up a believable story, because there isn’t any." Rahul Devulapalli of The Week gave 2/5 stars and wrote "Even with a towering Prabhas armed with a ripped body and fancy guns, Saaho fails to hit the target."

Dhaval Mehta of DNA gave 2/5 stars and wrote "Saaho is a rank disappointment and an opportunity missed. Watch it for Prabhas’s patches of brilliance but you will need loads of patience!." Shubhra Gupta of The Indian Express gave 1.5/5 stars and wrote "Everything a thriller needs is in here, and you settle down, fully prepared for a non-stop, breathless, firing-from-all-cylinders ride, but Saaho turns out to be a damp squib."

Rajeev Masand of News18 gave the film one-and-a-half stars out of five; he praised Prabhas for his "enormous presence and unmistakable sincerity" but said the film has "all the depth and emotional wallop of a video game".

Lakshana N Palat from India Today gave Saaho one-and-a-half stars out of five, calling it "a 350-crore disaster", and a "laboured and exhausting watch". She has added; "the saving grace of Saaho are the visuals and the high-octane action sequences", and that "the makers got so carried away with crafting action scenes and Prabhas' starry presence that they forgot about the story and character development midway".

Sangeetha Devi Dundoo of The Hindu wrote "Riding on a staid and predictable plot, this ambitious film ends up as a disappointment." Anupama Chopra of Film Companion wrote "Saaho is essentially a string of expensive set-pieces strung together to showcase the leading man. A lot of hard work has gone into creating the action and the extravagant sets. The budget is a reported 350 crores but for the viewer there's little bang for the buck."

Rachel Saltz of The New York Times wrote, "The glue meant to hold the whole thing together is the star, Prabhas, who plays the hero-turned-villain-turned-hero again. But the actor, who made his mark in Telugu cinema [...] doesn’t display much range here. Though his character has more than one identity, he’s always the same know-it-all Mr. Cool".

=== Accolades ===
Prabhas won the ETC Bollywood Business Awards for Highest Grossing Debut Actor.

== See also ==
- List of multilingual Indian films
- Pan-Indian film
- List of longest films in India
- They Call Him OG a film in the same universe that takes place between 1970-1993.
