= Trisanna Bridge =

Trisanna Bridge Trisannabrücke
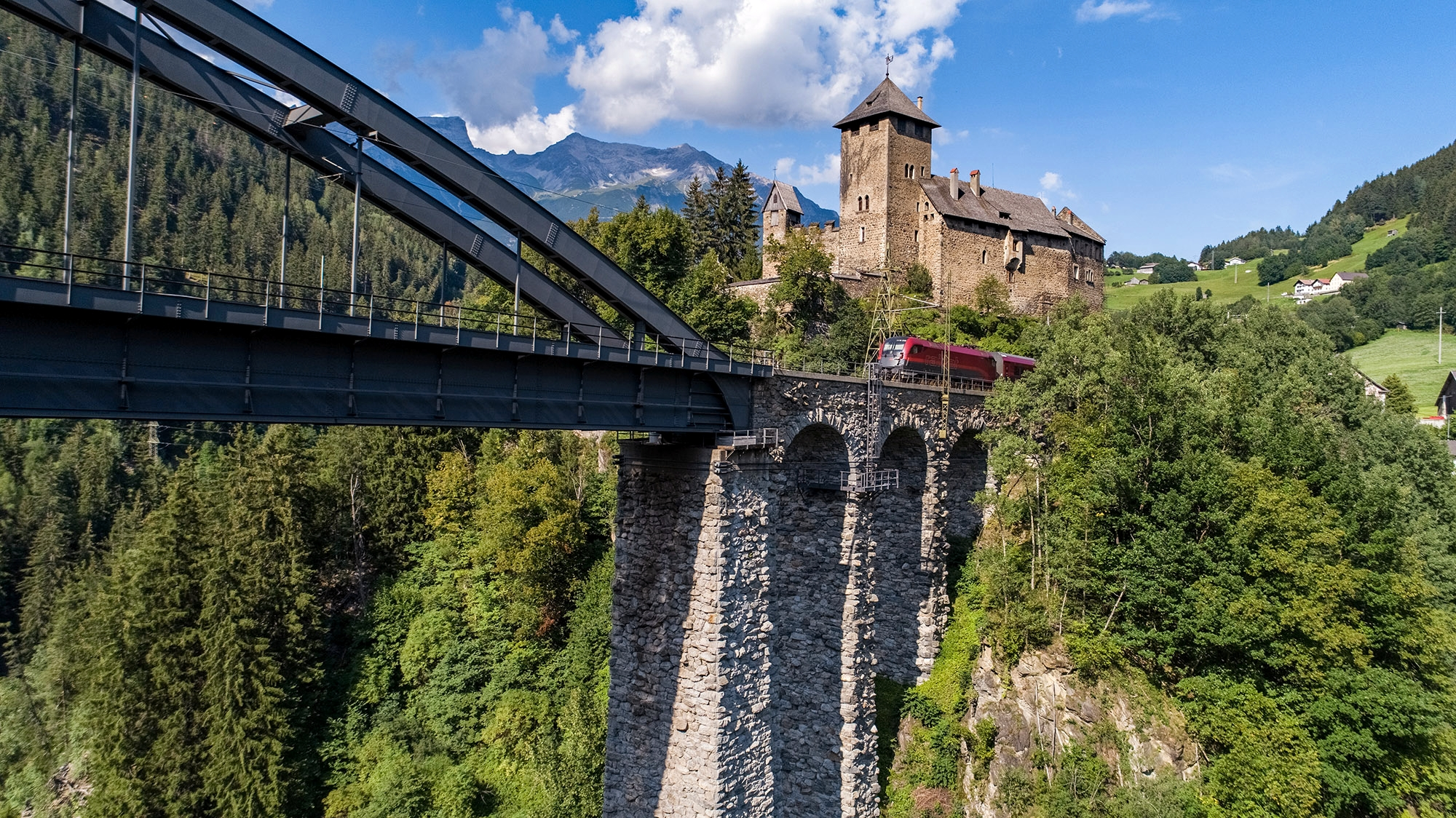
- Coordinates: 47.11623°N 10.49111°E
- Carries: Arlberg railway
- Crosses: Trisanna gorge
- Locale: Landeck, Tyrol, Austria
- Owner: Österreichische Bundesbahnen (ÖBB)

Characteristics
- Design: Tied arch bridge
- Material: Masonry (piers) & Steel (main span)
- Total length: 211 metres (692 ft)
- Longest span: 120 metres (390 ft)
- Clearance below: 86 metres (282 ft)

Rail characteristics
- No. of tracks: 1
- Track gauge: 1,435 mm (4 ft 8.5 in) standard gauge
- Electrified: 15 kV/16,7 Hz AC Overhead line

History
- Designer: Waagner-Biro (1964 arch)
- Fabrication by: Waagner-Biro
- Construction start: 1882
- Opened: 1884
- Rebuilt: 1964

Location
- Interactive map of Trisanna Bridge

The Trisanna Bridge (German: Trisannabrücke) is a 211-metre (692 feet) long viaduct carrying the Arlberg railway over the Trisanna river just southwest of Pians, a district of Landeck (Tyrol) in Austria. The bridge spans the Paznaun valley and Trisanna gorge, forming part of one of the most important east-west railway routes in the Alps.

At the time of its completion in 1884, it was the longest steel support structure in the world. It is still considered by many to be amongst the finest bridges in Austria, and is overlooked on its eastern side by Wiesberg Castle. Together with the castle, the bridge has formed the backdrop for thousands of railway photographs.

== Geography ==
The Arlberg railway is one of only two east-west railway connections across the Austrian Alps, and thus, the route has strategic importance. The bridge is located between the stations of Pians and Strengen, in the Austrian state of Tyrol. The terrain surrounding the bridge is highly mountainous, the nearest major peak being the 3,168-metre (10,394 feet) high Hoher Riffler.

Due to the steep gradient of the railway, the bridge deck is constructed on a gradient of 26‰.

== History ==
=== First bridge (1882-1922) ===
The first incarnation of the present bridge was built concurrent with the construction of the Arlberg railway from 1882 to 1884. This structure was similar to the present bridge, and comprised masonry arches 55 metres (180 ft) high supporting the main span, which was a 120 metres (390 ft) long through truss bridge built of iron. The bridge was commissioned by Julius Lott, the builder of the Arlberg railway, who entrusted Viennese expert Ludwig Huss to design and build the bridge.

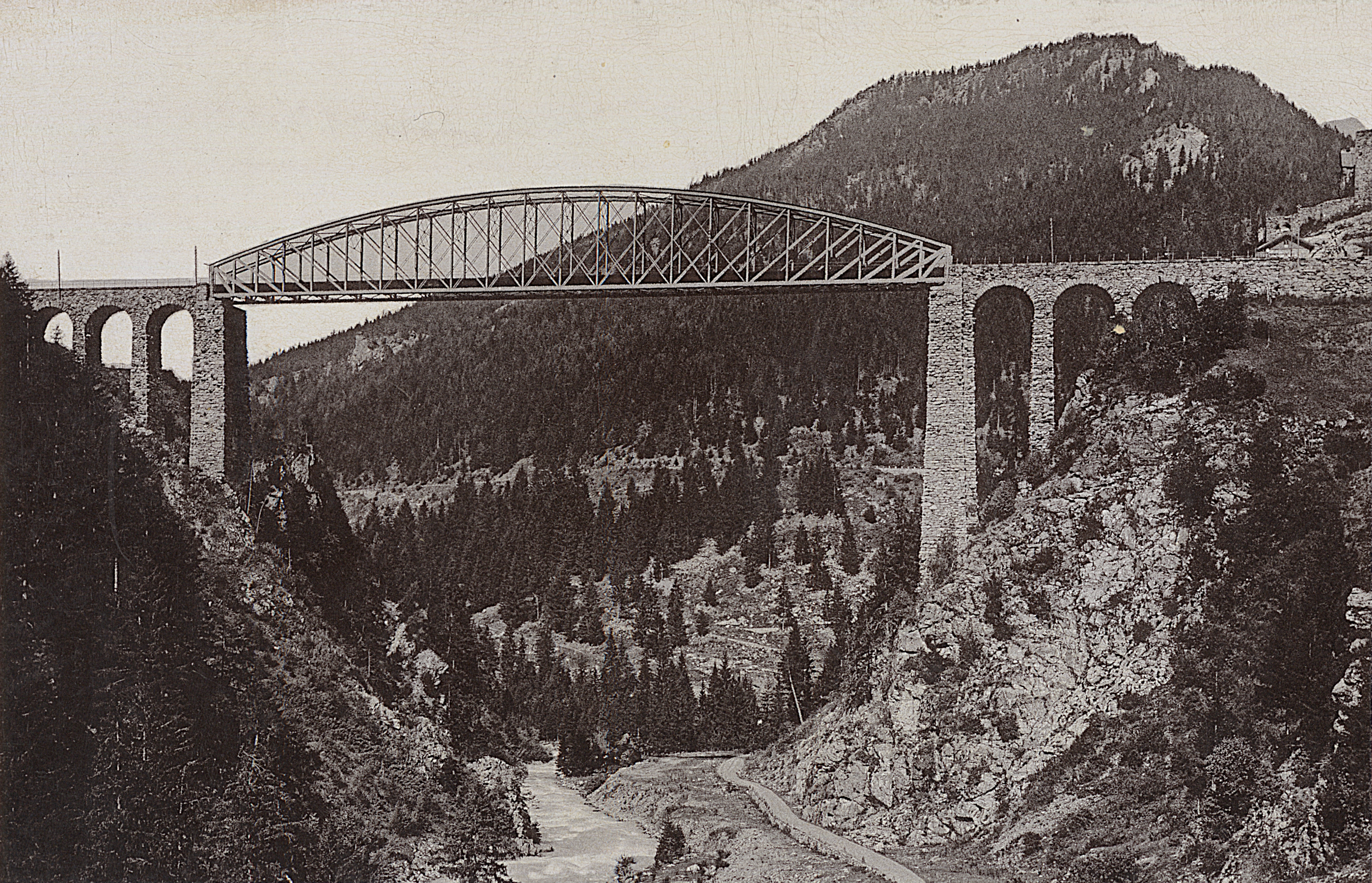
The first bridge, as constructed, seen in 1895.

Huss had many challenges, including the exposed and mountainous location, and the need to make sure the bridge was properly able to withstand the considerable braking forces from trains descending the valley. More than 400 workers were employed to construct the bridge, and the bridge was officially opened on September 21, 1884.

The bridge was strengthened several times in the early 20th century, most notably in 1908 due to increasing train loads. There were plans in 1914 to replace the bridge with a concrete arch, and possibly move the location of the bridge, however the onset of the First World War meant the plans never came to fruition.

=== Second incarnation (1922-1964) ===
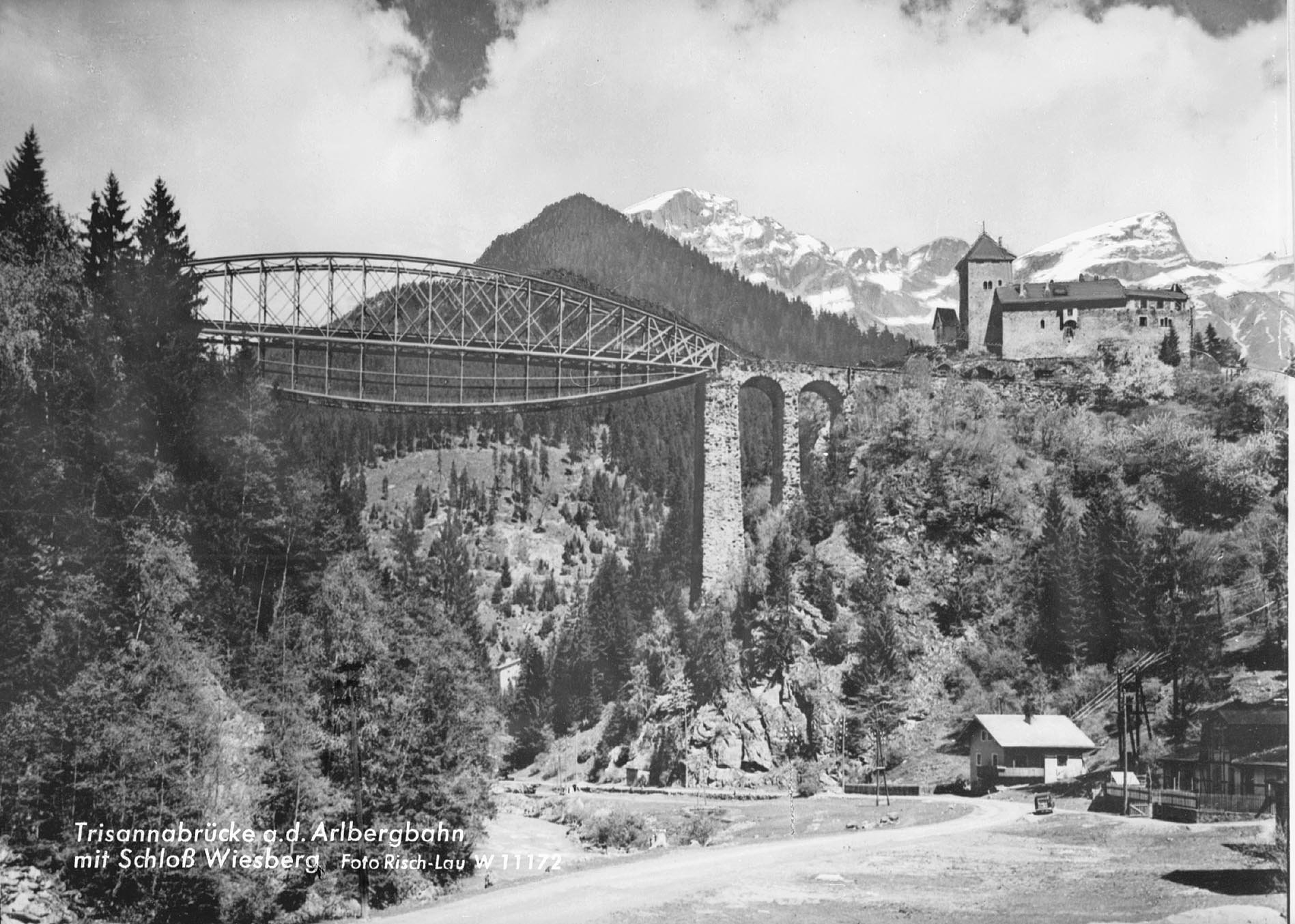
The second incarnation of the bridge, following installation of the lenticular truss, seen in 1958.

The Arlberg railway was electrified in stages during the 1920s, which along with it, brought heavier and longer trains. The bridge's main span was strengthened by transforming it into a lenticular truss bridge, nicknamed "fish belly" due to its distinctive shape. The vaults and arches of the supporting arches were also restored during this restoration, by injecting cement mortar into the various cracks and crevices that had developed since its construction.

To construct the new lenticular truss, and to support the bridge deck whilst it was under construction, four massive cast iron scaffolding piers, each some 75 metres (246 ft) high, were built on the valley floor. The completed scaffolding piers, which were then joined together to make one massive tower, weighed a total of 1,359 tonnes (1,359,000 kg). The new lenticular truss, added to the underside of the train deck, weighed 732 tonnes (732,000 kg).

=== 1964 rebuild and present bridge ===
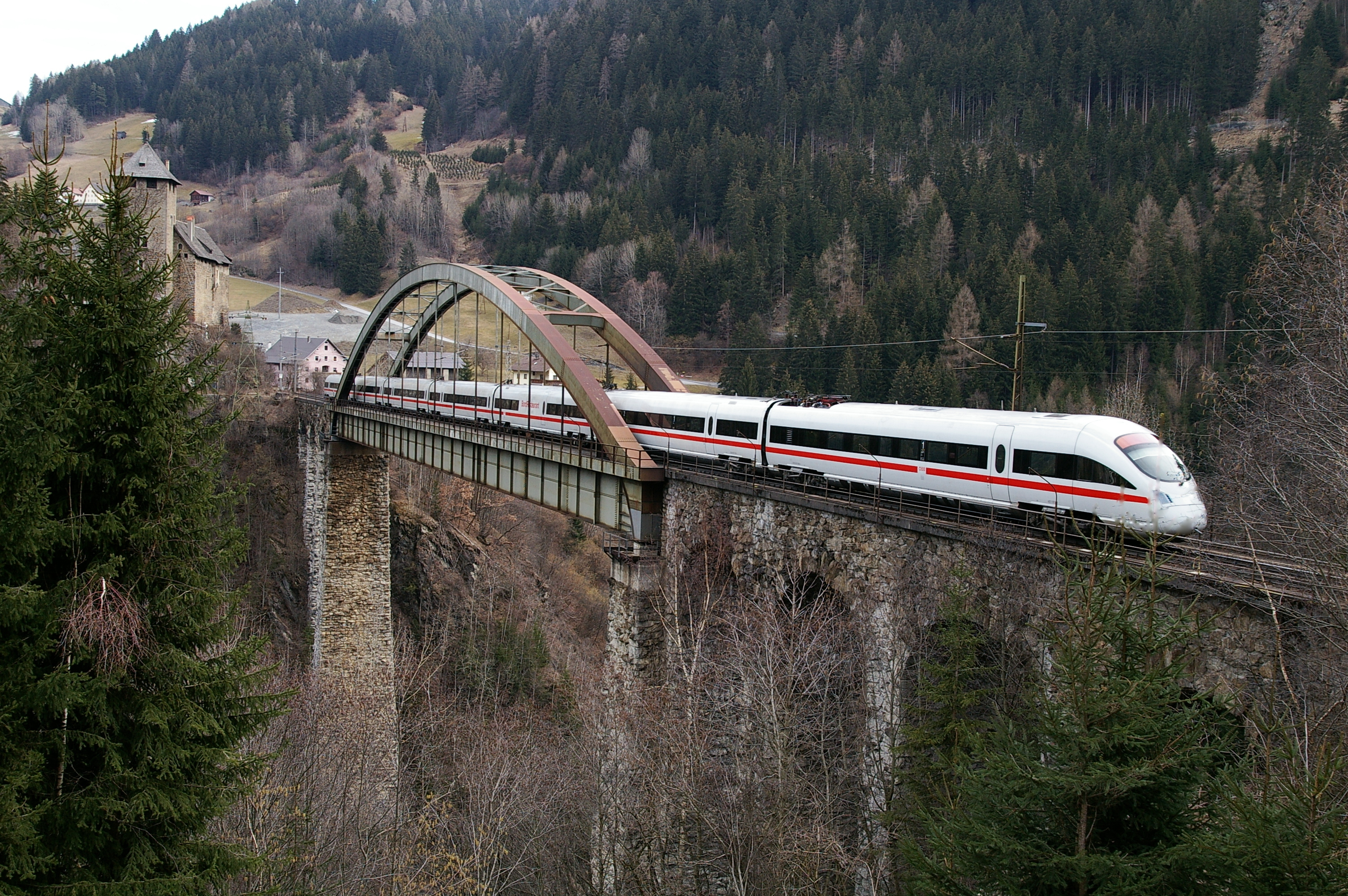
A modern ICE T high speed train crosses the present bridge.

By 1964, the requirements of modern railway traffic meant the bridge was not capable of carrying the many local, intercity and cross-border services that were using the Arlberg line, so Waagner-Biro was contracted to replace the main span, and to strengthen the masonry piers that support it. So not to disrupt the busy workings of the railway, the new main span was constructed on a raised platform nearly 90 metres (300 ft) above the valley floor, parallel to the bridge. When the new span was completed, the railway was closed so as to allow the new span to be slid out across onto the masonry piers, and the old span dismantled. Despite the difficulty of the task, it was completed in only 11 hours on November 16, 1964, when the railway reopened.

Since 1964, the bridge has had no major attention. Following the strengthening in 1964, the bridge continues to be supported by the original piers from the 1882 construction.

== Dimensions ==
- Height of deck: 86 metres (282 ft)
- Main span: 120 metres (390 ft)
- Total length: 211 metres (692 ft)
- Height of main arch above deck: 15 metres (49 ft)
- Weight of arch: 720 tonnes
