= Gueuroz Bridge =

Gueuroz Bridge Pont du Gueuroz
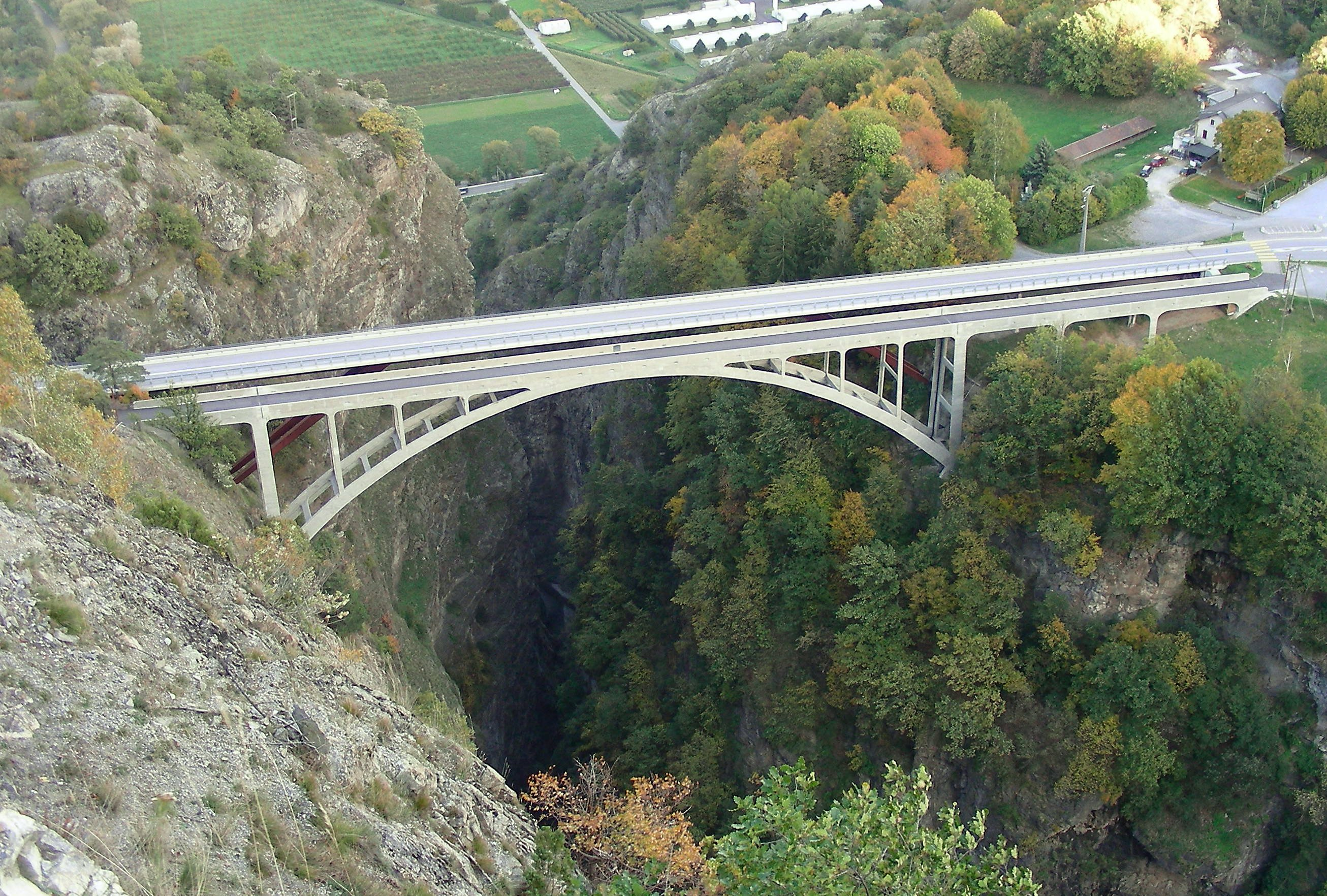
- Coordinates: 46.1286°N 7.04056°E
- Crosses: Trient
- Locale: Valais, Switzerland

Characteristics
- Material: Reinforced concrete
- Total length: 187 metres (614 ft)

History
- Construction start: 1931
- Construction end: 1934

The Gueuroz Bridge is a reinforced concrete arched bridge in Switzerland.

== History ==
The bridge crosses the gorges of the Trient at a height of 187 meters between Vernayaz and Salvan and connects Salvan to Martigny. The bridge was constructed between 1931 and 1934 and held the record of highest bridge in Europe for 29 years before being dethroned by the Europabrücke in 1963. The Gueuroz Bridge has a length of 168.36 m. The engineers charged with the project were Alexandre Sarrasin (1895-1976) for the study and Richard Coray for the construction. Sarrasin managed to solve vibration problems and was a pioneer in the field of large concrete structures.

== New bridge ==
A new bridge was constructed in 1994 next to the original structure. It was constructed so as not to hide the architecture of the original bridge, which now holds pedestrian and cyclist traffic. Road traffic has been diverted to the new bridge.
