= Wiesberg Castle =

Castle in Austria

Coordinates: 47.1169°N 10.4928°E

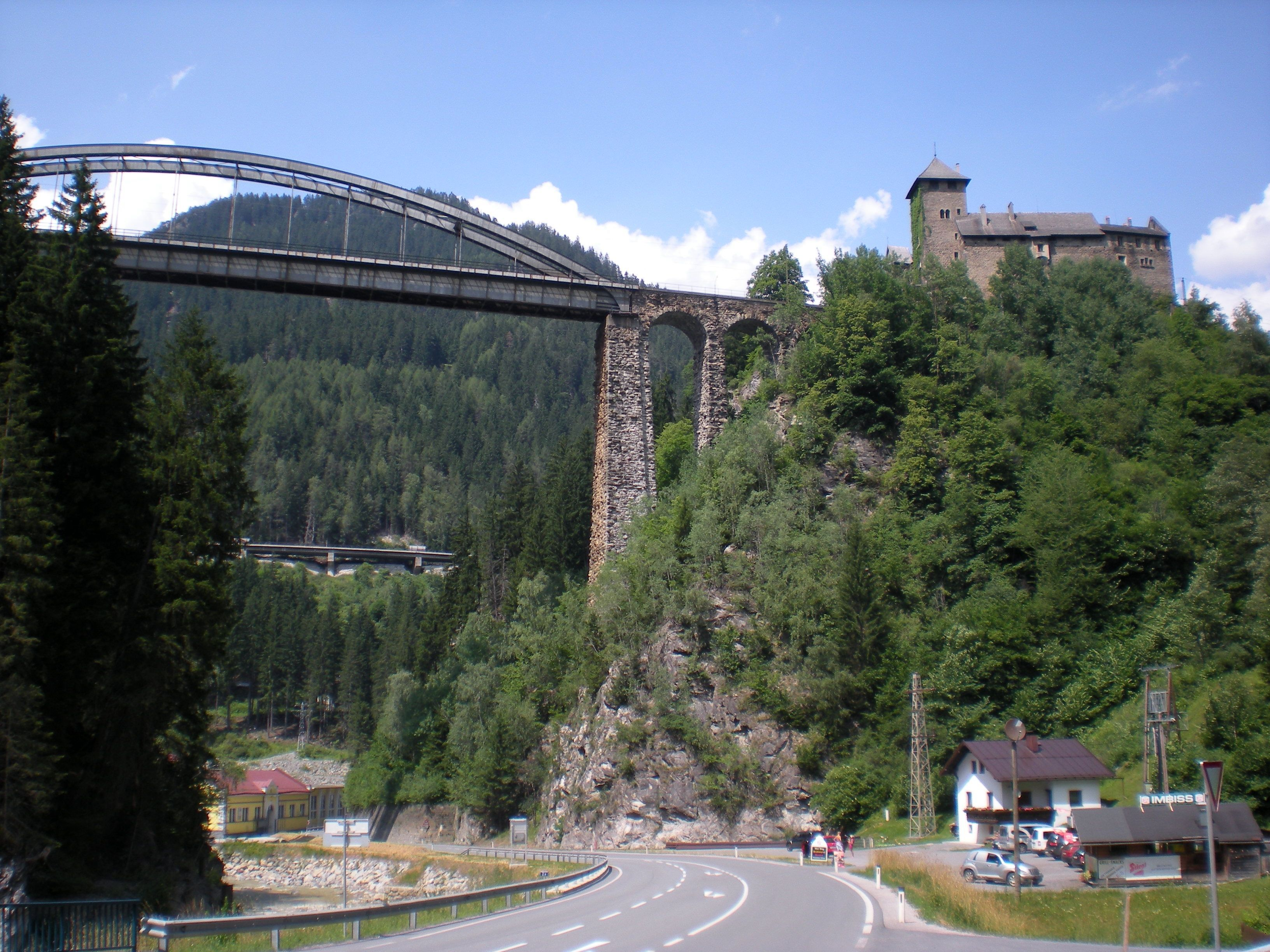
Wiesberg Castle with the Trisanna Bridge

Wiesberg Castle (German: Schloss Wiesberg) stands above the Trisanna River, where the Paznaun Valley leads into the Stanzer Valley.

== History ==
Near the castle in 1809 several hundred local militia defended the area against Bavarian and French troops. From the end of the 14th century until 1411, the castle was owned by the Rottenberger family. From 1770 until 1840, the castle was owned by the Dukes of Wolkenstein.

== Today ==
Today Schloss Wiesberg is a privately held property and is not open to the public. The castle can be seen from the Silvretta-Hochalpenstraße. This road is usually closed in winter.
