= Europa Bridge =

Europa Bridge Europabrücke
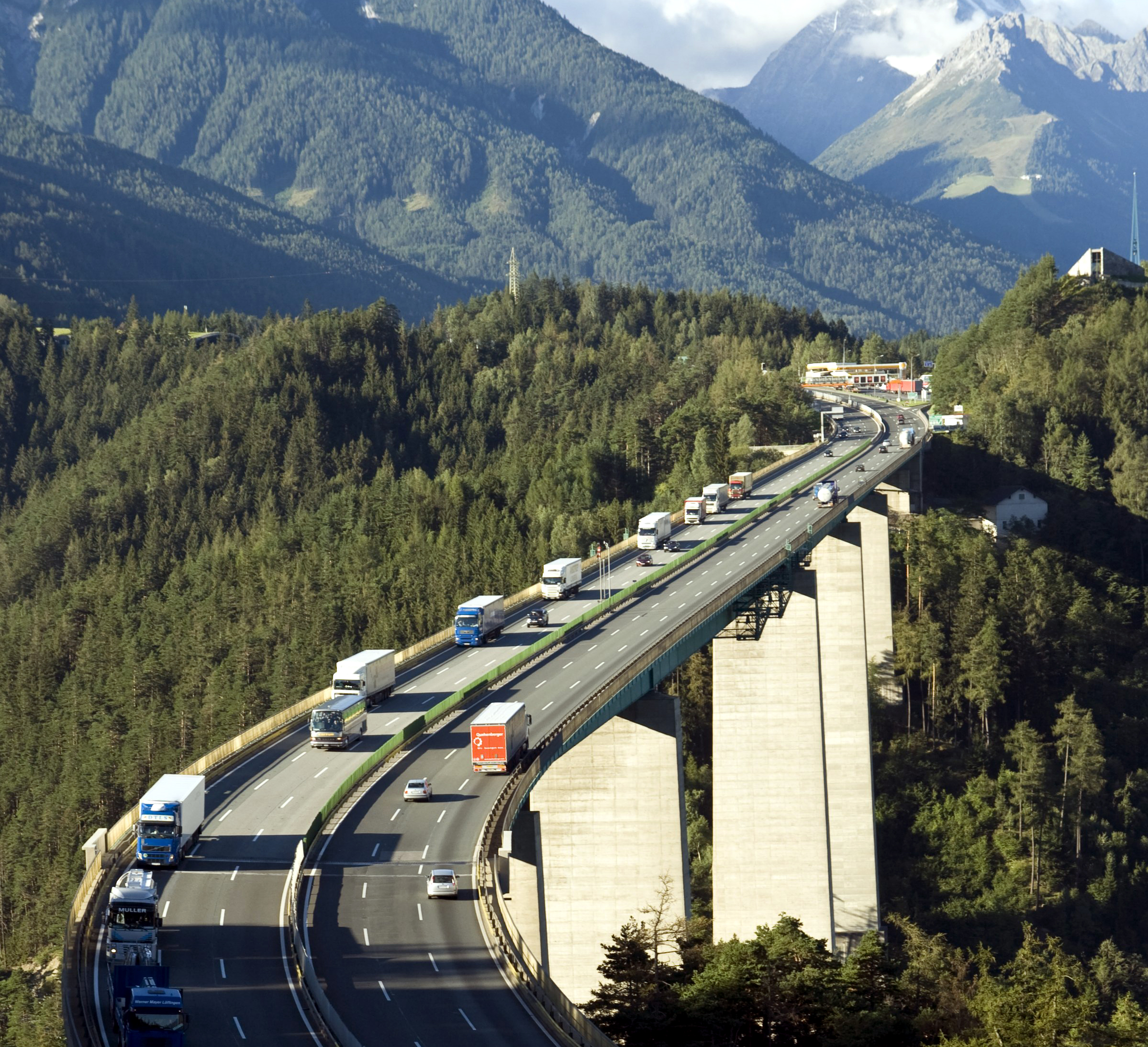
- Coordinates: 47.202222°N 11.401944°E
- Carries: 6 lanes of European route E45
- Crosses: Sill River
- Locale: Innsbruck, Tyrol (state), Austria
- Other name(s): Bridge of Europe

Characteristics
- Design: Box Girder
- Material: Steel (truss) and concrete (pillar)
- Height: 190 metres (620 ft)
- Longest span: 198 metres (650 ft)

History
- Construction start: 1959
- Construction end: 1963
- Inaugurated: 17 November 1963

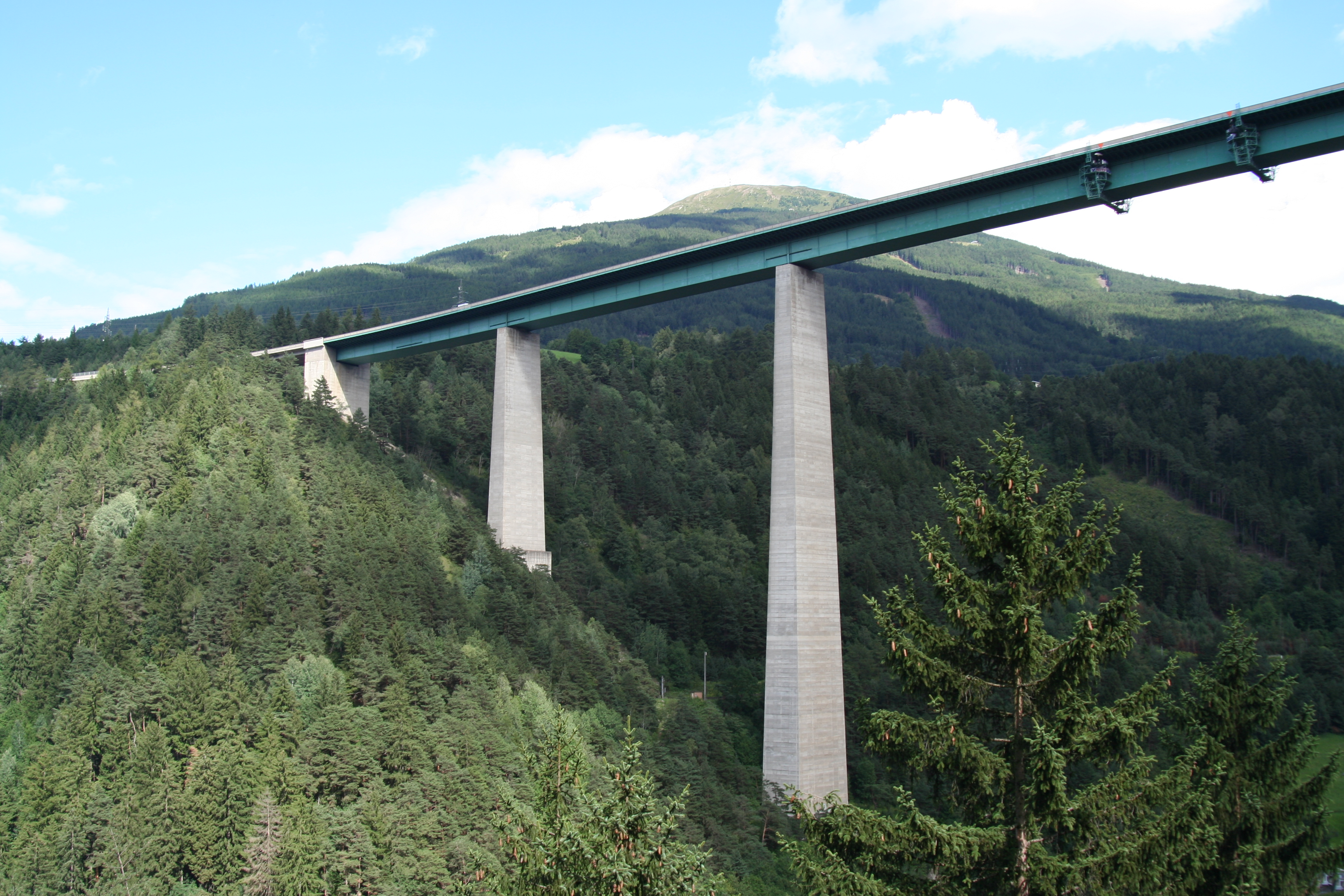

The Europa Bridge or Bridge of Europe (Europabrücke) is a 777-metre-long (2,549 ft) bridge carrying the A13 Brenner Autobahn (and European route E45) over the 657-metre (2,156 ft) Wipp valley just south of Innsbruck, Tyrol, Austria. The bridge spans the Sill River, and forms part of the main route across the Alps from western Austria to South Tyrol in Italy. It is also part of the main route between southeastern Germany and northern Italy.

The longest span between pillars is 198 metres (650 ft).

It hosts a 192-meter Bungee Jump, the fifth highest in the world.

== Record ==
Built between 1959 and 1963 and standing 190 metres (620 ft) high above the ground, it took the title of Europe's highest bridge, surpassing the Gueuroz Bridge in Switzerland. The Italia Viaduct took over this title in 1974.

== See also ==
- List of highest bridges in the world
- List of tallest bridges in the world
- List of bridges in Austria
