= Kremsbrücke Pressingberg =

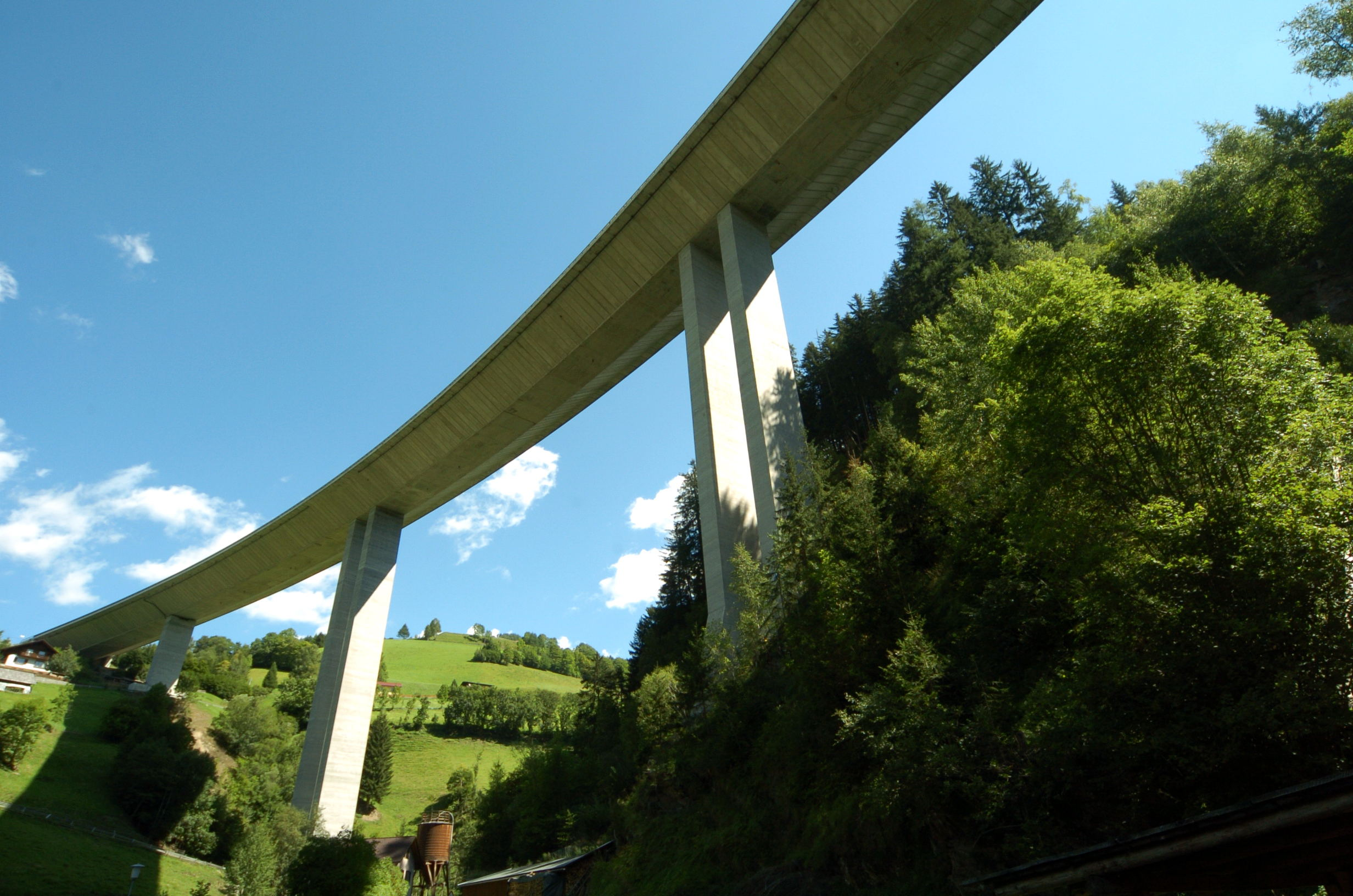
- Coordinates: 46.962°N 13.620°E
- Locale: Carinthia, Austria
- Official name: Kremsbrücke Pressingberg

Characteristics
- Material: Concrete
- Total length: 2,607 metres (8,553 ft) (Longest bridge in Austria)

History
- Construction start: 1978
- Construction end: 1980

The Kremsbrücke Pressingberg bridge is the longest bridge in Austria at 2,607 metres (8,553 ft).

The bridge is situated in Kremsbrücke, Carinthia, Austria. It is actually two cantilever truss bridges end to end (the Kremsbrücke and Pressingberg bridges). Construction took three years (1978-1980).

The bridge carries the A10 Tauern Autobahn, which connects Salzburg to Spittal, across the Krems valley. The roadway is 84 feet (25.5 m) wide, resting on a box girder 24.6 feet (7.5 m) wide and 16 feet (5 m) deep, and is divided into four traffic lanes.
