= Witwer family =

Austrian family of painters & sculptors

The Witwer family was a 16th and 17th century Austrian family of painters and sculptors, originating in Imst in Tyrol.
