= Tobadill =

- Municipality
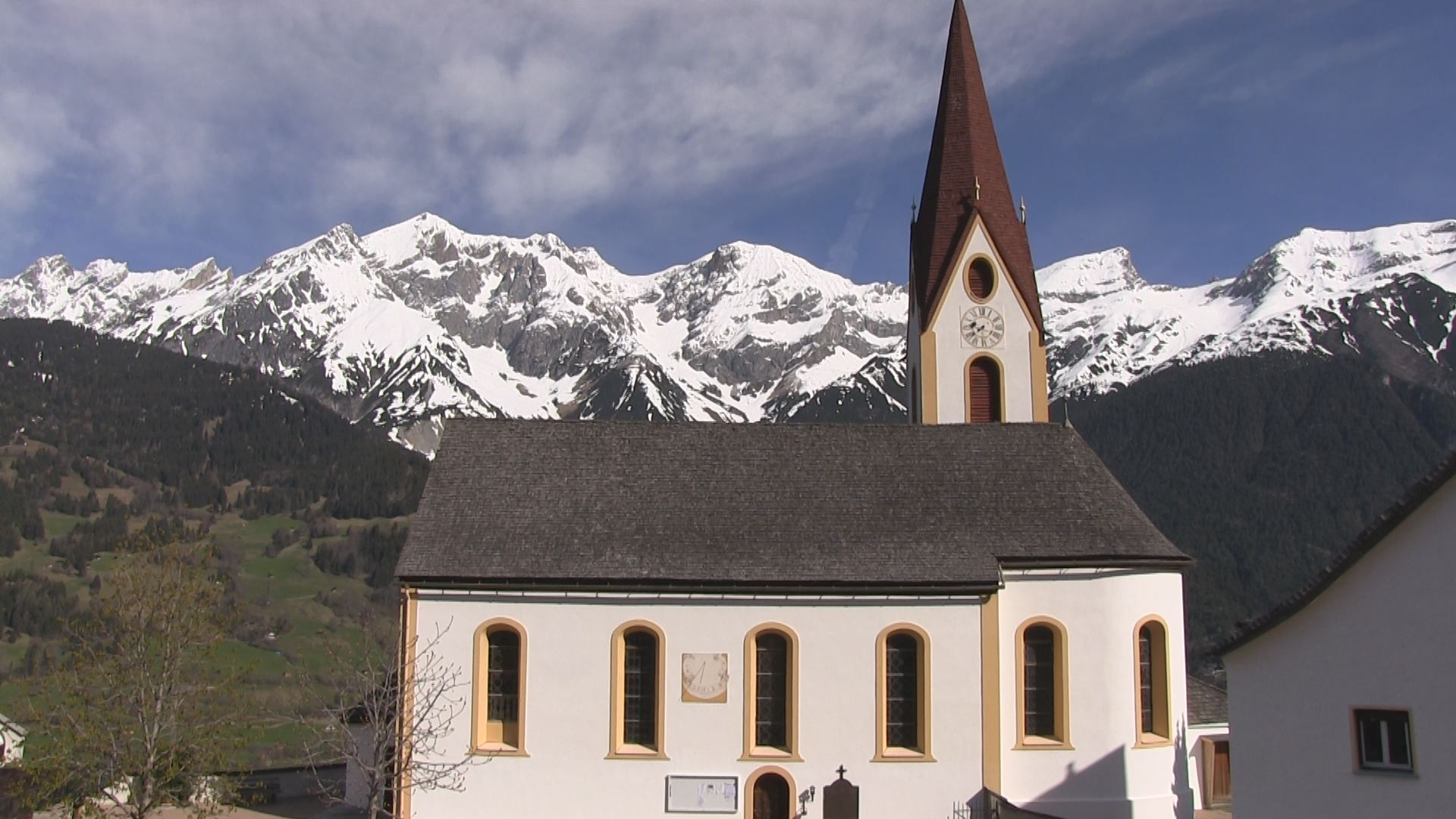
- Tobadill parish church

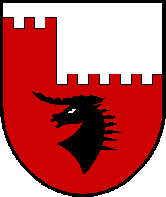
- Coat of arms

- Location within Austria
- Coordinates: 47°07′31″N 10°30′48″E
- Country: Austria
- State: Tyrol
- District: Landeck

Government
  - Mayor: Martin Auer

Area
  - Total: 16.49 km^{2} (6.37 sq mi)
- Elevation: 1,136 m (3,727 ft)

Population (2021)
  - Total: 508
  - Density: 30.8/km^{2} (79.8/sq mi)
- Time zone: UTC+1 (CET)
  - Summer (DST): UTC+2 (CEST)
- Postal code: 6551
- Area code: 05442
- Vehicle registration: LA

Tobadill is a municipality in the district of Landeck in the Austrian state of Tyrol located 4 km west of the town of Landeck.

The village was first mentioned in documents in 1275 as „tabulat ill“. Formerly a part of Pians, the village was separated as an own community in 1949.

The confluence of the rivers Rosanna (35 km, from Arlberg and Stanzertal valley) and Trisanna (35 km, from Silvretta and Paznaun) to the river Sanna (Inn) is situated here.

The main source of income is tourism, for example kayaking.
