= Finstertalspeicher =

- Location within Austria
- Location: Tyrol, Austria
- Coordinates: 47.193°N 11.026°E
- Type: reservoir

Finstertalspeicher is a reservoir in Tyrol, Austria.
