= St. Georgenberg-Fiecht Abbey =

Coordinates: 47°22′35″N 11°41′32″E

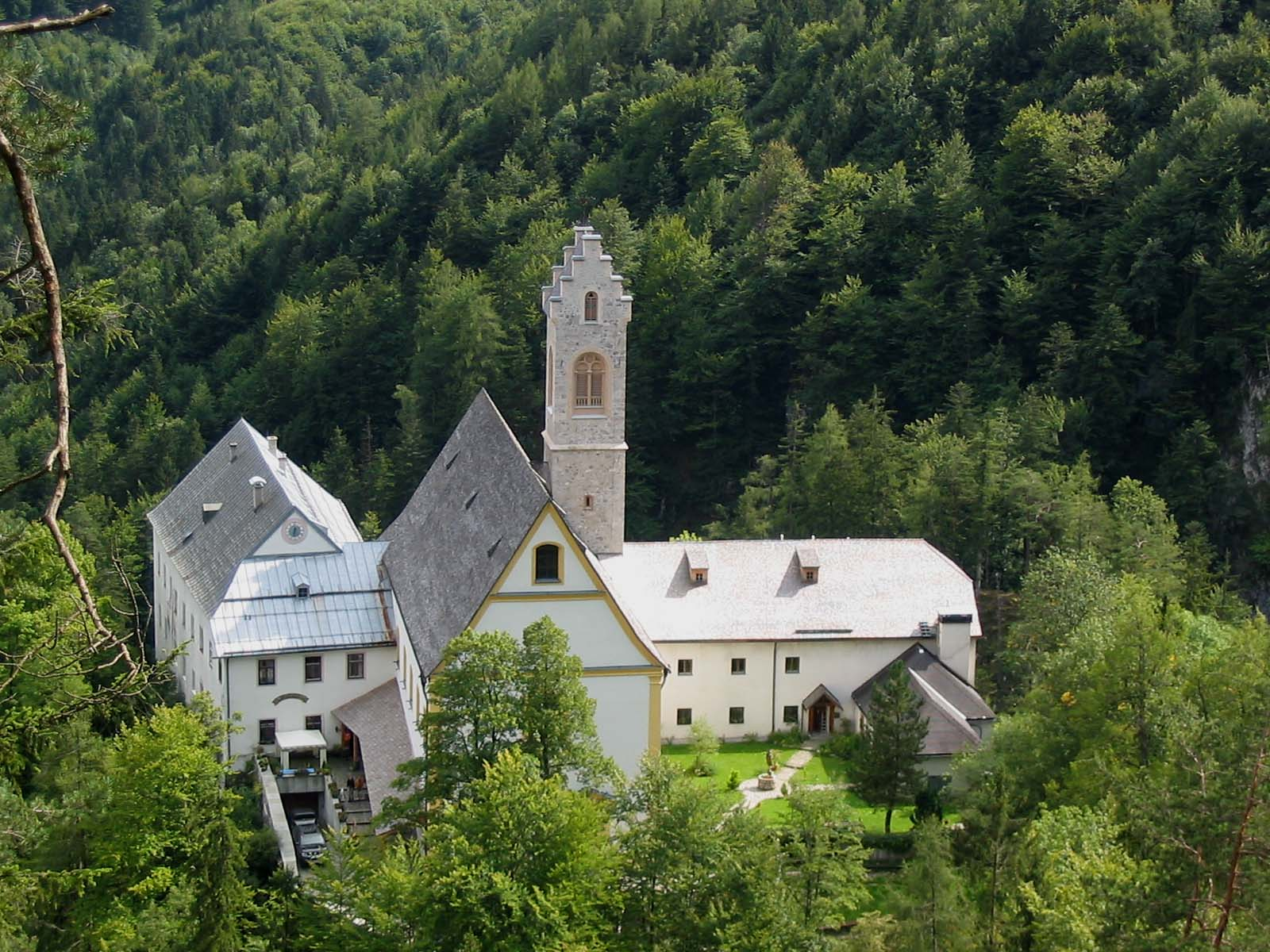
St. Georgenberg, northwest side

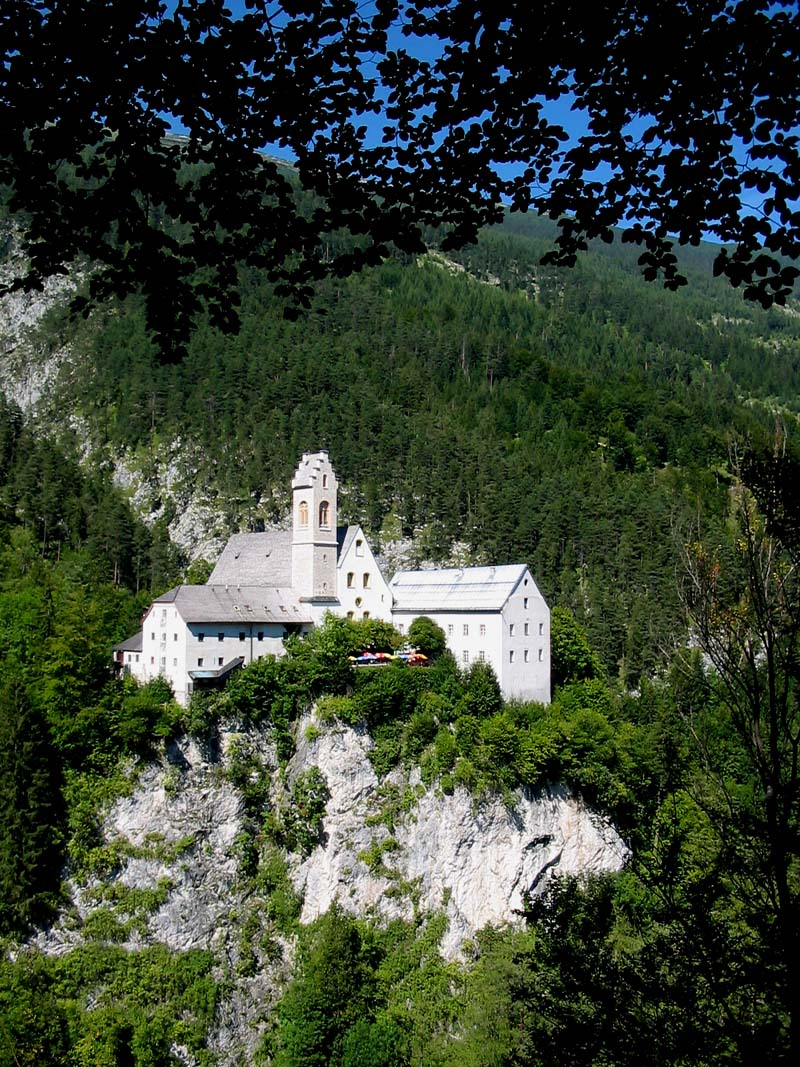
St. Georgenberg, south side

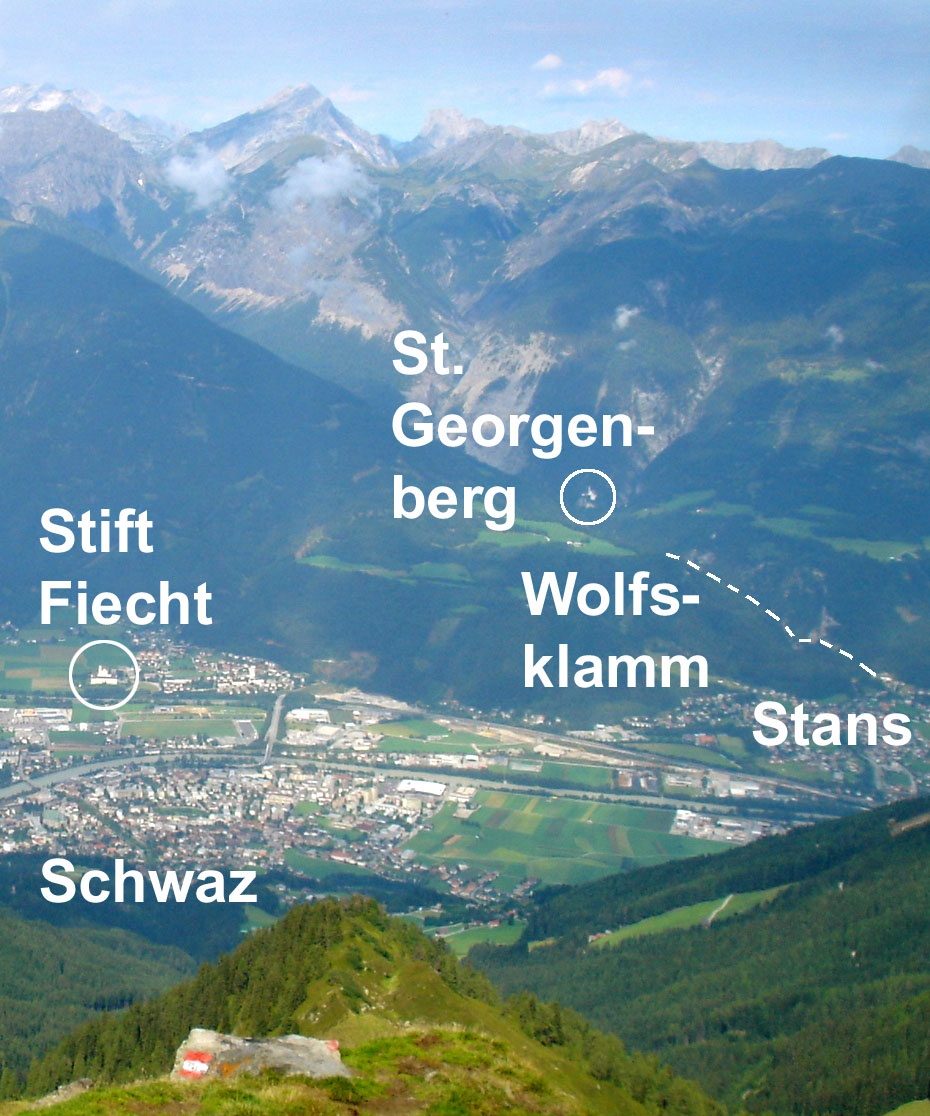
Abbey sites at Fiecht and St. Georgenberg

St. Georgenberg Abbey is a Benedictine monastery, the oldest extant monastery in the Tyrol, founded in 1138 but from 1708 to 2019 relocated to the nearby city of Fiecht in the community of Vomp in Tyrol, Austria. In 2019 the monks returned to a restored abbey at St. Georgenberg, which had remained a place of pilgrimage and spiritual retreat.

== History ==
According to tradition, the site's first use was as a hermitage in about the middle of the 10th century by Blessed Rathold (or Rapoto) of Aibling, of the ancient noble family of the Rapotonen. He established his cell on the Georgenberg ("St. George's Mount"), a rocky outcrop rising some hundred metres above the Stallental valley near Stans.

Substantial donations to the community beginning about 1000 from Albuin, Bishop of Brixen, and in 1097 from Emperor Henry IV suggest that by that time there was already a well-established monastery here rather than a simple hermitage.

The religious community at St. Georgenberg was turned into a Benedictine abbey in 1138 by Reginbert, Bishop of Brixen; the papal charter of confirmation is dated 30 April 1138.

On 31 October 1705 there occurred the fourth in a series of disastrous fires which ruined all the buildings, and the abbey was moved to a new site at Fiecht in the Inn valley. It became operative there in 1708.

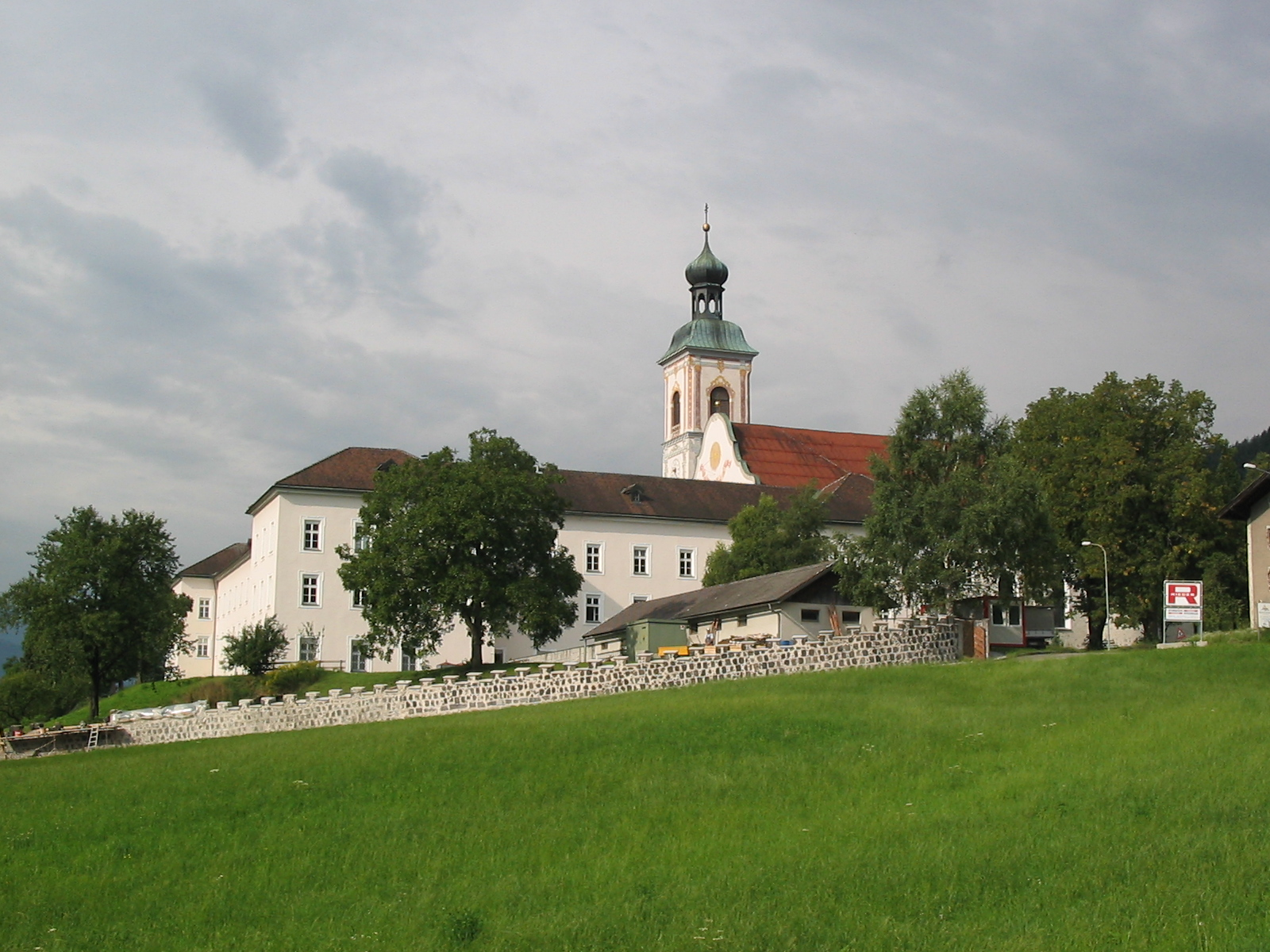
Fiecht Abbey

== Move from St. Georgenberg to Fiecht ==
Because of lack of funds, however, the new conventual buildings and church at Fiecht Abbey (begun in 1741 and finished in 1750; its tower was finished as late as 1781) were uniquely modest in their construction, but for that very reason are the more impressive as examples of Baroque architecture. Only the inside of the church and the trompe-l'œil façade were finished in the typical style of the era: stuccoists of the Wessobrunn School, such as Franz Xaver Feuchtmayer the Elder and his brother Michael, the frescoist Matthäus Günther and other renowned sculptors from the Tyrol and elsewhere were engaged for these parts of the construction, visible only from the monastic buildings,

After the Treaty of Pressburg in 1806 the Tyrol passed from Austria to Bavaria and Fiecht Abbey was suppressed by the Bavarian government in 1807, but restored in 1816 when the Tyrol was restored to Austria. It suffered from another serious fire in 1868 which ruined most of the collection of graphic art, but spared most of the library.

Between 1941 and 1945 the abbey was impounded by the Gestapo and the monks were exiled, to return after the end of World War II.

After 1967 the abbey became a member of the Ottilien Congregation (Missionary Benedictines) of the Benedictine Confederation.

== Move from Fiecht back to St. Georgenberg ==
In June 2016, the nine monks remaining in the monastery in Fiecht determined to move up the valley to the craggy site of St. Georgenberg, which had remained a popular place of pilgrimage and reflection, and which had been their monastery from the 11th to the 18th century. Fiecht was sold on 28 June 2018 as renovations proceeded on their mountain home. In the Summer of 2019 the monks returned to St. Georgenberg,

== Pilgrimage churches on the Georgenberg ==
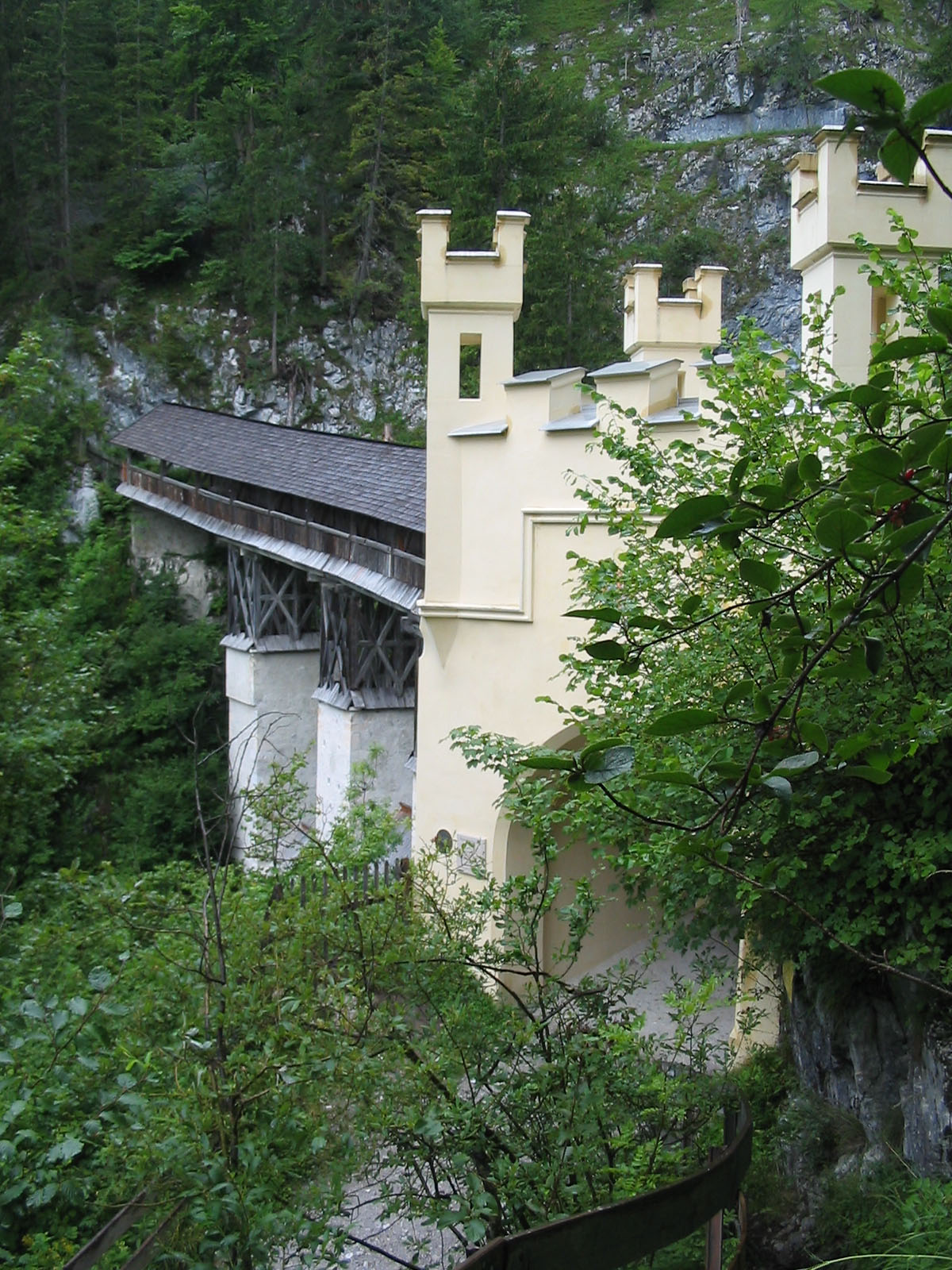
St, Georgenberg Bridge

Pilgrimages here began around 1100 and increased after the "blood miracle" that is reported to have happened in about 1310. The main objects of veneration are Saint George, a Gothic Pietà sculpture from about 1415 and the reliquary of the Holy Blood. The present Baroque church, dedicated to Saints George and James, was built after the 1705 fire on the site and to the approximate ground plan of the old church. St. Georgenberg remained a place of pilgrimage even after the monks moved to the city in the valley below. The new building was finished in 1735, with further alterations in 1863 (frescoes) and 1866.

The Lindenkirche, a small church dedicated to Saint Mary, existed as a stone building from about 1230 and housed the Pietà until it was transferred to the larger rebuilt church of Saints George and James in 1736. Major changes to the building were made in 1759 and 1882, but its Romanesque porch is still intact.

To provide access to the monastery without strenuous climbing, a bridge was constructed by the 15th century, and restored by 1709, after the great fire. Its name is the Hohe Brücke ("high bridge"). When walking up from Stans, however, many pilgrims still take the route that leads through the romantic Wolfsklamm gorge.
