= Stans, Tyrol =

Stans
- Municipality
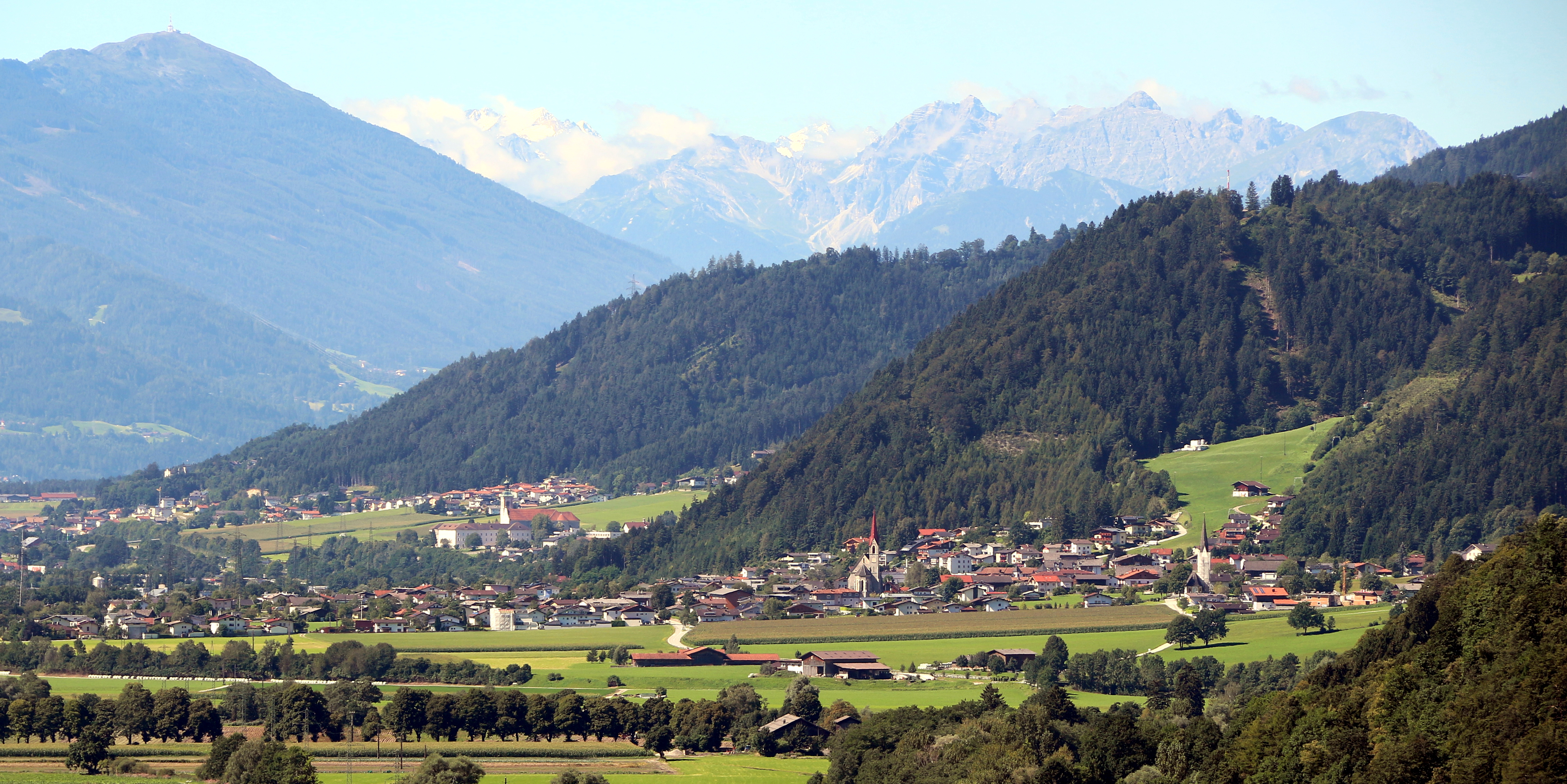

- Coat of arms

- Location within Austria
- Coordinates: 47°22′08″N 11°43′08″E
- Country: Austria
- State: Tyrol
- District: Schwaz

Government
  - Mayor: Josef Mayr

Area
  - Total: 20.06 km^{2} (7.75 sq mi)
- Elevation: 563 m (1,847 ft)

Population (2021)
  - Total: 2,159
  - Density: 107.6/km^{2} (278.8/sq mi)
- Time zone: UTC+1 (CET)
  - Summer (DST): UTC+2 (CEST)
- Postal code: 6135
- Area code: 05242
- Vehicle registration: SZ
- Website: www.stans.tirol.gv.at

Stans is a municipality in the Schwaz district in the Austrian state of Tyrol. It is located in the Inn valley, some 3 km away from Schwaz. Adolf Darbo, a food company, has been based here since 1918.

== Gallery ==
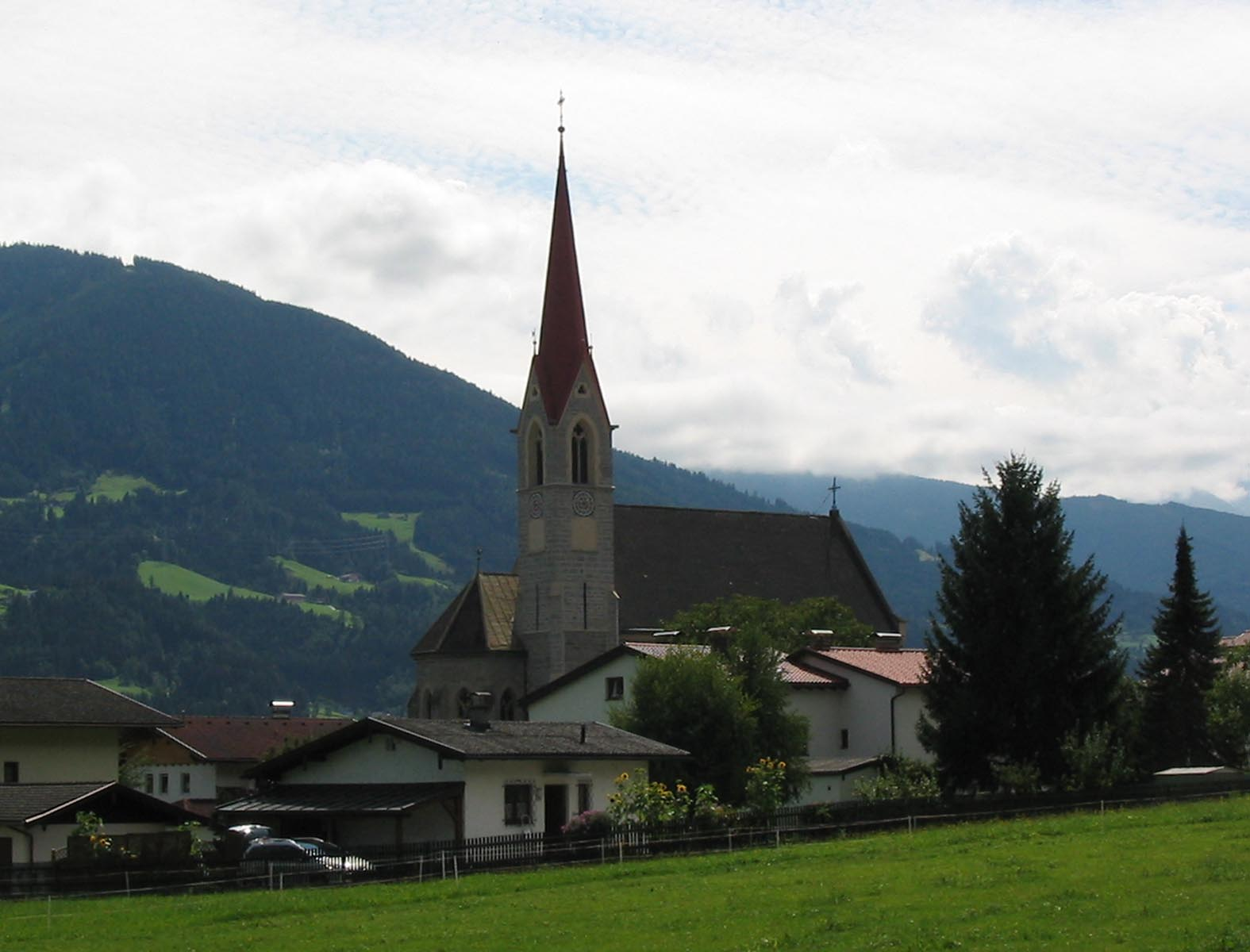
The Herz Jesu church (19th century)

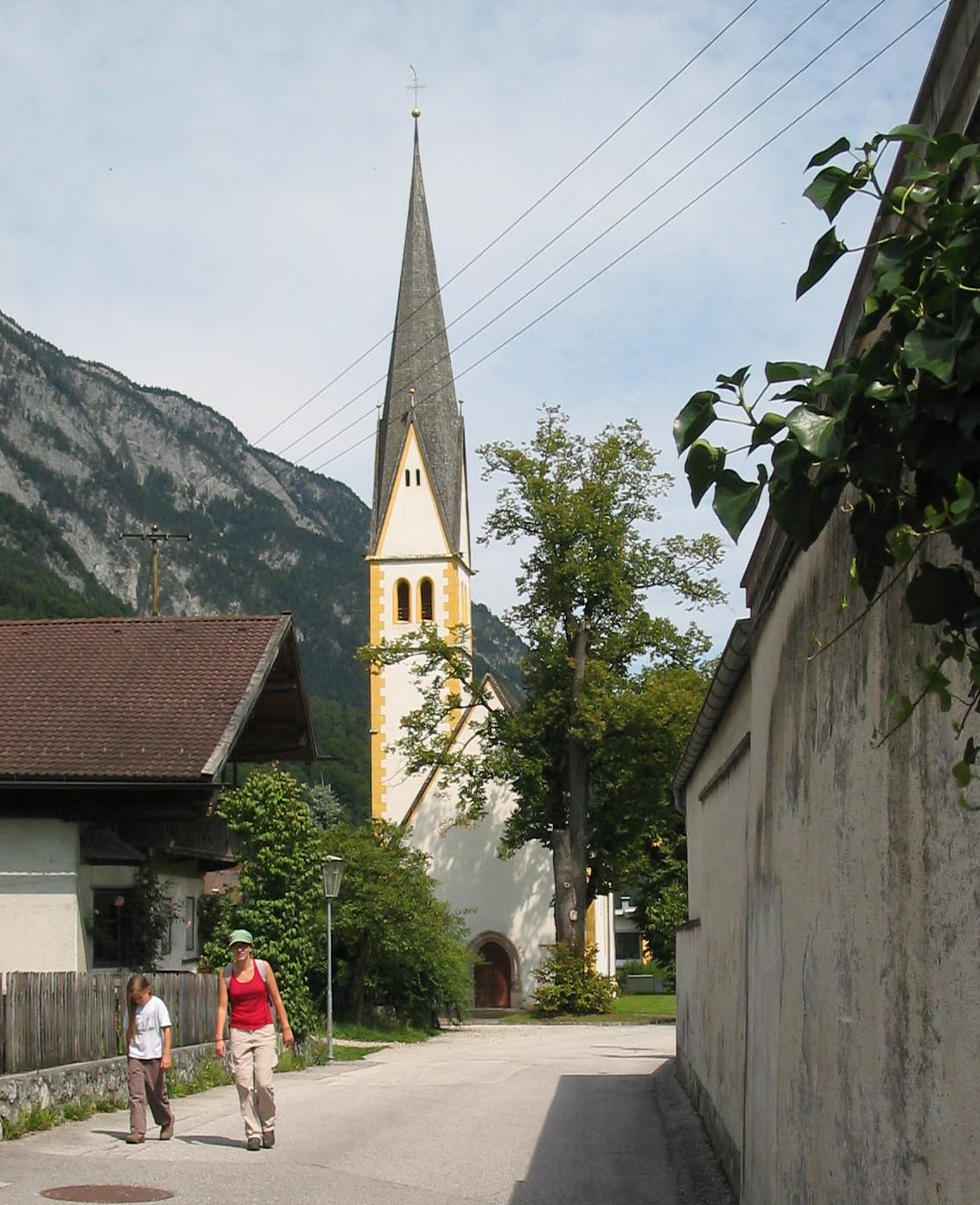
The old church of St. Laurence

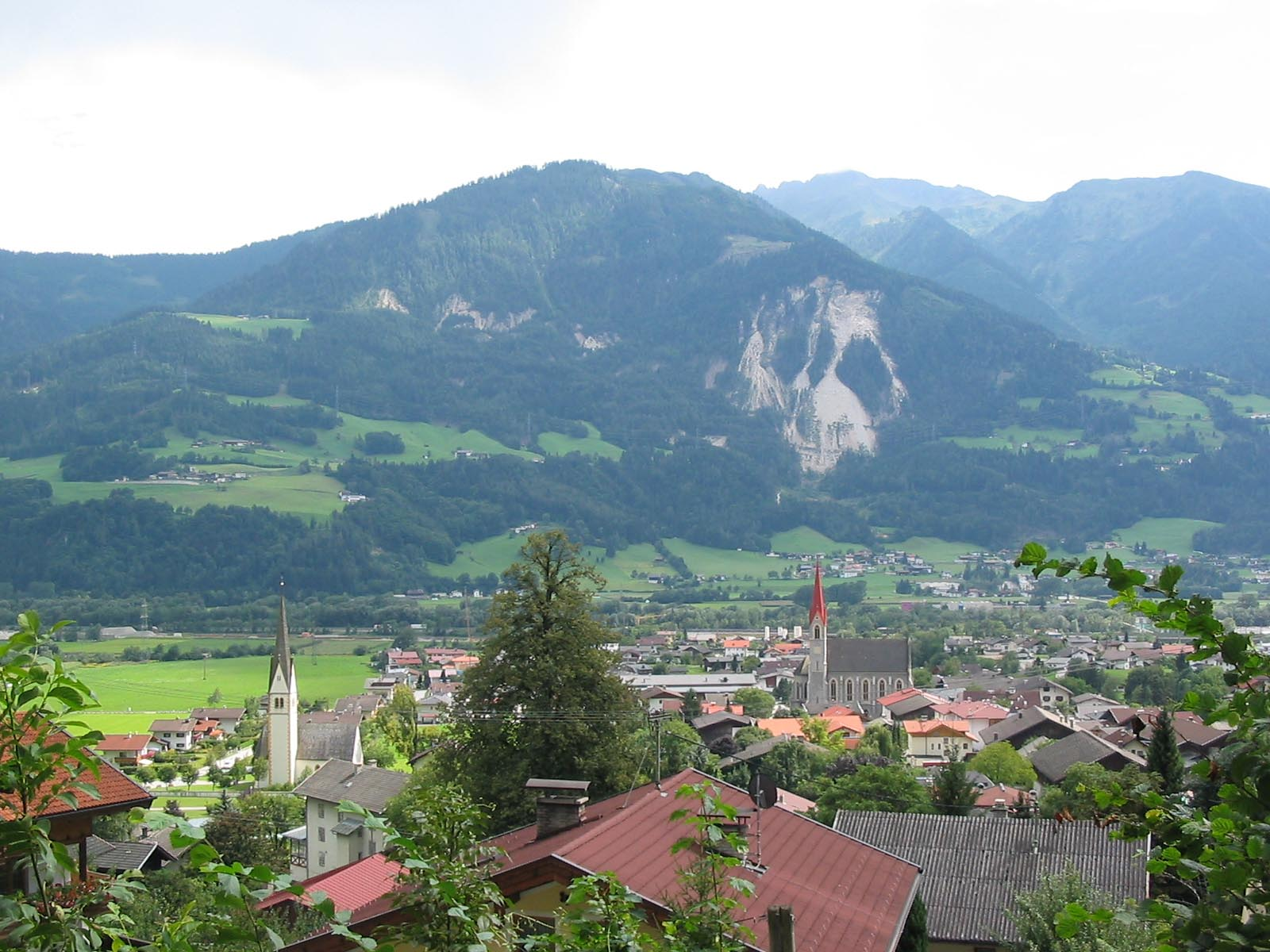
St. Laurence's church (left) with the Herz Jesu church, and Eiblschrofen in the background

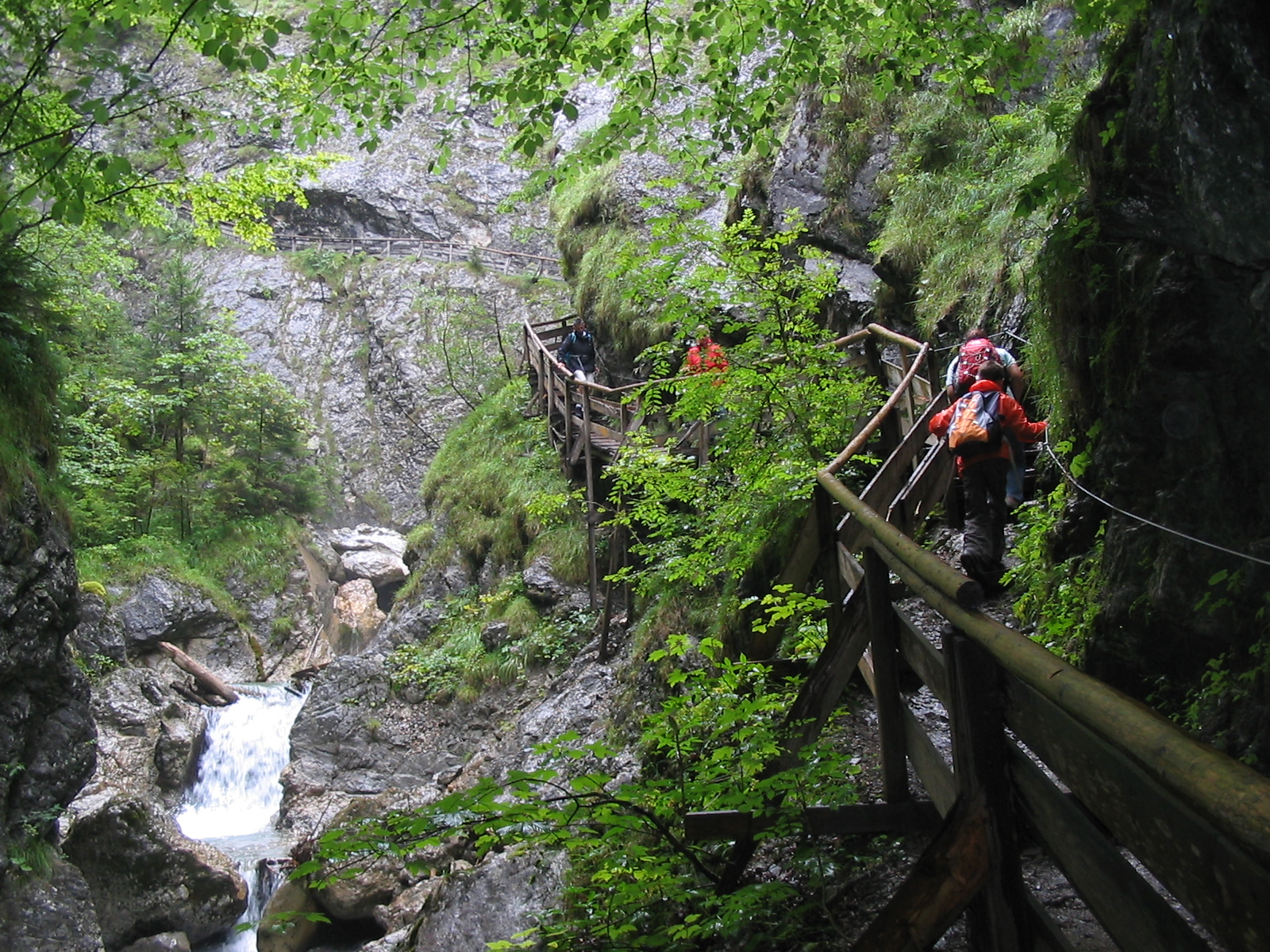
Wolfsklamm gorge, from Stans to the Georgenberg
