= Highline179 =

Longest suspended pedestrian bridge

highline179
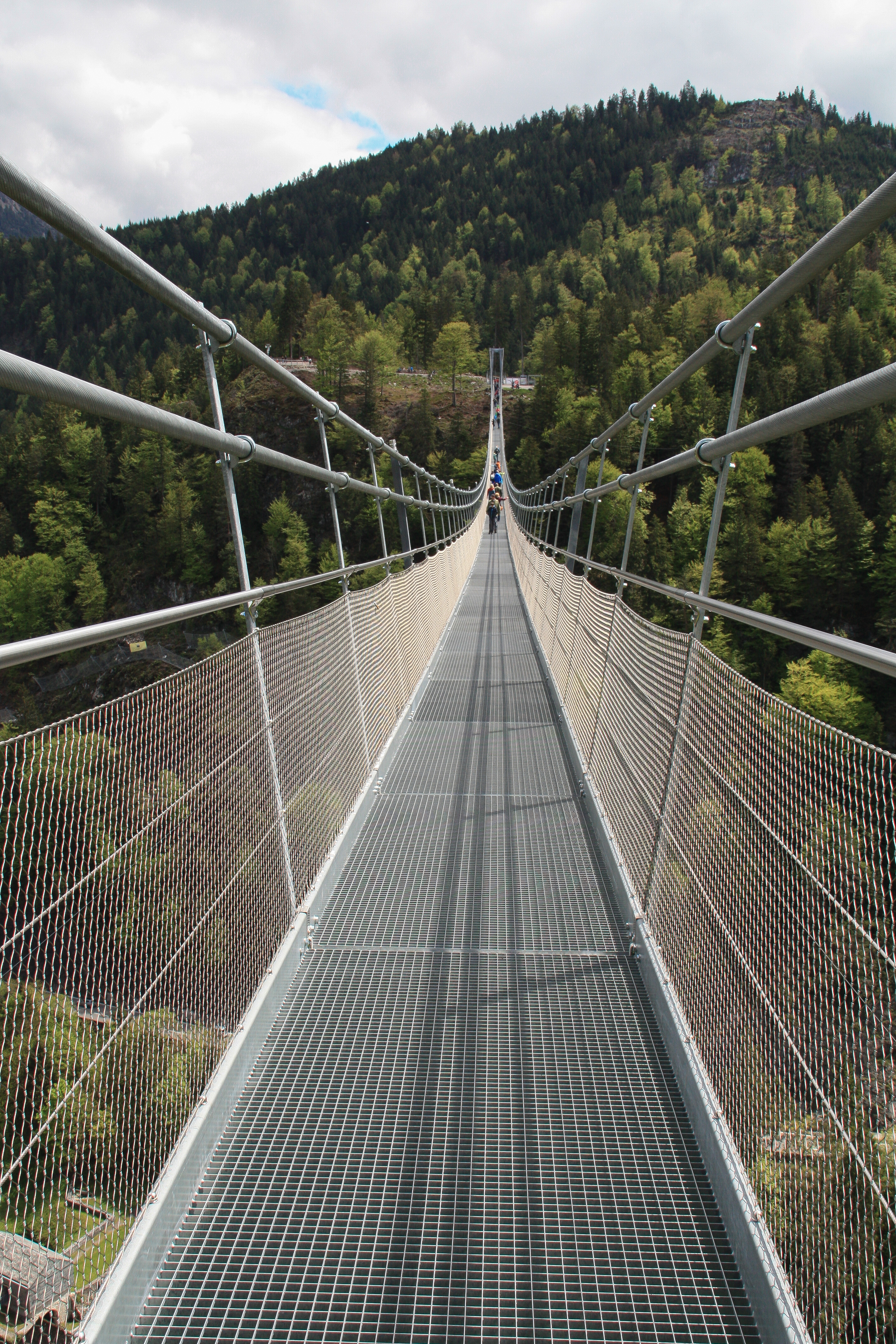
- View across the bridge span
- Coordinates: 47.465372°N 10.717752°E
- Carries: Pedestrians
- Locale: Reutte
- Website: www.highline179.com/en/

Characteristics
- Design: Suspension bridge
- Total length: 406 metres (1,332 ft)
- Width: 1.2 metres (3 ft 11 in)
- Height: 114.60 metres (376.0 ft)
- Load limit: 500 people

Location
- Interactive map of highline179

The highline179 is a pedestrian suspension bridge located near Reutte in Tyrol, Austria, close to the Bavarian border. It extends at an altitude of 114 meters (374 ft) above the namesake B179 road, spanning the valley connecting the Ehrenberg Castle ruins with Fort Claudia. The location of the bridge was chosen so that it would have a span of 403 metres (1,322 ft).

== Construction ==
The 1.20 meters (3.9 ft) wide pedestrian bridge consists of grating, which rests on crossbars that are attached to the four support cables by vertical hangers. The support cables have a diameter of 60 millimeters (2.4 in). A handrail is mounted 1.35 meters (4.4 ft) above both sides of the tread, which is connected to the grate through a wire mesh lattice. The supporting ropes are fastened on both sides of the bridge with a total of 16 anchors which extend into the rock to a depth of 17 meters (56 ft). The weight of the bridge is about 70 short tons (64 t).

One end of the bridge is 9.85 m (32.3 ft) higher than the other end. The bridge sags by 17 m (56 ft) in relation to an imaginary straight line between the two ends, and the sagging can increase by about 1 metre (3.28 ft) depending on the load and the temperature. The load bearing capacity is 1000 people, but for safety reasons only 500 people can be on the bridge at the same time, which is ensured by turnstiles at both ends. An entrance fee is charged for the use of the privately financed bridge, which is absorbed by the municipality in case of a minimum use.

== History ==
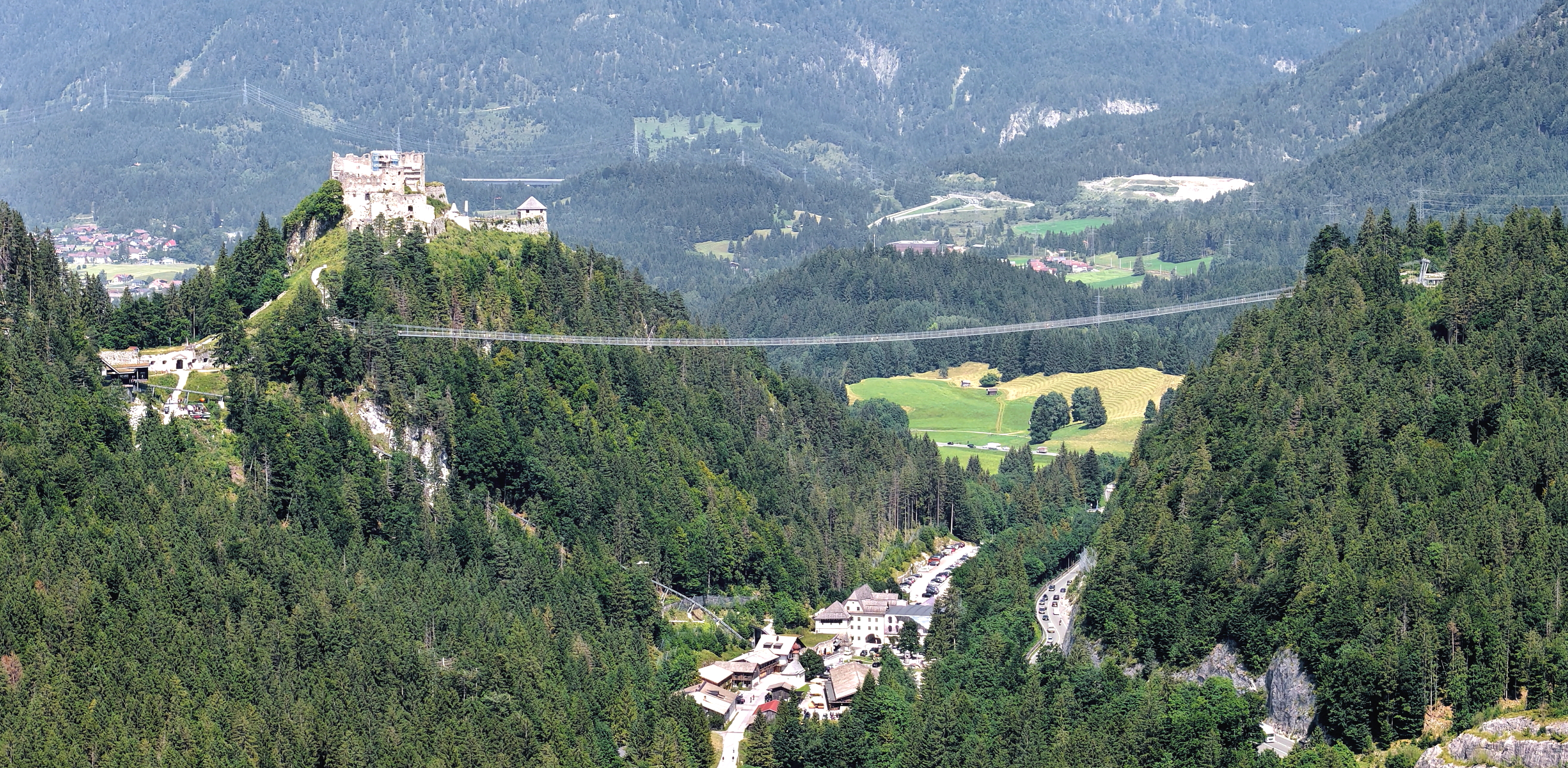
Highline179 with Ehrenberg Castle

In the spring of 2012, the planning of the Hängebrücke Ehrenberg was made after the building permit was granted. The goal was the construction of the world's longest rope-hanging bridge, with a length of about 406 metres (1,332 ft). The idea came from Maximilian Huttenloher (1952–2009) and was built under architect Armin Walch, who was also involved in the planning of the Hängebrücke Holzgau.

At the beginning of 2013, an investor was found for the project. The market township of Reutte, the European Burmese Museum Ehrenberg and the TVB Nature Park Region of Reutte signed the contract as the basis for the construction and operation of the Hängebrücke.

Start of construction for the highline179 was in April 2014, and at the beginning of May the groundbreaking started. To protect the trunk road to be crossed, a protective scaffold with switchboards was installed over a length of 20 metres (65.6 ft).

On October 29, 2014, the bridge was closed nine days after the last cable pull. The opening was scheduled for October 10, 2014 and was postponed to November 22, 2014 as a result of delays.

After a thorough examination, the highline179 was included in the Guinness Book of Records as the "longest pedestrian bridge in the Tibet style". The Guinness World Records Certificate confirmed "The longest Tibet-style footbridge is a catenary-shaped walkway" which brought the distinction to the now opened, approximately 440 m-long (1,440 ft) bridge in the Skypark of Sochi, which is constructed differently with fixed walkways suspended under a tension belt.
