= Sanna (Inn) =

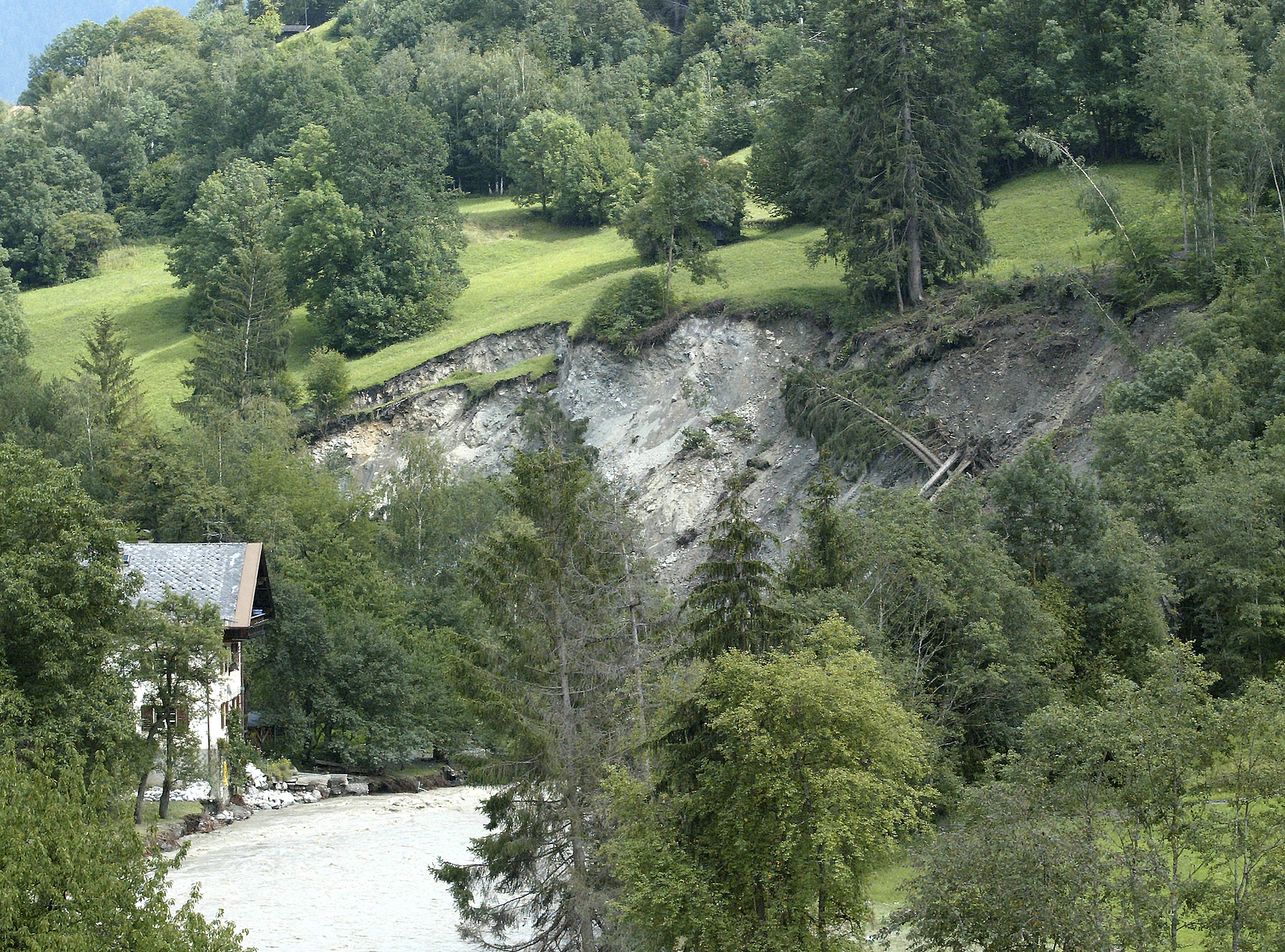
- Landslide above Sanna in 2005

Location
- Country: Austria
- State: Tyrol

Physical characteristics
- Source
  - location: confluence of Rosanna and Trisanna
- Mouth
  - location: Inn
  - coordinates: 47.1439°N 10.5646°E
- Length: 7.1 km (4.4 mi)
- Basin size: 727 km^{2} (281 sq mi)

Basin features
- Progression: Inn→ Danube→ Black Sea

The Sanna is a river of Tyrol, Austria, a left tributary of the Inn.

The Sanna is formed near Tobadill by the confluence of the rivers Rosanna (42 km (26 mi), from Arlberg and the valley Stanzertal) and Trisanna (31 km (19 mi), from Silvretta and Paznaun). It flows into the Inn at the small town of Landeck. It is 7.1 kilometres (4.4 mi) long. Its basin area is 727 km^{2} (281 sq mi). The villages Pians and Grins are situated at its waterfront.

The whitewater river is used for kayaking and was the site of the 1996 world championships.
