= Ost Autobahn =

Road in Austria

Motorway A4
- Ost Autobahn A4

Route information
- Length: 66 km (41 mi)

Major junctions
- From: Vienna Erdberg
- Prater Junction A 4 / A 23; Simmeringer Haide (B 228); Albern Junction A 4 / A 22 (planned); Schwechat Junction A 4 / S 1; Airport (B 9); Fischamend (B 9); Bruck an der Leitha-West (B10); Bruck an der Leitha-Ost (B211); Bruckneudorf Junction A 4 / A 6; Parndorf (B10); Neusiedl am See (B50); Gols/Weiden (B51); Mönchhof (B51); Nickelsdorf (B10)
- To: M1 / E60, Hungary

Location
- Country: Austria
- Regions: Vienna, Lower Austria, Burgenland

Highway system
- Highways of Austria; Autobahns; Expressways; State Roads
← A 3	→ A 5

The (Austrian) Ost Autobahn A4 or "Eastern Motorway" is part of the European route E60 and goes from Vienna to the town of Nickelsdorf, on the Hungarian border.

The road begins at the A23 at the Prater junction in Vienna, travels through Simmering, Schwechat, Vienna International Airport, Fischamend, Bruck an der Leitha, Parndorf, Weiden am See and Mönchhof to the border town of Nickelsdorf. Crossing the border into Hegyeshalom, the road becomes the Hungarian M1 motorway which then continues on to Budapest. The road is 66 km long.

== Future plans ==
There is a new junction planned at Albern, as part of the lengthening of the Donauuferautobahn A22, which in the future should be extended into a so-called Halbknoten or half-junction. This would mean, for instance, that it would only be possible to go from Schwechat onto the A22, meaning one would have to travel from the A22 to the A4, in the direction of Schwechat. In the future there are plans to connect the six-lane extension between the Schwechat junction and the airport.

The section from Vienna to Vienna International Airport will be called the Flughafenautobahn, or "Airport Motorway". As of 2014, there are plans to widen the A4 from 2x2 to 2x3 lanes between Vienna International Airport and Fischamend at a cost of 32 million euro.

A4 border
