= Pama, Austria =

Pama
- Municipality
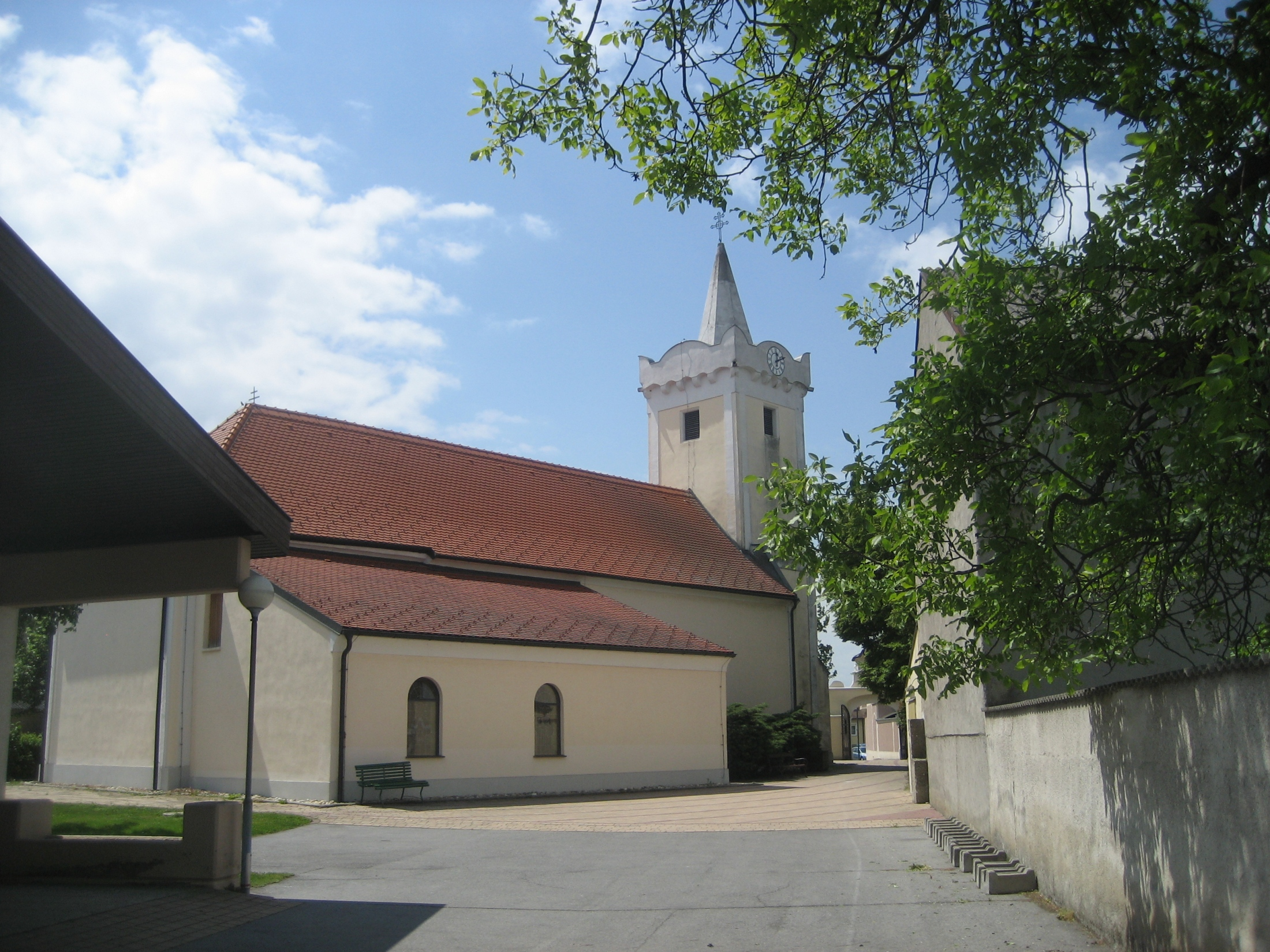
- All Saints' Church

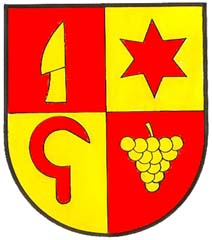
- Coat of arms

- Location within Austria
- Coordinates: 48°2′N 17°1′E
- Country: Austria
- State: Burgenland
- District: Neusiedl am See

Government
  - Mayor: Manfred Bugnyar (SPÖ)

Area
  - Total: 26.4 km^{2} (10.2 sq mi)
- Elevation: 137 m (449 ft)

Population (2018-01-01)
  - Total: 1,204
  - Density: 45.6/km^{2} (118/sq mi)
- Time zone: UTC+1 (CET)
  - Summer (DST): UTC+2 (CEST)
- Postal code: 2422
- Vehicle registration: ND
- Website: www.gemeinde-pama.at

Pama (German pronunciation: [ˈpaːma]; Hungarian: Lajtakörtvélyes, Croatian: Bijelo Selo) is a town in the district of Neusiedl am See in the Austrian state of Burgenland.

== Geography ==
Pama borders on Kittsee in the north, Gattendorf and Zurndorf in the south, Deutsch Jahrndorf in the southeast, Lower Austria in the west and Slovakia in the east.

The non-populated area is used for agriculture. There are barely any woods.

== History ==
After the Ottoman wars, the strongly decimated population was supplemented by the influx of Croatian-speaking population. The Burgenland Croats have shrunk noticeably in recent decades, but are still very active in community life. The majority of church services are held mainly in Croatian. The town belonged to Hungary (German-Western Hungary) until the foundation of Burgenland in 1920/21.

Before the Second World War, Jewish families lived in Pama, as well as in Kittsee, the neighboring town that was part of the seven Jewish communities in Burgenland. After the "Anschluss" of Austria to the National Socialist German Reich, the Jews living in Kittsee and Pama were expelled from their homes on 16 April 1938 and abandoned on a lonely island on the Danube.

== Population ==
Historical population
Year	Pop.	±%
1869	856	—
1880	974	+13.8%
1890	902	−7.4%
1900	894	−0.9%
1910	1,045	+16.9%
1923	1,090	+4.3%
1934	1,170	+7.3%
1939	1,153	−1.5%
1951	1,198	+3.9%
1961	966	−19.4%
1971	981	+1.6%
1981	915	−6.7%
1991	977	+6.8%
2001	1,005	+2.9%
2011	1,073	+6.8%

== Culture and landmarks ==
- Catholic Church Pama
- Piety column, Maria Immaculata
- Graveyard portal
- Piety column, white cross

=== Leisure and sports ===
- Horse riding: The landscape is perfect for horse riding.
- Cycling: There is an extensive cycling network
- Football: The town has two football grounds.
- Tennis court
- Beach volleyball court
- Ice skating: A former fire pond is used as an ice rink by children during the winter months.
- Gym

=== Associations ===
- SK Pama (football team)
- UFC Pama (football team)
- Vfb Energy Pama (sports club)
- Tennisclub TC Pama
- Fishing club
- Landjugend
- Pensionistenverband
- Seniorenbund
- Naturfreunde
- Jugend von Pama
- Tamburica Bijelo Selo

== Politics ==
The municipal council has a total of 19 members. The Social Democratic Party of Austria has 10 councillors, the Austrian People's Party 9.

Mayor is Manfred Bugnyar (SPÖ), who succeeded Josef Wetzelhofer (SPÖ) in March 2017, who led the community for 15 years. Bugnyar won the direct mayoral election with 55.74% against Hans-Jürgen Werdenich (ÖVP), who reached 44.26% and is now vice-mayor.

The head of the office is Josef Werdenich.
