= Neusiedl am See =

- Municipality
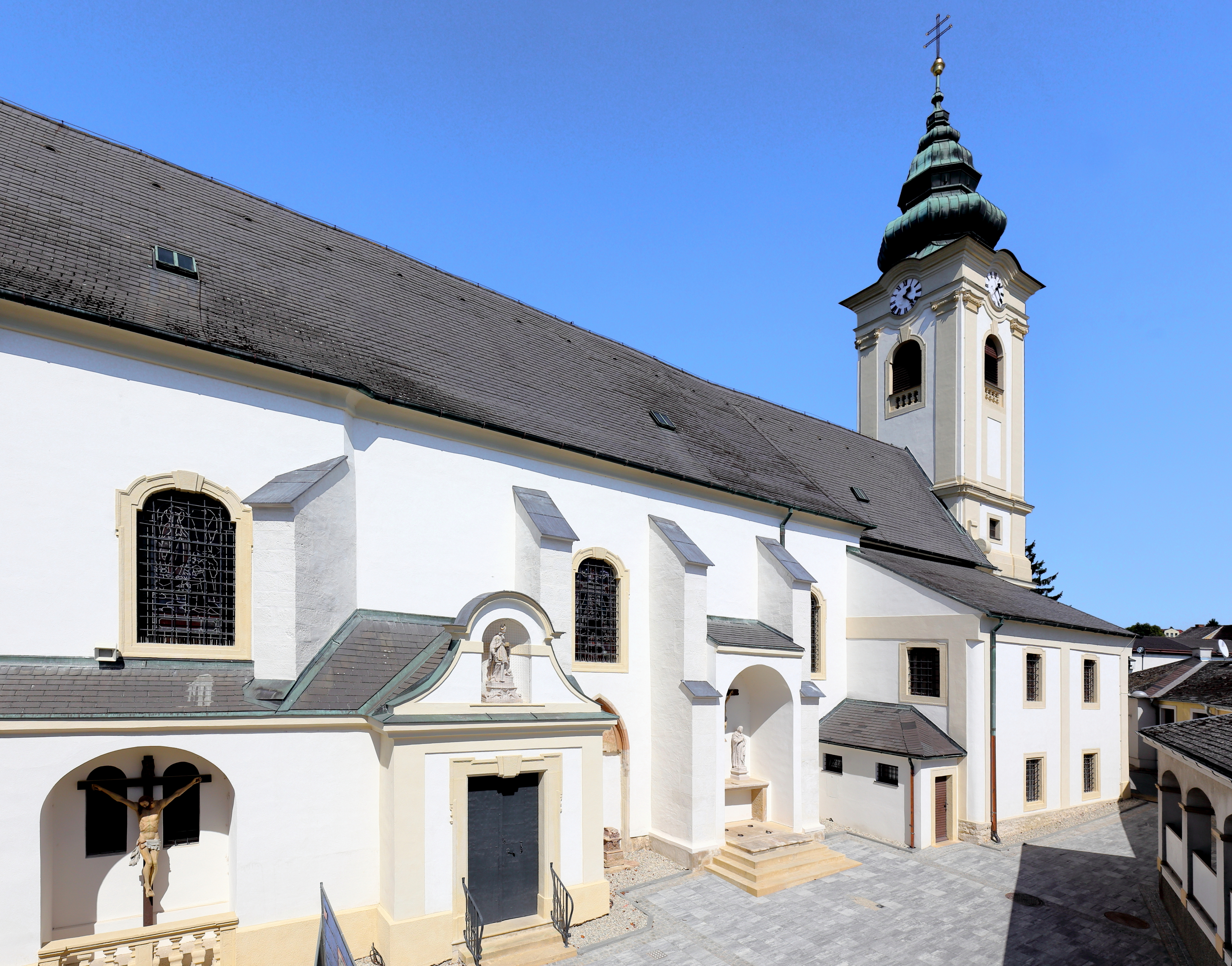
- Church of Saints Nicholas and Gall

- Coat of arms

- Location within Austria Neusiedl am See (Austria)
- Coordinates: 47°57′N 16°51′E
- Country: Austria
- State: Burgenland
- District: Neusiedl am See

Government
  - Mayor: Elisabeth Böhm (SPÖ)

Area
  - Total: 57.03 km^{2} (22.02 sq mi)
- Elevation: 133 m (436 ft)

Population (2024-01-01)
  - Total: 8,961
  - Density: 157.1/km^{2} (407.0/sq mi)
- Time zone: UTC+1 (CET)
  - Summer (DST): UTC+2 (CEST)
- Postal code: 7100
- Website: www.neusiedlamsee.at

Neusiedl am See (Austrian German: [ˈnɔʏˌsiːdl̩ am ˈseː]; Czech: Nezider; Croatian: Niuzalj; Hungarian: Nezsider; Slovak: Nezider) is a town in Burgenland, Austria, and administrative center of the district of Neusiedl am See.

Neusiedl am See is located on the northern shore of Lake Neusiedl.

== Geography ==
Neusiedl am See is located in eastern Austria, in the state of Burgenland. It is located approximately 56 kilometers southeast of Vienna. The town covers an area of 56.99 km². Positioned on the northern shore of Lake Neusiedl, the largest endorheic lake in Central Europe, Neusiedl am See is part of a region characterized by a unique lakescape at the boundary between the Alps, Carpathians, and the Pannonian Basin. The town borders Weiden am See to the south, Parndorf to the north, and Jois to the west.

== History ==
The first documented mention of "Sumbotheil" (referring to its right to hold Saturday markets) dates back to 1209. In the mid-13th century, the settlement was destroyed by the Mongols and was resettled around 1282 under the name "Niusidel." In 1517, Neusiedl was granted market rights. Neusiedl was ravaged in 1683 during the Second Turkish Siege and again in 1708 by the Kuruc rebels. In 1926, Neusiedl am See was granted town status.

Like the rest of Burgenland, the town was part of the Kingdom of Hungary (known as German West Hungary) until 1920/21. After the end of World War I, following lengthy negotiations, German West Hungary was awarded to Austria through the Treaties of Saint-Germain and Trianon in 1919. Since 1921, the town has been part of the newly founded Austrian state of Burgenland.

Until their expulsion in March 1938, around thirty Jews lived in Neusiedl. Only one Jewish resident, the textile merchant Emmerich Benkö – who survived six concentration camps and the death march – returned to Neusiedl in 1945. He was able to recover part of his family’s property and, despite severe health damage, rebuild his business. Between July 1944 and April 1945, Hungarian Jews, including women and children, were used as forced laborers in a brick factory. A total of 41 people were murdered by the Nazis: 24 Jews, 13 victims of euthanasia, and 4 Roma.

== Climate ==
Climate data for Neusiedl am See (1981–2010)
Month	Jan	Feb	Mar	Apr	May	Jun	Jul	Aug	Sep	Oct	Nov	Dec	Year
Record high °C (°F)	19.2 (66.6)	19.7 (67.5)	25.2 (77.4)	27.9 (82.2)	33.8 (92.8)	36.3 (97.3)	39.0 (102.2)	38.5 (101.3)	33.0 (91.4)	28.8 (83.8)	21.4 (70.5)	17.4 (63.3)	39.0 (102.2)
Mean daily maximum °C (°F)	2.9 (37.2)	5.3 (41.5)	10.5 (50.9)	16.6 (61.9)	21.8 (71.2)	24.8 (76.6)	27.3 (81.1)	26.7 (80.1)	21.4 (70.5)	15.4 (59.7)	8.4 (47.1)	3.5 (38.3)	15.4 (59.7)
Daily mean °C (°F)	−0.2 (31.6)	1.5 (34.7)	5.8 (42.4)	11.1 (52.0)	16.1 (61.0)	19.2 (66.6)	21.5 (70.7)	20.9 (69.6)	16.0 (60.8)	10.7 (51.3)	5.0 (41.0)	0.7 (33.3)	10.7 (51.3)
Mean daily minimum °C (°F)	−2.8 (27.0)	−1.8 (28.8)	1.9 (35.4)	6.1 (43.0)	10.6 (51.1)	13.7 (56.7)	15.8 (60.4)	15.6 (60.1)	11.8 (53.2)	7.1 (44.8)	2.4 (36.3)	−1.5 (29.3)	6.6 (43.9)
Record low °C (°F)	−20.5 (−4.9)	−18.3 (−0.9)	−15.5 (4.1)	−4.3 (24.3)	1.7 (35.1)	3.7 (38.7)	7.1 (44.8)	7.9 (46.2)	3.3 (37.9)	−5.9 (21.4)	−11.5 (11.3)	−19.8 (−3.6)	−20.5 (−4.9)
Average precipitation mm (inches)	29 (1.1)	29 (1.1)	40 (1.6)	34 (1.3)	60 (2.4)	63 (2.5)	63 (2.5)	69 (2.7)	55 (2.2)	39 (1.5)	43 (1.7)	39 (1.5)	562 (22.1)
Average relative humidity (%) (at 14:00)	74.6	66.9	58.8	51.9	53.0	53.8	51.6	52.9	57.9	64.4	74.2	78.3	61.5
Mean monthly sunshine hours	69	107	147	204	244	242	271	255	192	144	72	55	2,002
Percentage possible sunshine	27.5	41.3	43.8	54.5	57.0	56.4	61.8	62.9	55.0	46.5	28.1	23.0	46.5
Source: Central Institute for Meteorology and Geodynamics

Climate data for Neusiedl am See (1971–2000)
Month	Jan	Feb	Mar	Apr	May	Jun	Jul	Aug	Sep	Oct	Nov	Dec	Year
Record high °C (°F)	16.6 (61.9)	19.0 (66.2)	25.2 (77.4)	28.6 (83.5)	31.8 (89.2)	36.3 (97.3)	35.2 (95.4)	36.0 (96.8)	33.0 (91.4)	26.5 (79.7)	21.1 (70.0)	17.4 (63.3)	36.3 (97.3)
Mean daily maximum °C (°F)	2.6 (36.7)	5.1 (41.2)	10.6 (51.1)	15.7 (60.3)	21.2 (70.2)	24.0 (75.2)	26.3 (79.3)	26.2 (79.2)	21.2 (70.2)	15.1 (59.2)	7.7 (45.9)	4.0 (39.2)	15.0 (59.0)
Daily mean °C (°F)	−0.5 (31.1)	1.1 (34.0)	5.4 (41.7)	10.0 (50.0)	15.2 (59.4)	18.3 (64.9)	20.4 (68.7)	20.1 (68.2)	15.5 (59.9)	9.9 (49.8)	4.2 (39.6)	1.1 (34.0)	10.1 (50.2)
Mean daily minimum °C (°F)	−3.0 (26.6)	−1.8 (28.8)	1.7 (35.1)	5.4 (41.7)	9.9 (49.8)	13.0 (55.4)	15.0 (59.0)	15.1 (59.2)	11.4 (52.5)	6.5 (43.7)	1.7 (35.1)	−1.3 (29.7)	6.1 (43.0)
Record low °C (°F)	−20.5 (−4.9)	−18.3 (−0.9)	−15.5 (4.1)	−4.3 (24.3)	−1.0 (30.2)	3.2 (37.8)	6.4 (43.5)	6.5 (43.7)	2.0 (35.6)	−5.9 (21.4)	−11.5 (11.3)	−19.8 (−3.6)	−20.5 (−4.9)
Average precipitation mm (inches)	32.2 (1.27)	28.7 (1.13)	37.1 (1.46)	42.2 (1.66)	61.4 (2.42)	64.9 (2.56)	63.6 (2.50)	63.0 (2.48)	49.8 (1.96)	43.5 (1.71)	47.8 (1.88)	40.1 (1.58)	574.3 (22.61)
Average snowfall cm (inches)	10.8 (4.3)	10.3 (4.1)	5.4 (2.1)	0.1 (0.0)	0.0 (0.0)	0.0 (0.0)	0.0 (0.0)	0.0 (0.0)	0.0 (0.0)	0.0 (0.0)	5.3 (2.1)	10.5 (4.1)	42.4 (16.7)
Average precipitation days (≥ 1.0 mm)	6.3	5.8	6.9	6.7	8.2	8.7	7.5	7.6	6.4	5.8	7.8	7.1	84.8
Average relative humidity (%) (at 14:00)	76.3	69.0	59.1	52.7	52.5	53.6	51.9	52.3	57.4	63.6	74.8	77.8	61.8
Mean monthly sunshine hours	63.6	100.5	139.2	186.3	235.6	233.6	252.0	244.9	183.7	141.0	70.6	54.1	1,905.1
Percentage possible sunshine	25.1	38.5	41.7	50.3	55.8	54.6	58.0	61.1	53.0	46.2	27.4	22.8	44.5
Source: Central Institute for Meteorology and Geodynamics

Historical population
Year	Pop.	±%
1869	2,411	—
1880	2,843	+17.9%
1890	2,899	+2.0%
1900	3,211	+10.8%
1910	2,898	−9.7%
1923	2,764	−4.6%
1934	3,943	+42.7%
1939	3,616	−8.3%
1951	3,625	+0.2%
1961	3,826	+5.5%
1971	3,999	+4.5%
1981	4,122	+3.1%
1991	4,675	+13.4%
2001	5,584	+19.4%
2011	7,005	+25.4%
2021	8,643	+23.4%

== Politics ==
The current mayor is Elisabeth Böhm of the Social Democratic Party, who has served since 2017. She was last elected in 2022, winning 51.68% in a direct election. The district council has 25 seats. The most recent election was on 2 October 2022.

Party	Votes	%	+/-	Seats	+/-
Social Democratic Party of Austria (SPÖ)	1,915	44.02	▲6.05	12	▲2
Austrian People's Party (ÖVP)	1,679	38.60	▼2.03	10	▼1
The Greens – The Green Alternative (GRÜNE)	422	9.70	▼0.27	2	▲0
Freedom Party of Austria (FPÖ)	225	5.17	▼2.79	1	▼1
Others	109	2.51	▼0.96	0	±0
Total	4,350	100.00		25	

== Gallery ==
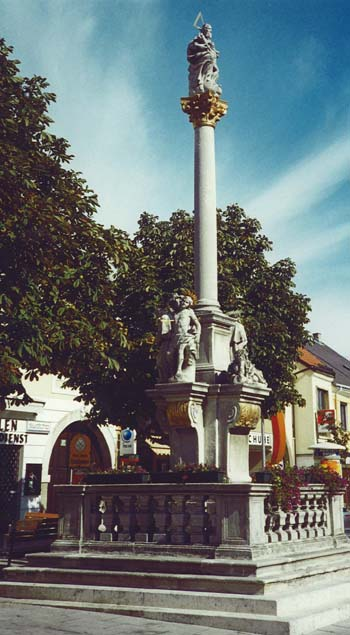
Holy trinity column created in 1713-14 by Elias Hügel.

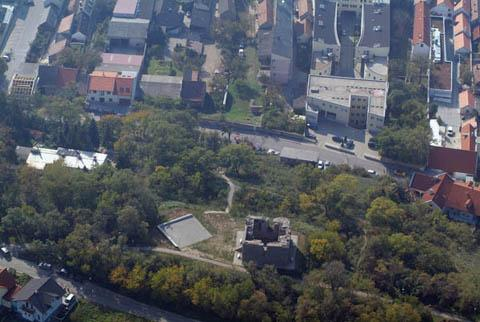
Tabor ruin, a watchtower probably from 16th century.

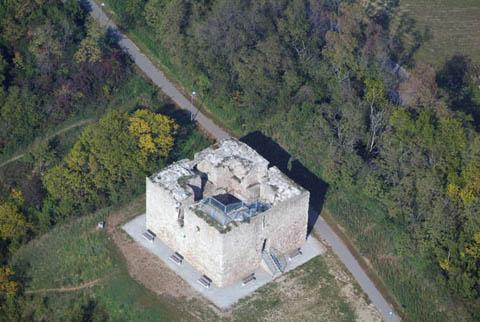
Tabor ruin.

== See also ==
- Ostautobahn
- Moson County
- List of concentration and internment camps
