= Nordost Autobahn =

Motorway in Austria

Motorway A6
- Nordost Autobahn A6

Route information
- Length: 22 km (14 mi)

Major junctions
- From: Bruckneudorf (A4)
- Potzneusiedl Gattendorf Kittsee
- To: Border crossing Kittsee, D4/D2, Bratislava Slovakia

Location
- Country: Austria
- Regions: Burgenland, Lower Austria

Highway system
- Highways of Austria; Autobahns; Expressways; State Roads
← A 5	→ A 7

The Nordost Autobahn A6 or Northeastern motorway is a motorway in eastern Austria and it connects Slovakia to the Austrian motorway system.

It begins at A4 junction near Bruckneudorf, going east, bypassing Potzneusiedl, crossing the Leitha river by a 410-metre-long (1,350 ft) bridge, then beyond Gattendorf copying existing national road heading northeast and near Kittsee turning east to the Slovak border, where border crossing already exists since 1998.

Construction started in November 2004 and lasted until November 2007. Total planned costs were 182 million euro, but the real final costs sank to 146 million euro. The motorway was opened on 19 November 2007, and opened to traffic on 20 November 2007.
