= Halbturn =

- Municipality
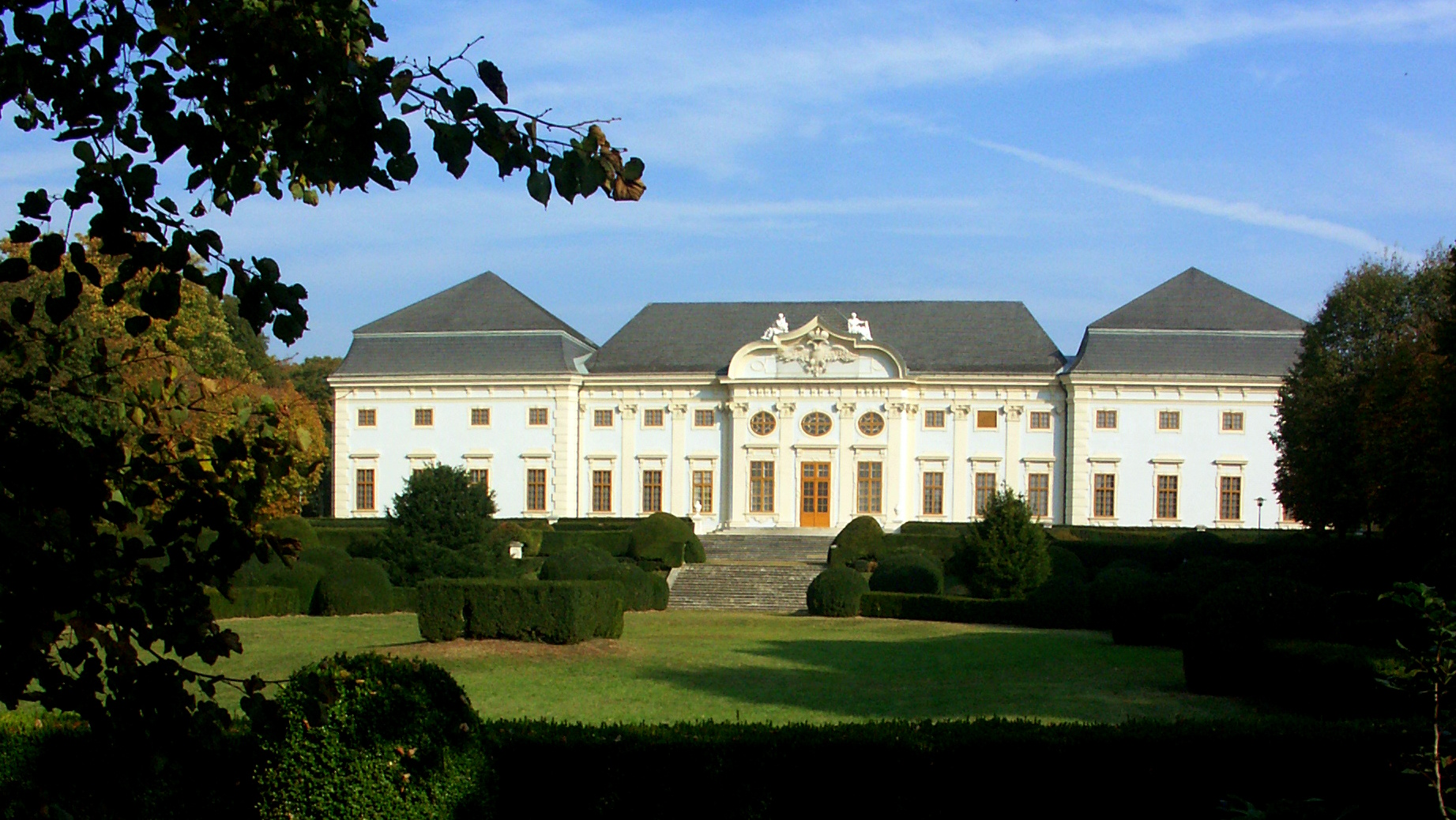
- Halbturn Palace

- Coat of arms

- Location within Austria
- Coordinates: 47°52′N 16°58′E
- Country: Austria
- State: Burgenland
- District: Neusiedl am See

Government
  - Mayor: Markus Ulram (ÖVP)

Area
  - Total: 55.21 km^{2} (21.32 sq mi)

Population (2018-01-01)
  - Total: 1,901
  - Density: 34.43/km^{2} (89.18/sq mi)
- Time zone: UTC+1 (CET)
  - Summer (DST): UTC+2 (CEST)
- Postal code: 7131
- Website: www.halbturn.at

Halbturn (Hungarian: Féltorony) is a town in the district of Neusiedl am See in the east Austrian state of Burgenland. It borders Hungary to the east and is near Andau, Gols, and Mönchof.

== History ==
In 2008 a team of archeologists discovered a third-century AD amulet in the form of a gold scroll with the words of the Jewish prayer Shema' Yisrael (Hear, O Israel! The Lord is our God, the Lord is one) inscribed on it. It is considered to be the earliest surviving evidence of a Jewish presence in what is now Austria.

Halbturn Palace was built between 1701 and 1711 by Johann Lukas von Hildebrandt as a hunting lodge for Charles VI, Holy Roman Emperor. His daughter, Empress Maria Theresa, had it enlarged and gave it to her daughter Maria Christina, Duchess of Teschen. In 1955 it was inherited by Baron Paul Waldbott von Bassenheim, a Habsburg matrilineal descendant. In 2008 it passed to his nephew, Count Markus von Königsegg-Aulendorf.

== Population ==
Historical population
Year	Pop.	±%
1869	2,093	—
1880	2,473	+18.2%
1890	2,263	−8.5%
1900	2,429	+7.3%
1910	2,460	+1.3%
1923	2,170	−11.8%
1934	2,210	+1.8%
1939	2,142	−3.1%
1951	1,995	−6.9%
1961	1,917	−3.9%
1971	1,913	−0.2%
1981	1,896	−0.9%
1991	1,956	+3.2%
2001	1,880	−3.9%
2011	1,921	+2.2%
2021	1,919	−0.1%
