= Gols =

Gols may refer to:

- Inositol 3-alpha-galactosyltransferase, an enzyme
- Gols (town)
- Grand Orange Lodge of Scotland, organization
