= Potzneusiedl =

- Municipality
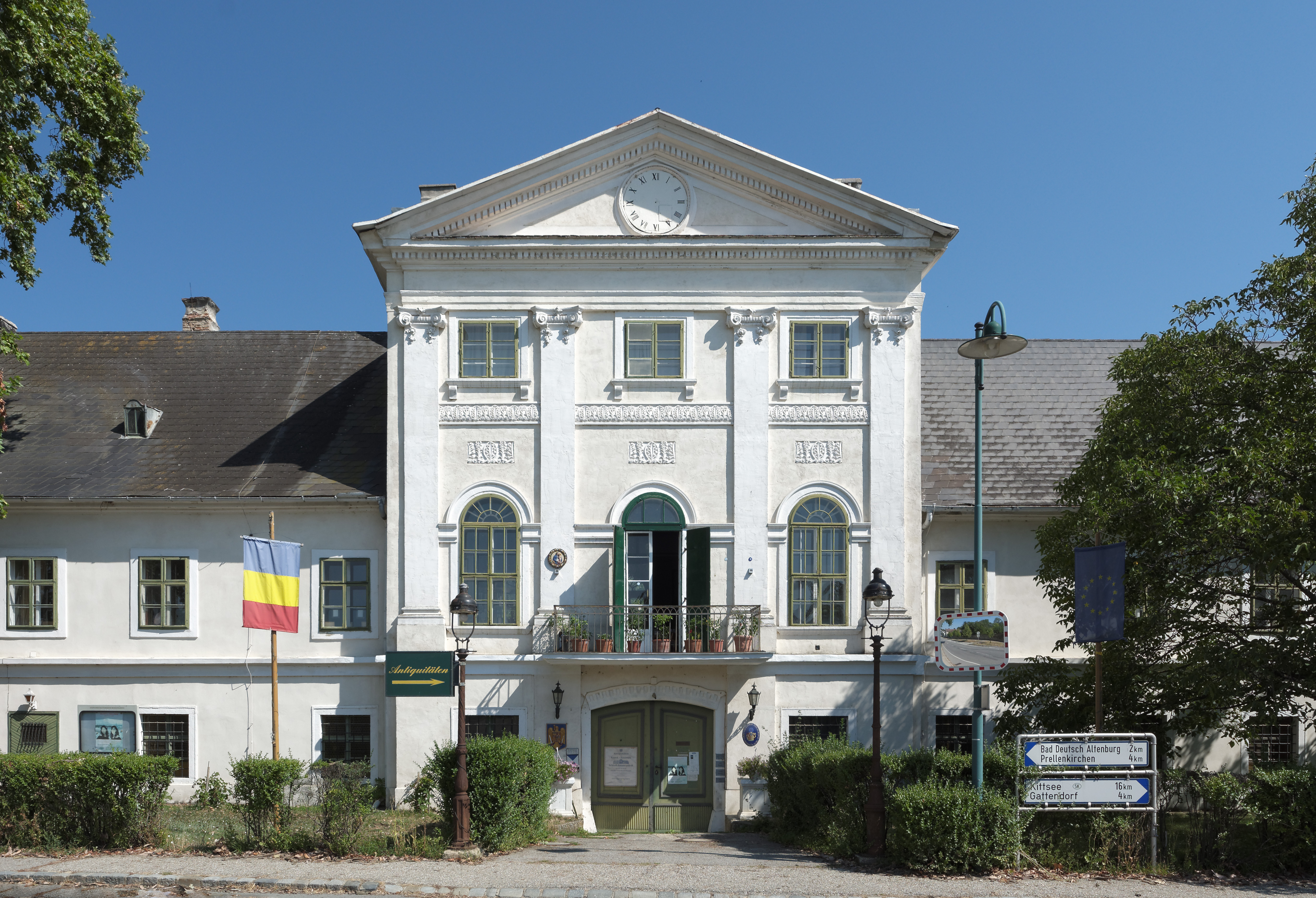
- Palace in Potzneusiedl

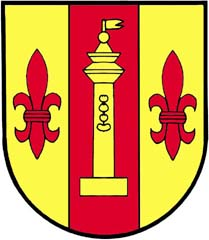
- Coat of arms

- Location within Austria
- Coordinates: 48°3′N 16°57′E
- Country: Austria
- State: Burgenland
- District: Neusiedl am See

Government
  - Mayor: Franz Werdenich (ÖVP)

Area
  - Total: 12.11 km^{2} (4.68 sq mi)

Population (2018-01-01)
  - Total: 602
  - Density: 49.7/km^{2} (129/sq mi)
- Time zone: UTC+1 (CET)
  - Summer (DST): UTC+2 (CEST)
- Postal code: 2473
- Area code: 02177
- Website: http://potzneusiedl.at

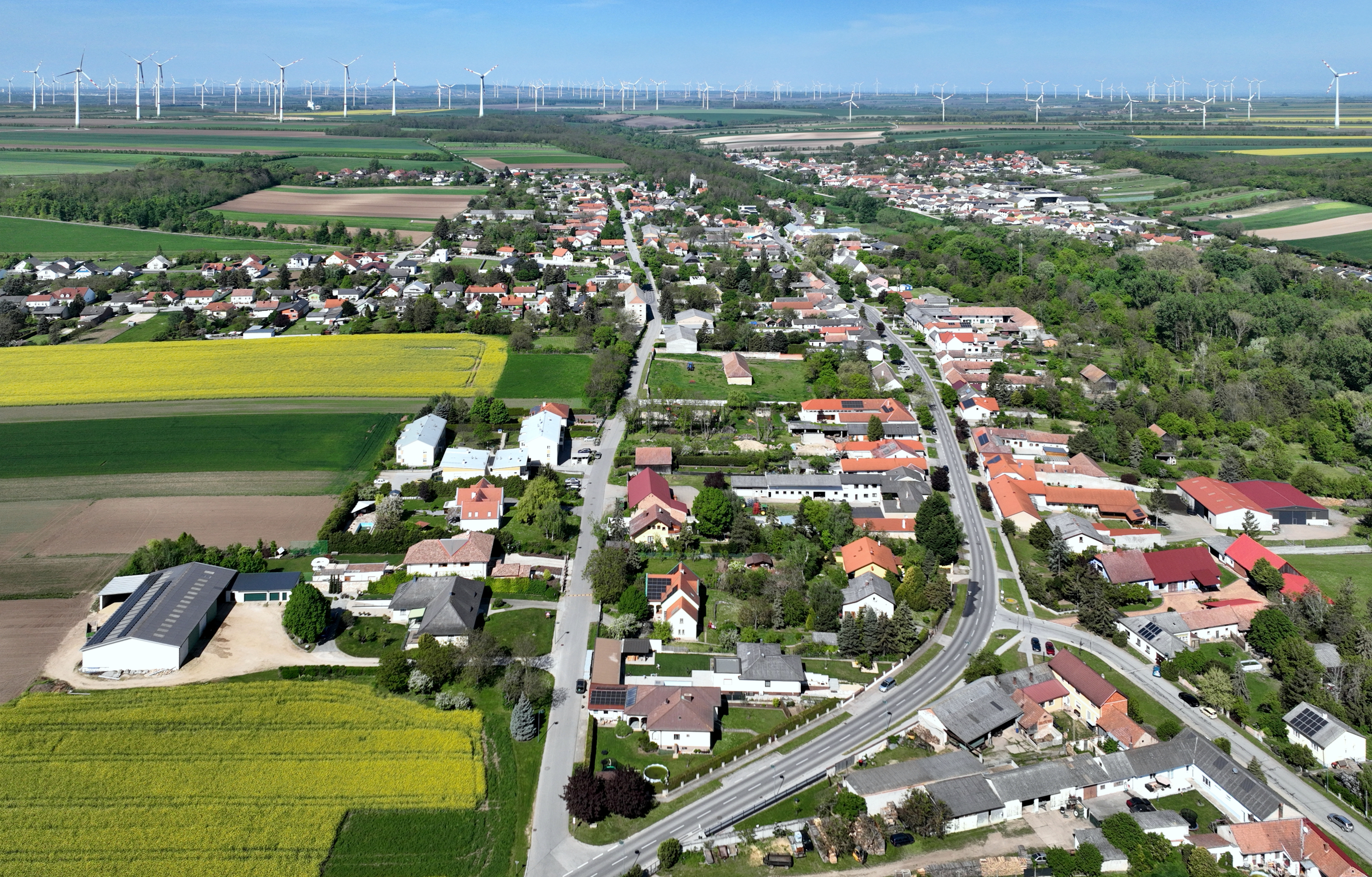
Aerial view of Potzneusiedl

Potzneusiedl (Hungarian: Lajtafalu, Croatian: Lajtica) is the smallest village in the district of Neusiedl am See in Burgenland in Austria.

== Geography ==
Potzneusiedl is the smallest village of the Neusiedl district located on the northern edge of Parndorf Plain, on the southern embankment of the river Leitha.

== History ==
The territory of this village has been settled since the remote past. Numerous archaeological finds from the Younger Stone Age. Bronze Age and Roman period testify to it. Graves and remains of Roman settlement above all abundantly represent the latter. The East Frankish King Louis II. the German Donated the territory of the village then called Lithana to the Bishopric of Passau back in 833.
The name Pozkneuselde similar to the one used now appeared only in the second half of the 13th century - the villages of Potzneusiedl and Podersdorf were founded by the Counts of Poth. The syllable "Potz-" and "Pod-" in those villages’ names are reminding us upon their founders.
The 1529 Turkish raid caused a lot of damage and it had to be re-colonized in the second half of the 16th century by Croatians. The village was in the ownership of the Harrach estate seated in Bruck an der Leitha. Its later owners were the family Bender and Batthyány, who included the village in their Kittsee estate in the 19th century. It was also the time, when the Baroque castle and tobacco factory were built in Potzneusiedl. Although the local infrastructure improved in the course of the 20th century, its industrial traditions did not develop further.

Potzneusiedl, like the rest of Burgenland, belonged to Hungary until 1920/21. After the end of the First World War, the territory of West-Hungary was given to Austria by the Treaties of St. Germain and Trianon. Since 1921, the town has belonged to the newly founded State of Burgenland.

Potzneusiedl joined Gattendorf for some time, but now it is an independent village again.

=== Castle ===
The construction of the present castle had been started on the year 1798 and was finalised in 1808. Partly the walls of the castle are grounded on gothic foundation walls. It is a three-wing building with a charming park surrounding it.
Until 1956 the castle had been the residence of the Batthyány Family (Luise Bathany is buried in the eastern party of the graveyard of the castle). During that time the castle was known as centre of magnificent parties and social events. From 1966 it has been revitalised as a centre for art and antiques. In 1970 Austria's first Museum of Icons was founded in the castle. It has been renovated continuously. Since 1993 the Potzneusiedl Theater Summer performs in the castle. Since 2001 it is the headquarters of the Romanian-Austrian Cultural Institute.

=== Church of St.Marco ===
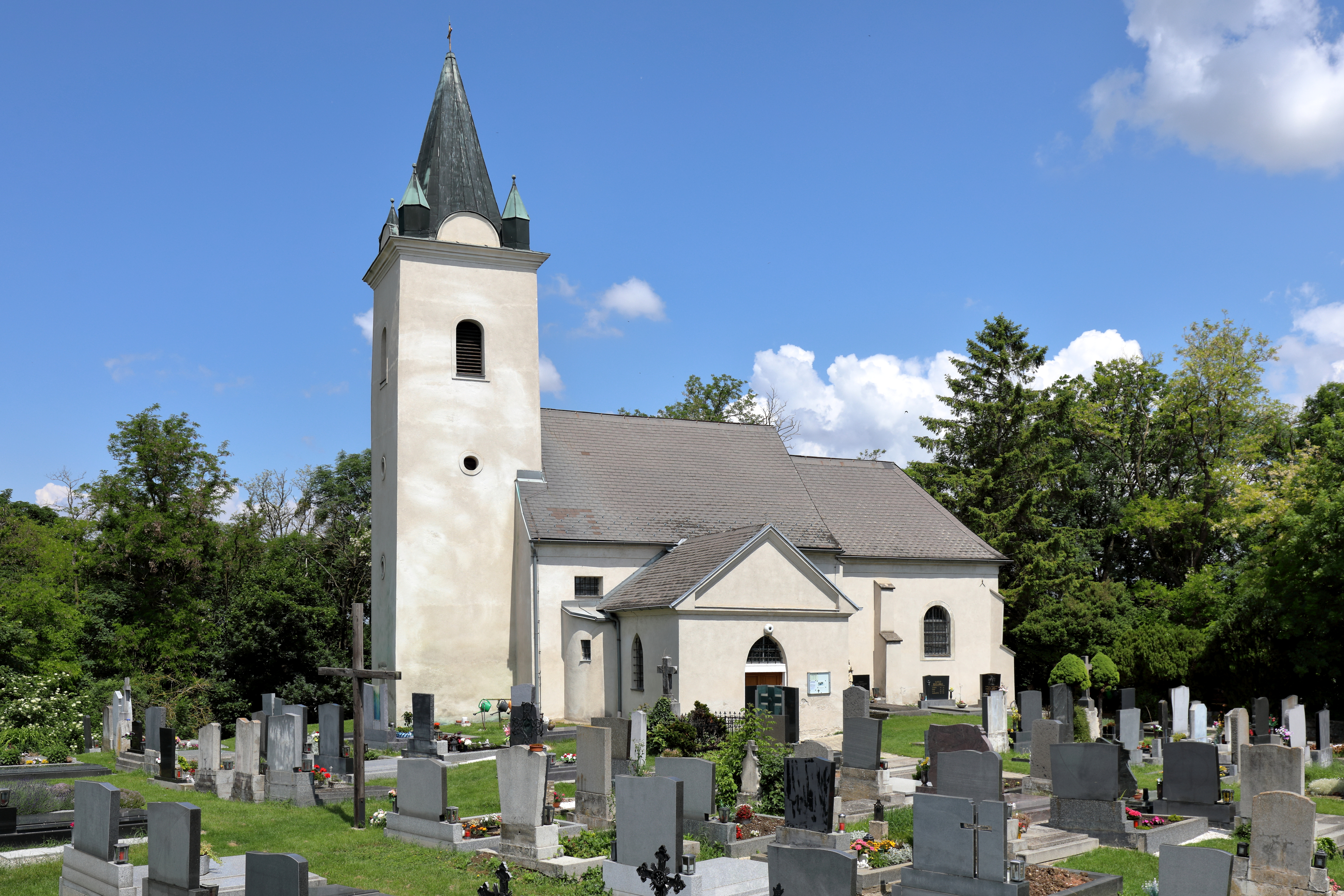
South view of the Parish church

The most important sacred monument of the village is the Roman Catholic church of St. Marco built on medieval foundations and mentioned for the first time in the 13th century. In its interior can one admire the main altars with the painting of St. Marco, statues of Sts. Peter and Paul and the Rococo side altar of St.Sebastian.

== Gallery ==
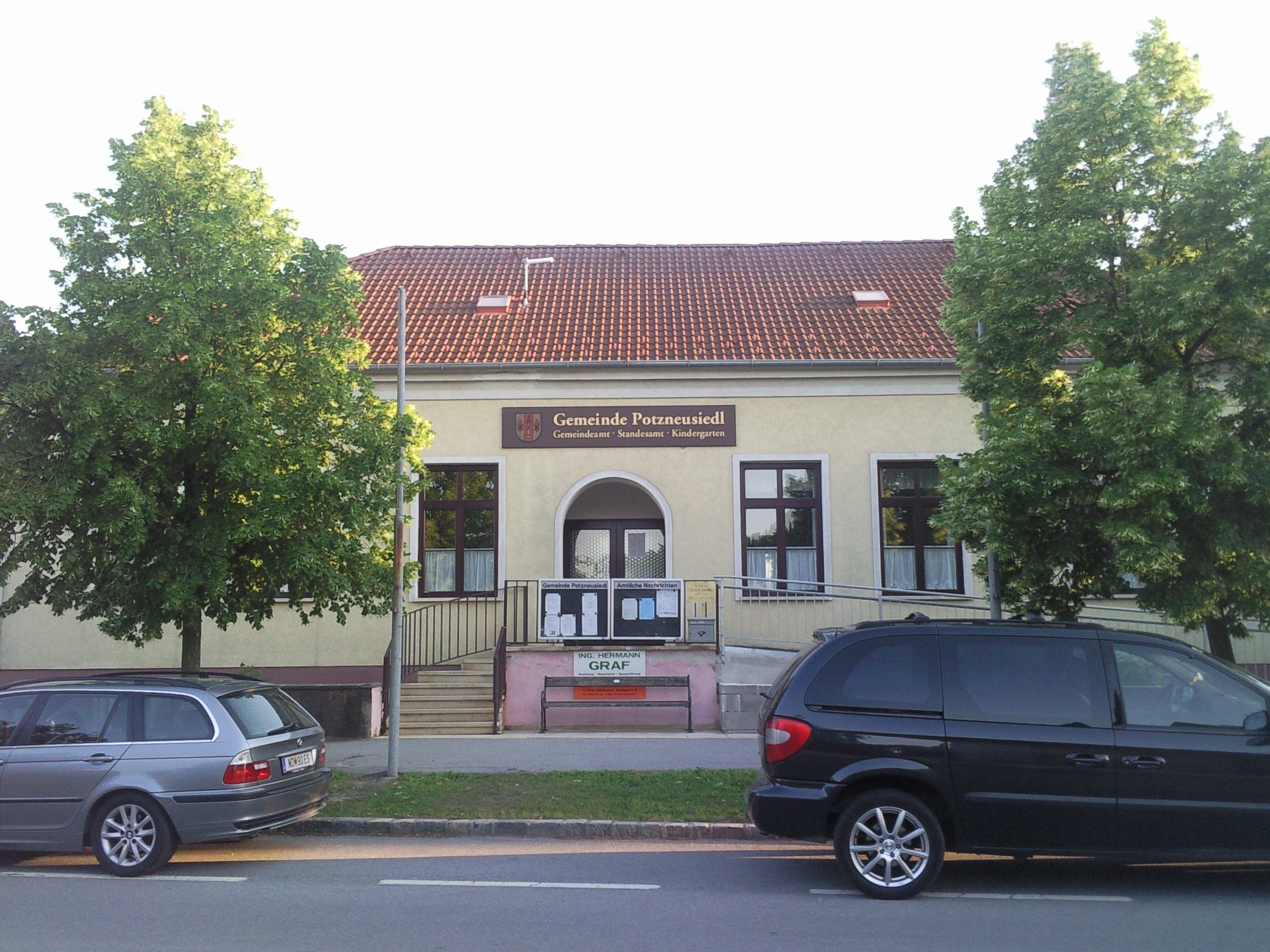
Gemeinde Potzneusiedl

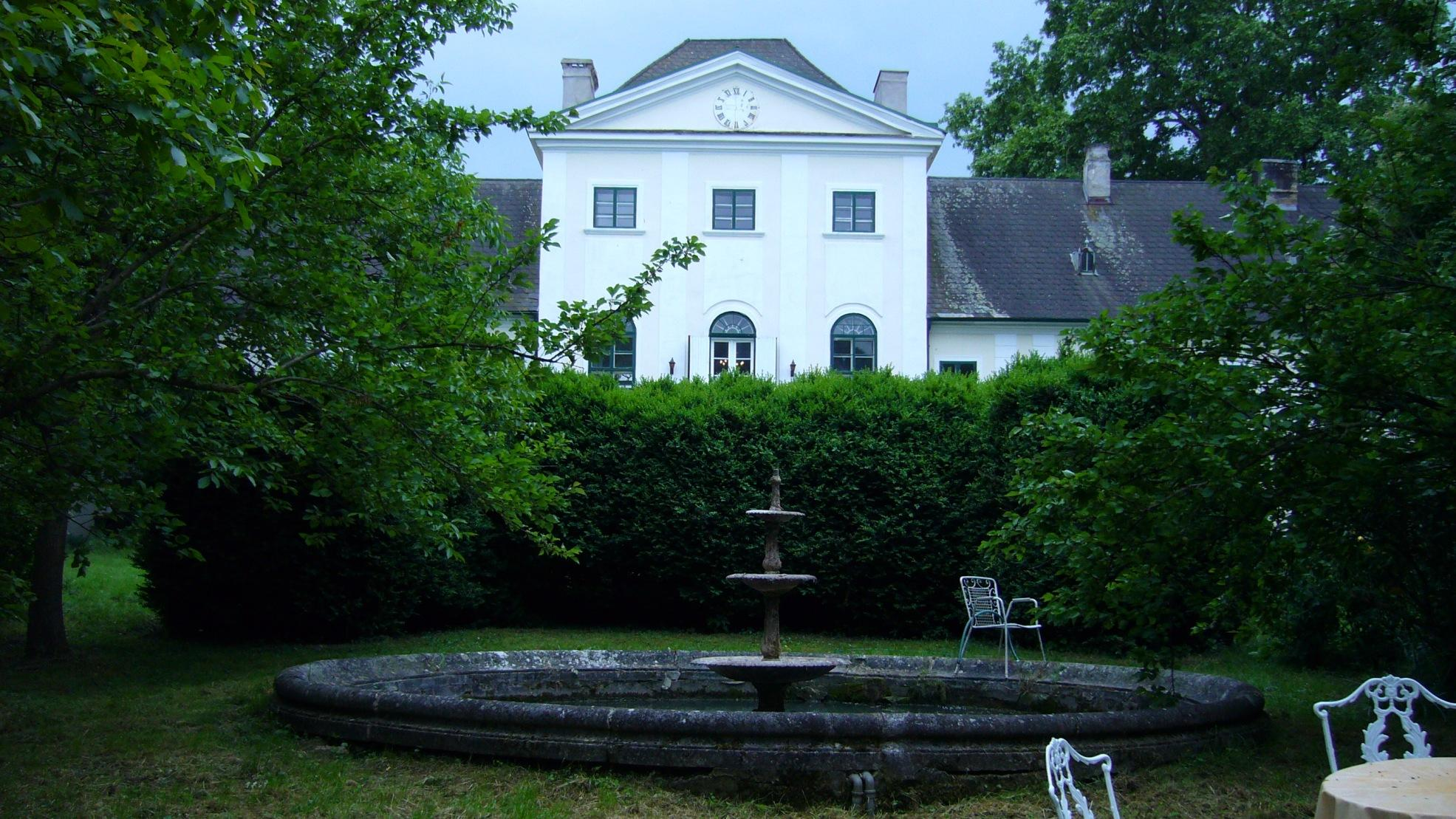

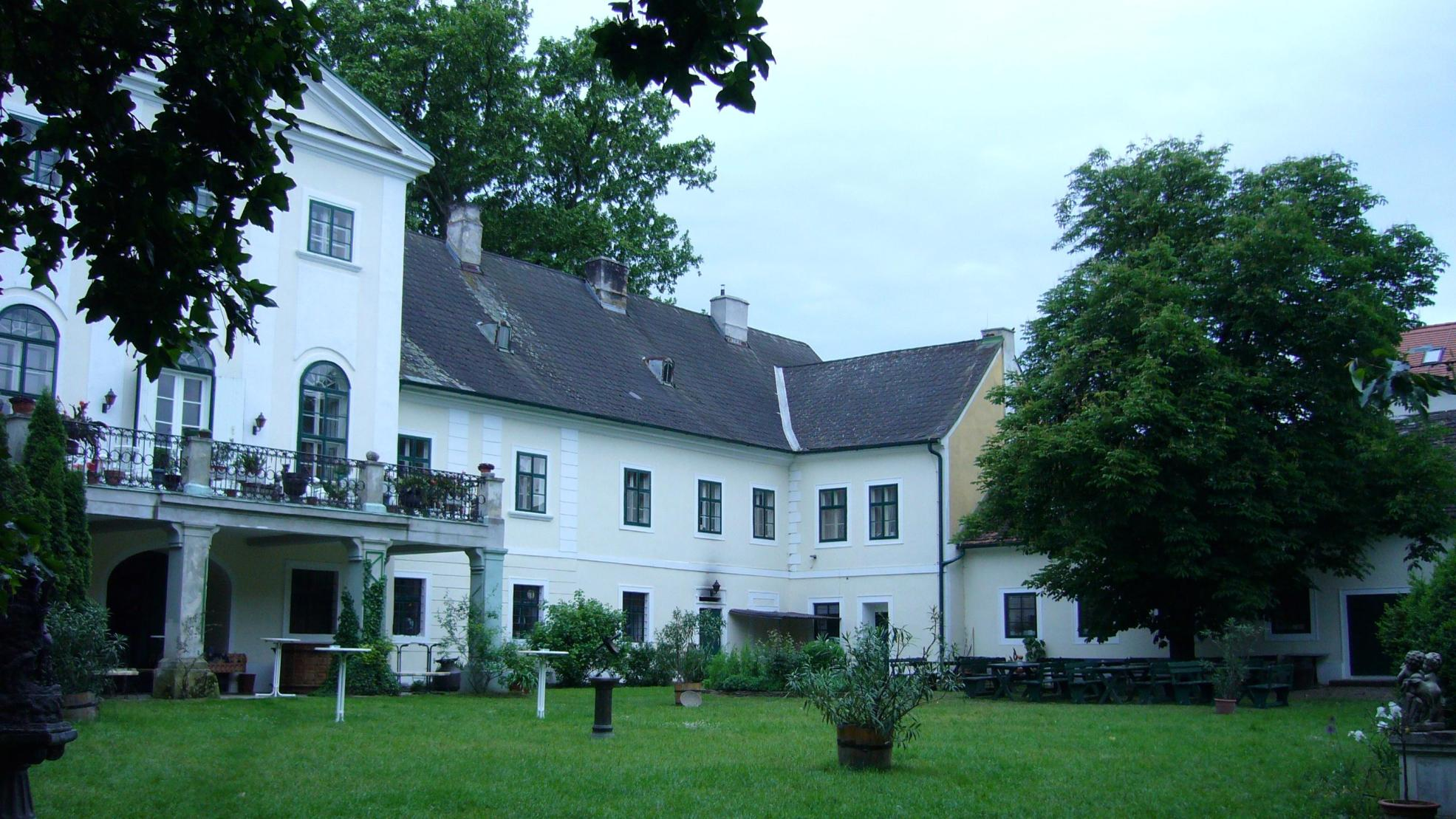
