= Pamhagen =

- Municipality
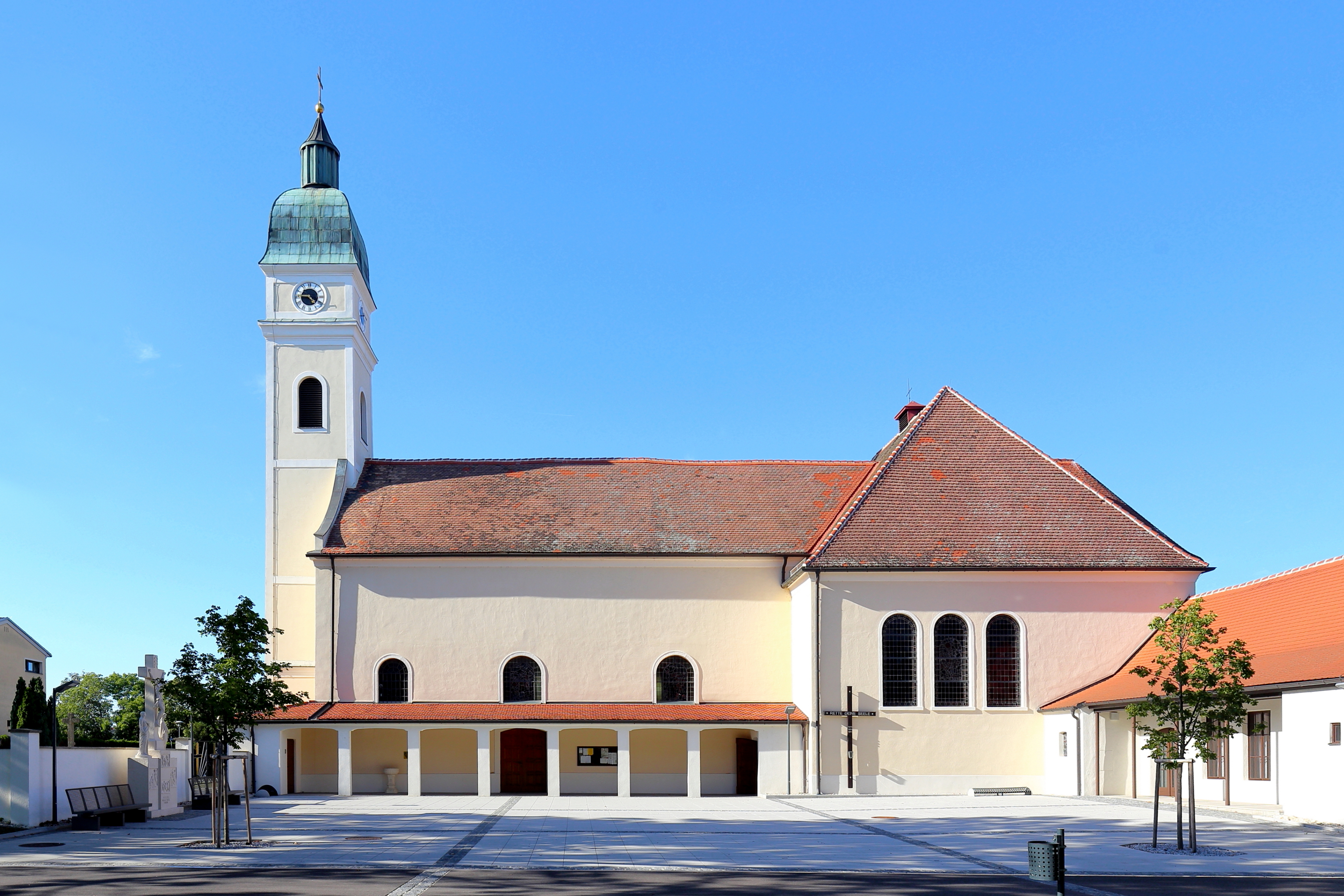
- Exaltation of the Holy Cross Church

- Coat of arms

- Location within Austria
- Coordinates: 47°42′N 16°54′E
- Country: Austria
- State: Burgenland
- District: Neusiedl am See

Government
  - Mayor: Josef Tschida (ÖVP)

Area
  - Total: 33.04 km^{2} (12.76 sq mi)
- Elevation: 121 m (397 ft)

Population (1.11.2024)
  - Total: 1 909
  - Density: 0.030/km^{2} (0.078/sq mi)
- Time zone: UTC+1 (CET)
  - Summer (DST): UTC+2 (CEST)
- Postal code: 7152
- Area code: 2175
- Vehicle registration: B (Burgenland)
- Website: https://www.gemeinde-pamhagen.at/

Pamhagen (Hungarian: Pomogy) is a town in the district of Neusiedl am See in the Austrian state of Burgenland.

== History ==
The first mention of Pamhagen (Pomog) was in 1268. A court day was documented in the city during 1547. In 1652, schools are mentioned for the first time.

In 1682, The town was renamed from Pomog (Hungarian) to Pamhagen (Austrian)

In the middle of the 16th century, Pamhagen annexed the former village Micheldorf, which had been destroyed in 1529 by Turks. The Pamhagen inhabitants subsequently became Lutherans.

In 1683, Turks burned Pamhagen down during the 2nd siege of Vienna

In 1734, Wallern became an independent parish, having belonged to Pamhagen until then.

During 1909, the Pamhagen Credit Union was founded.

Like the rest of Burgenland, the town was part of Hungary under Austria-Hungary until 1922.

On September 19, 1922, at the League of Nations conference in Geneva, Pamhagen was finally awarded to Austria, applying the commission's basic principle of peasant holdings to Austria and large estates to Hungary. In November 1922, the border east and south of the village was drawn along the Einser Canal in such a way that the canal itself remained with Hungary, while to the west, the Esterházy estate "Mexico" was given to Hungary. The characteristic "point" at Pamhagen was thus created.

== Population ==
Historical population
Year	Pop.	±%
1869	1,895	—
1880	1,766	−6.8%
1890	1,812	+2.6%
1900	1,960	+8.2%
1910	2,057	+4.9%
1923	1,789	−13.0%
1934	2,110	+17.9%
1939	2,200	+4.3%
1951	2,167	−1.5%
1961	2,133	−1.6%
1971	2,068	−3.0%
1981	1,991	−3.7%
1991	1,795	−9.8%
2001	1,768	−1.5%
2011	1,666	−5.8%
