= Sankt Andrä am Zicksee =

- Municipality
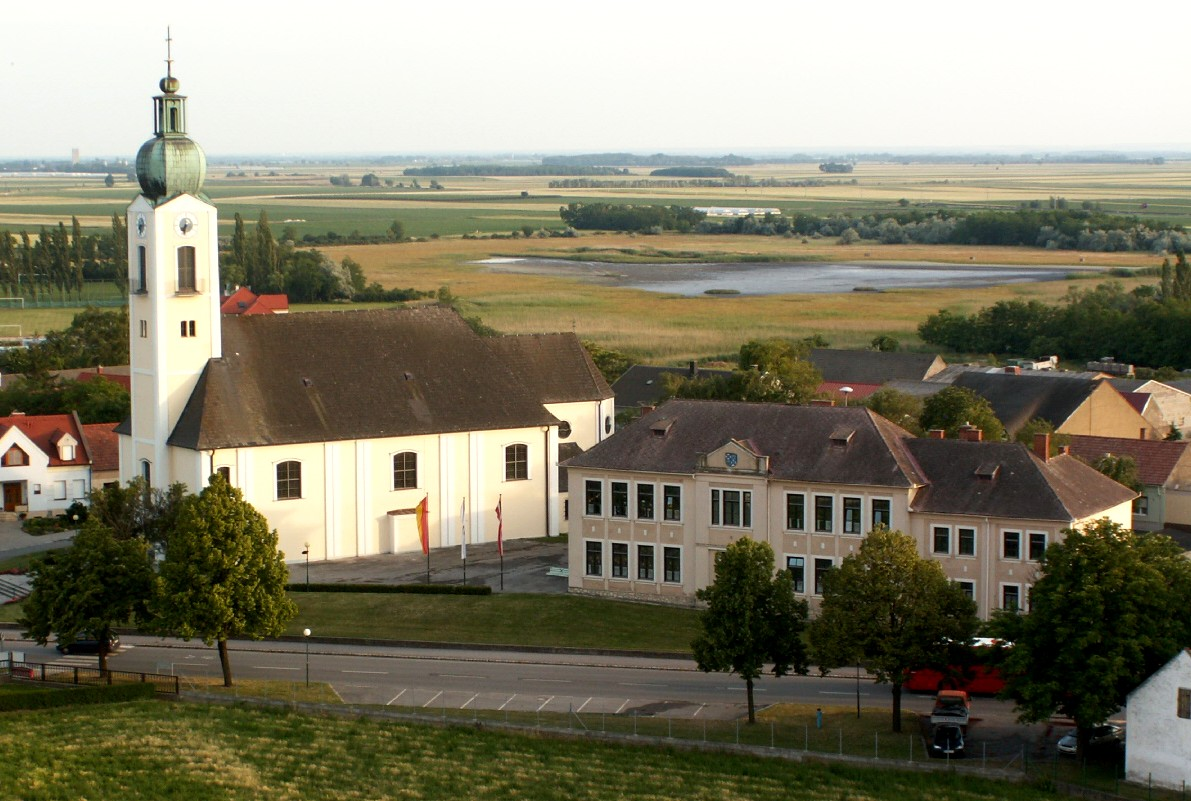
- Saint Andrew Church

- Coat of arms

- Location within Burgenland Location within Austria
- Coordinates: 47°47′N 16°56′E
- Country: Austria
- State: Burgenland
- District: Neusiedl am See

Government
  - Mayor: Andreas Sattler (ÖVP)

Area
  - Total: 31.72 km^{2} (12.25 sq mi)

Population (2018-01-01)
  - Total: 1,371
  - Density: 43.22/km^{2} (111.9/sq mi)
- Time zone: UTC+1 (CET)
  - Summer (DST): UTC+2 (CEST)
- Postal code: 7161
- Area code: 02176
- Website: www.st-andrae-am-zicksee.at

Sankt Andrä am Zicksee (Hungarian: Mosonszentandrás) is a town in the district of Neusiedl am See in the Austrian state of Burgenland.

== Population ==
Historical population
Year	Pop.	±%
1869	1,038	—
1880	1,164	+12.1%
1890	1,089	−6.4%
1900	1,115	+2.4%
1910	1,252	+12.3%
1923	1,332	+6.4%
1934	1,427	+7.1%
1939	1,467	+2.8%
1951	1,473	+0.4%
1961	1,427	−3.1%
1971	1,429	+0.1%
1981	1,390	−2.7%
1991	1,422	+2.3%
2001	1,397	−1.8%
2011	1,367	−2.1%
