= Neusiedl am See District =

Coordinates: 47.928°N 16.934°E

Neusiedl am See District Bezirk Neusiedl am See
- District
- Country: Austria
- State: Burgenland
- Number of municipalities: 27
- Administrative seat: Neusiedl am See

Government
  - District Governor: Ulrike Zschech (since 2022)

Area
  - Total: 1,005.86 km^{2} (388.36 sq mi)

Population (2024)
  - Total: 61,768
  - Density: 61.408/km^{2} (159.05/sq mi)
- Time zone: UTC+01:00 (CET)
  - Summer (DST): UTC+02:00 (CEST)
- Vehicle registration: ND
- NUTS code: AT112
- District code: 107

Bezirk Neusiedl am See (Hungarian: Nezsideri járás; Croatian: Kotar Niuzal) is a district of the state of Burgenland in Austria.

== Municipalities ==
Towns (Städte) are indicated in boldface; market towns (Marktgemeinden) in italics; suburbs, hamlets and other subdivisions of a municipality are indicated in small characters. Where appropriate, the Croatian names are given in parentheses. The figures are as of 11 May 2024.

- Andau (2,300)
- Apetlon (1,754)
- Bruckneudorf (3,085)
  - Kaisersteinbruch, Königshof (Bgld)
- Deutsch Jahrndorf (645)
- Edelstal (804)
- **Frauenkirchen** (2,932)
- Gattendorf (1,469)
- Gols (4,011)
- Halbturn (1,914)
- Illmitz (2,365)
- Jois (1,632)
- Kittsee (Gijeca) (3,630)
- Mönchhof (2,189)
- Neudorf bei Parndorf (Novo Selo) (787)
- **Neusiedl am See** (8,917)
- Nickelsdorf (1,855)
- Pama (Bijelo Selo) (1,282)
- Pamhagen (1,518)
- Parndorf (Pandrof) (5,326)
- Podersdorf am See (2,193)
- Potzneusiedl (652)
- Sankt Andrä am Zicksee (1,386)
- Tadten (1,191)
- Wallern im Burgenland (1,645)
- Weiden am See (2,614)
- Winden am See (1,394)
- Zurndorf (2,279)
