= Kittsee =

- Municipality
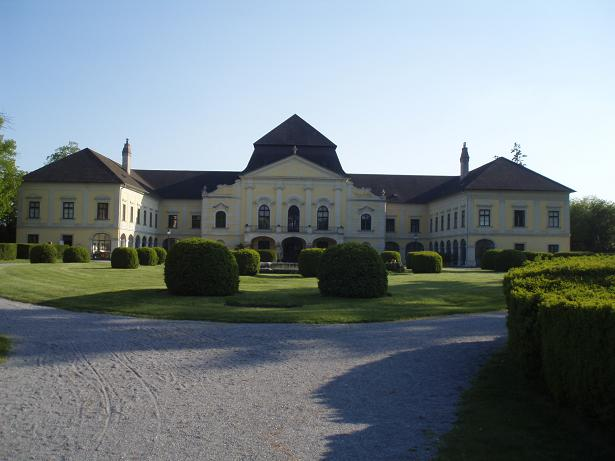
- New Palace in Kittsee

- Coat of arms
- Interactive map of Kittsee
- Location within Austria Kittsee (Austria)
- Coordinates: 48°04′00″N 17°04′00″E
- Country: Austria
- State: Burgenland
- District: Neusiedl am See

Government
  - Mayor: Johannes Hornek (ÖVP)

Area
  - Total: 19.27 km^{2} (7.44 sq mi)
- Elevation: 138 m (453 ft)

Population (2018-01-01)
  - Total: 3,162
  - Density: 164.1/km^{2} (425.0/sq mi)
- Time zone: UTC+1 (CET)
  - Summer (DST): UTC+2 (CEST)
- Postal code: 2421
- Vehicle registration: ND
- Website: www.kittsee.at

Kittsee (German pronunciation: [kiˈt͡seː]; Slovak: Kopčany, Hungarian: Köpcsény, Croatian: Gijeca) is an Austrian municipality in the District of Neusiedl am See, Burgenland.

== History ==
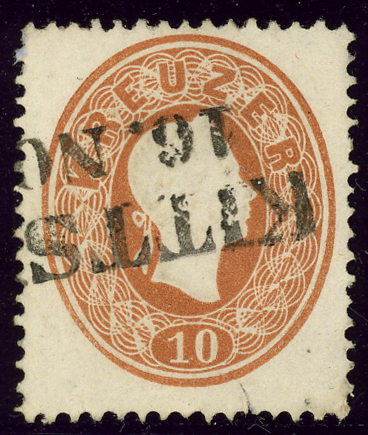
In 1861 Kittsee was in the Empire of Austria, Kingdom of Hungary

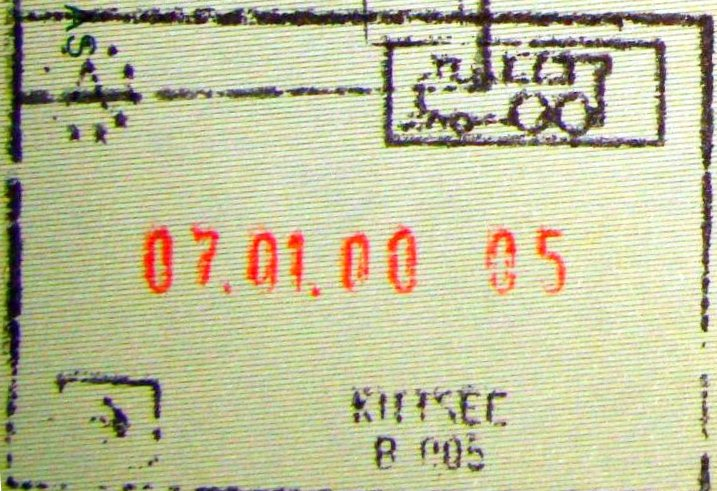
Passport stamp from the border before Slovakia joined the Schengen Area.

In the Middle Ages, the settlement was situated in the Kingdom of Hungary, and was probably settled by Pecheneg border guards in the 11th century. There was a Hungarian royal castle on the site of the settlement as early as the 12th century. The first documented mention of the settlement was in 1291; the name Koeche was in use in 1390. It is thought that the name is of Hungarian origin, and the older form was Küccse.

Since the settlement guards the entrance of the Danube into Hungary, it often played a key role in the defense of Hungary. This was the gathering site of the crusader army of Frederick I in 1198. The town was the site of Géza II's battle with the Austrians, and the wedding of Béla, son of Béla IV and Kunigunda, niece of Ottokar II, King of Bohemia, in 1264. The peace treaty of Andrew III and Albert I was signed here in 1291. After 1363, the town was owned by the Scharfenecki, Szentgyörgyi, Esterházy, and Batthyányi families.

In 1455, this was the scene of a meeting between John Hunyadi and Ulrich II of Celje. Ferdinand I received envoys here from Hungary on the way to his coronation in Székesfehérvár. In 1529 and 1683, it was destroyed by Ottoman armies. In 1676, it became the property of the Esterházy family. The town's ancient moated castle, built in the 12th century, was first mentioned in 1344 and was destroyed by the Ottomans in 1529. It was replaced by the Grange, built in 1552.

From 1880, the Batthyány-Strattman family were the main landlords in the town. Kittsee was one of the Siebengemeinden of Burgenland.

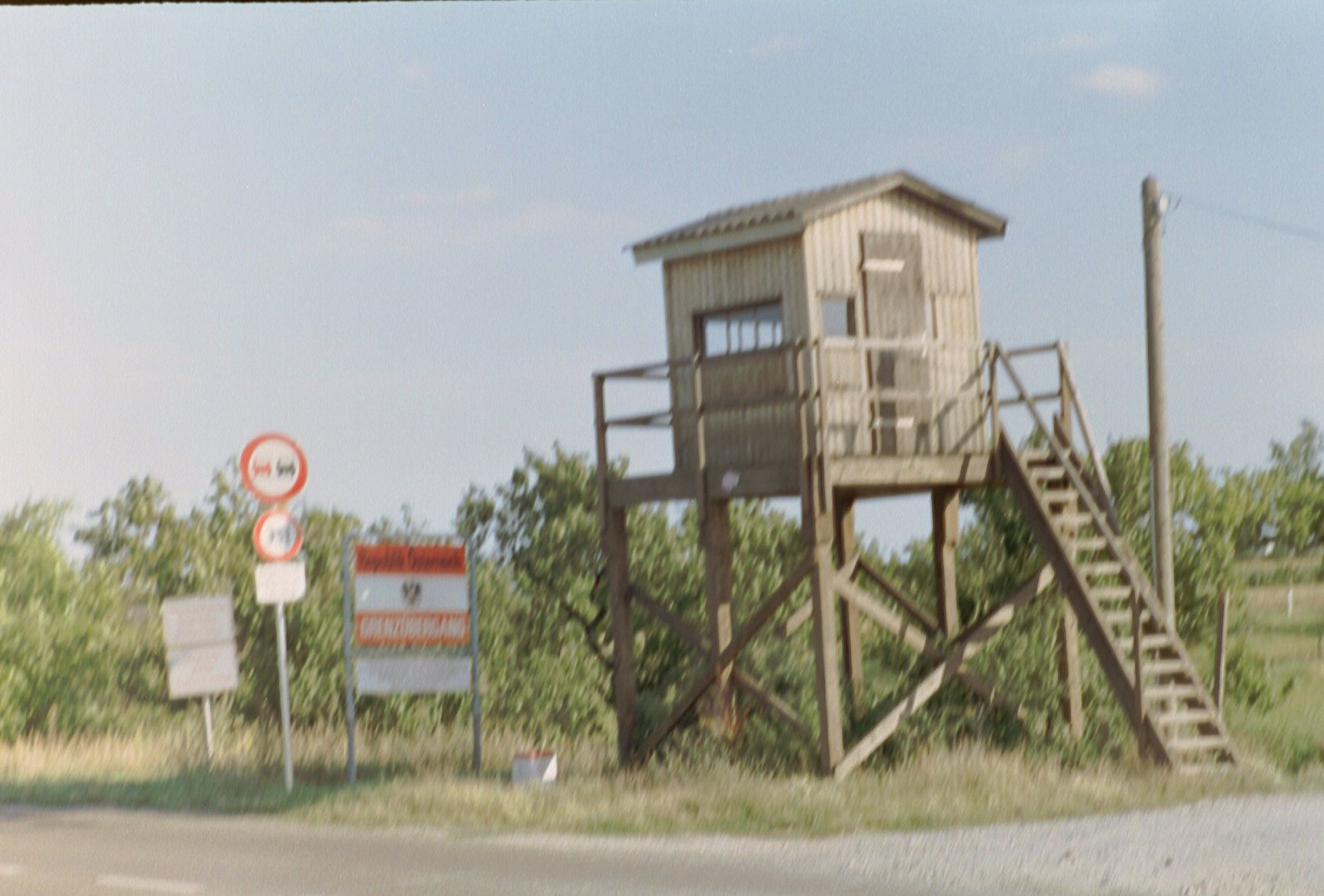
Kittsee former border crossing

Kittsee, like the rest of Burgenland, belonged to Hungary until 1920/21. After the end of the First World War, the territory of West-Hungary was given to Austria by the Treaties of St. Germain and Trianon. Since 1921, the town has belonged to the newly founded State of Burgenland. It is on the Austria-Slovakia Border

== Politics ==
Kittsee's mayor is Johannes Hornek of the ÖVP. And its vice-mayor is Karin Darnai of the SPÖ. The political composition of the Municipal Council (23 seats) is ÖVP 9, SPÖ 8, FPÖ 0, Grüne 0, and other lists 6.

== Business and infrastructure ==
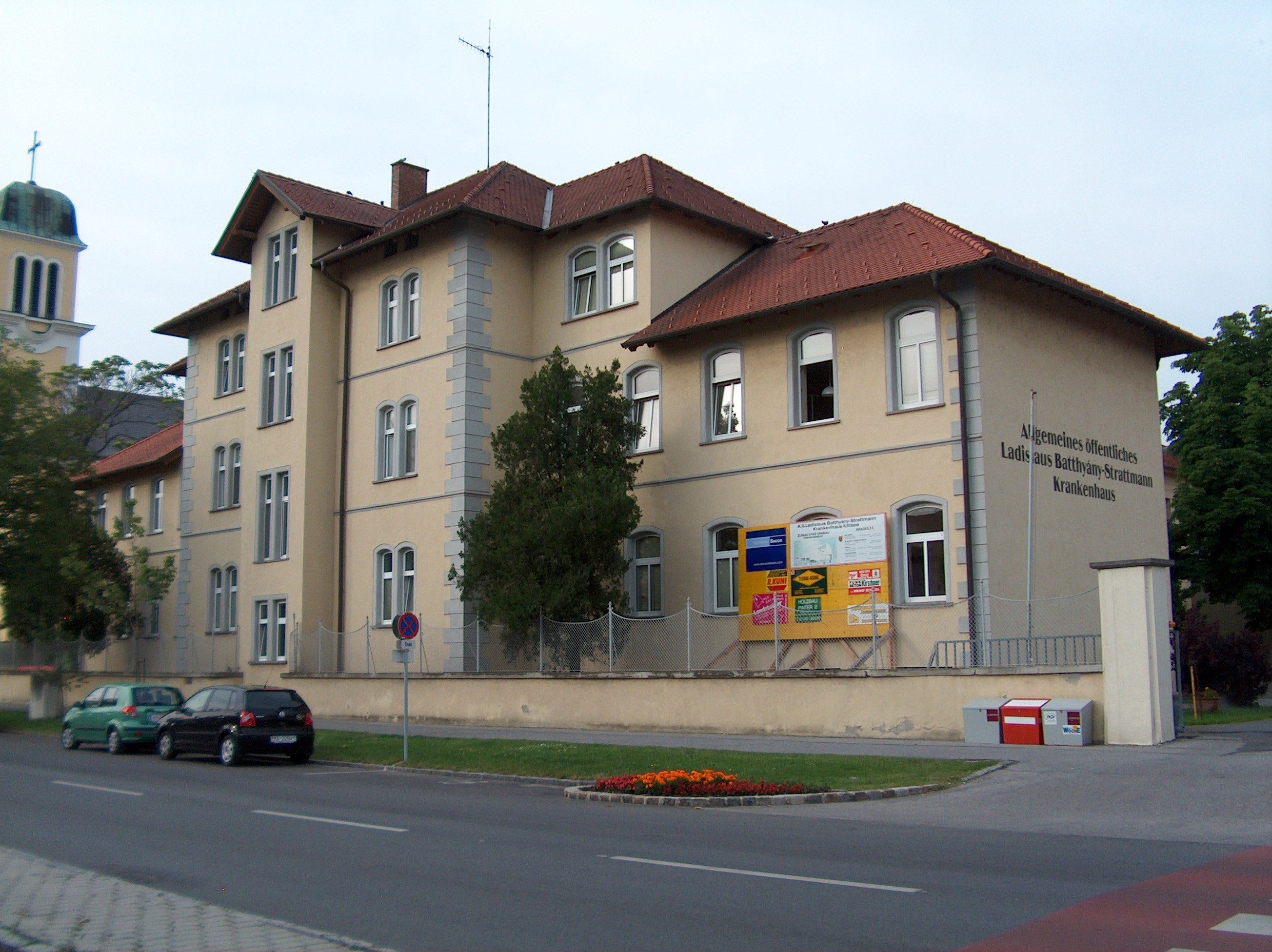
Hospital (Krankenhaus), Kittsee

The municipality plays an important role as a medical center, because the district's only hospital is located there. It was founded by the ophthalmologist Prince Ladislaus Batthyány-Strattmann, who ran the hospital until 1921. It was named after him in 2004.

Kittsee is also home to a rescue station of the Red Cross.

The town is famous for its 30,000 apricot trees, which are cared for by the Kittsee Apricot Club.

== Historical sites ==
- Remains of a medieval church named after St. Pancratius, only the tower survived after 1529. The original building was erected before 1250. The present-day Church of Exaltation of the Holy Cross was built in 1736 (named Church of Our Lady until 1808).
- The new Castle (Schloss Kittsee) was built in 1668 by expanding the Grange. Since 1974, it has housed an ethnographic museum.
- Joseph Joachim's birth-house.

== Notable residents ==
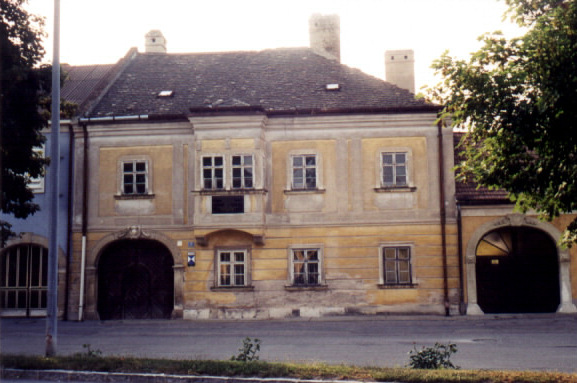
Joseph Joachim's birth house in Kittsee

- Joseph Joachim, Hungarian-Jewish violinist and composer, born here on 28 June 1831
- János Listi, Hungarian noble. Baron of Köpcsény (Kittsee), bishop of Győr (Raab) born in Nagyszeben. Ennobled in 1554, died in 1577 in Prague.
- László Listi (or Listius László), Hungarian noble, poet, owned the "old" Kittsee/Köpcsény castle ca 1635
- László Batthyány-Strattmann, Hungarian noble, medical doctor

== Gallery ==
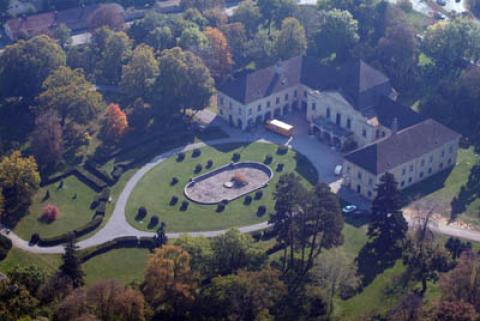

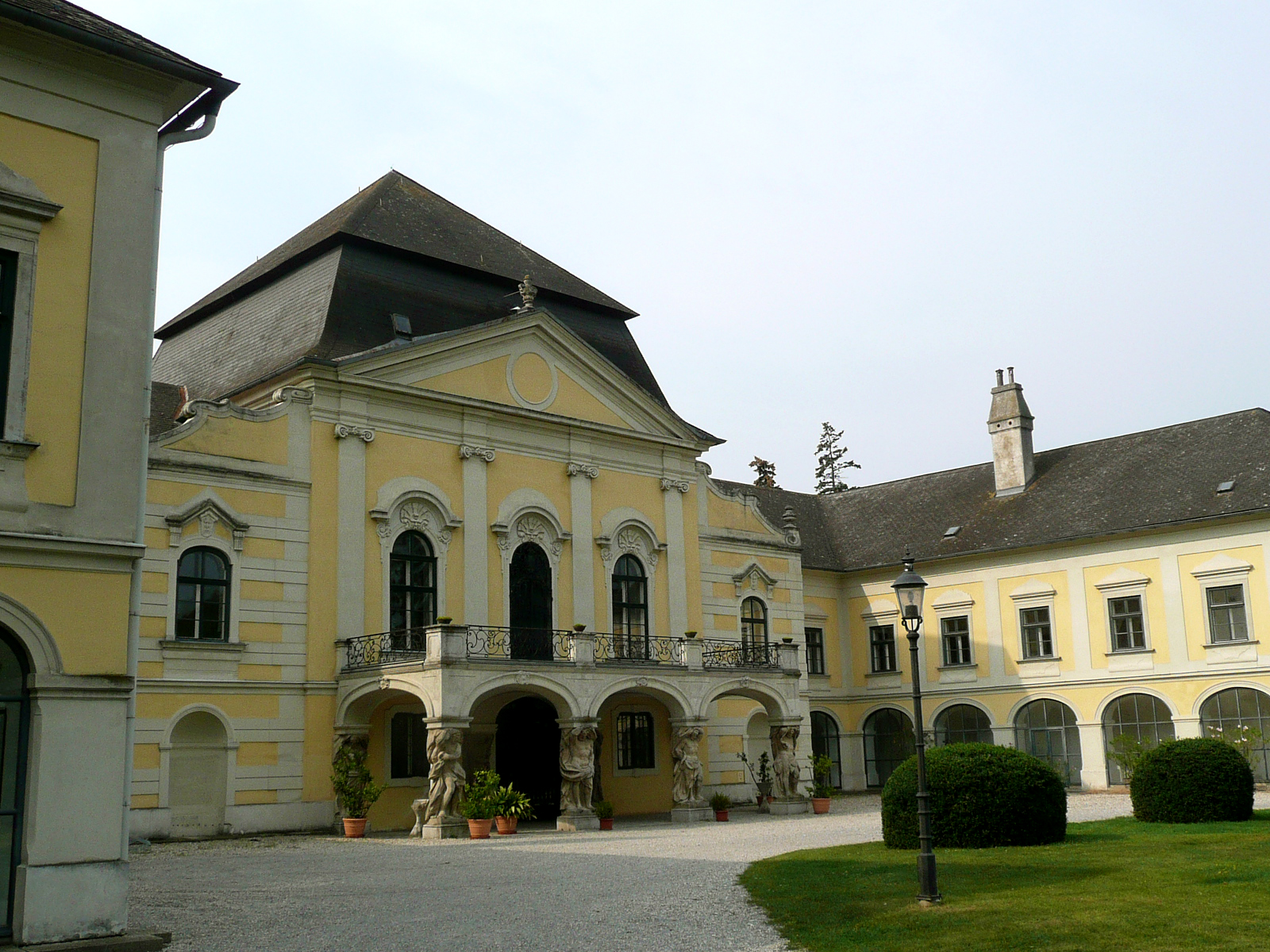

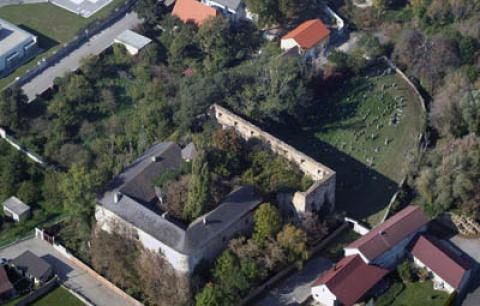

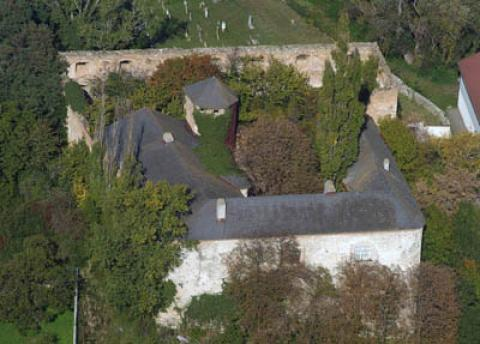

== Nearby municipalities and sites ==
- Little mountainous region under the Hundsheimer Berg (480), Königswarte (344), Spitzerberg (302) (NÖ)
- Berg, Neuhof, Pottenburg, Wolfsthal, Rotes Kreuz, Edelstal (Burgenland), Bundessportsschule (under the Spitzerberg), Hundsheim, and Bad-Deutsch-Altenburg, Hainburg, Braunsberg & Röthelstein, also Carnuntum
- Pama, Csardahof, Zeiselhof, Deutsch Jahrndorf in the Heideboden
- Bratislava - capital city of Slovakia

== See also ==
- Summer Archbishop's Palace
