= Tadten =

- Municipality
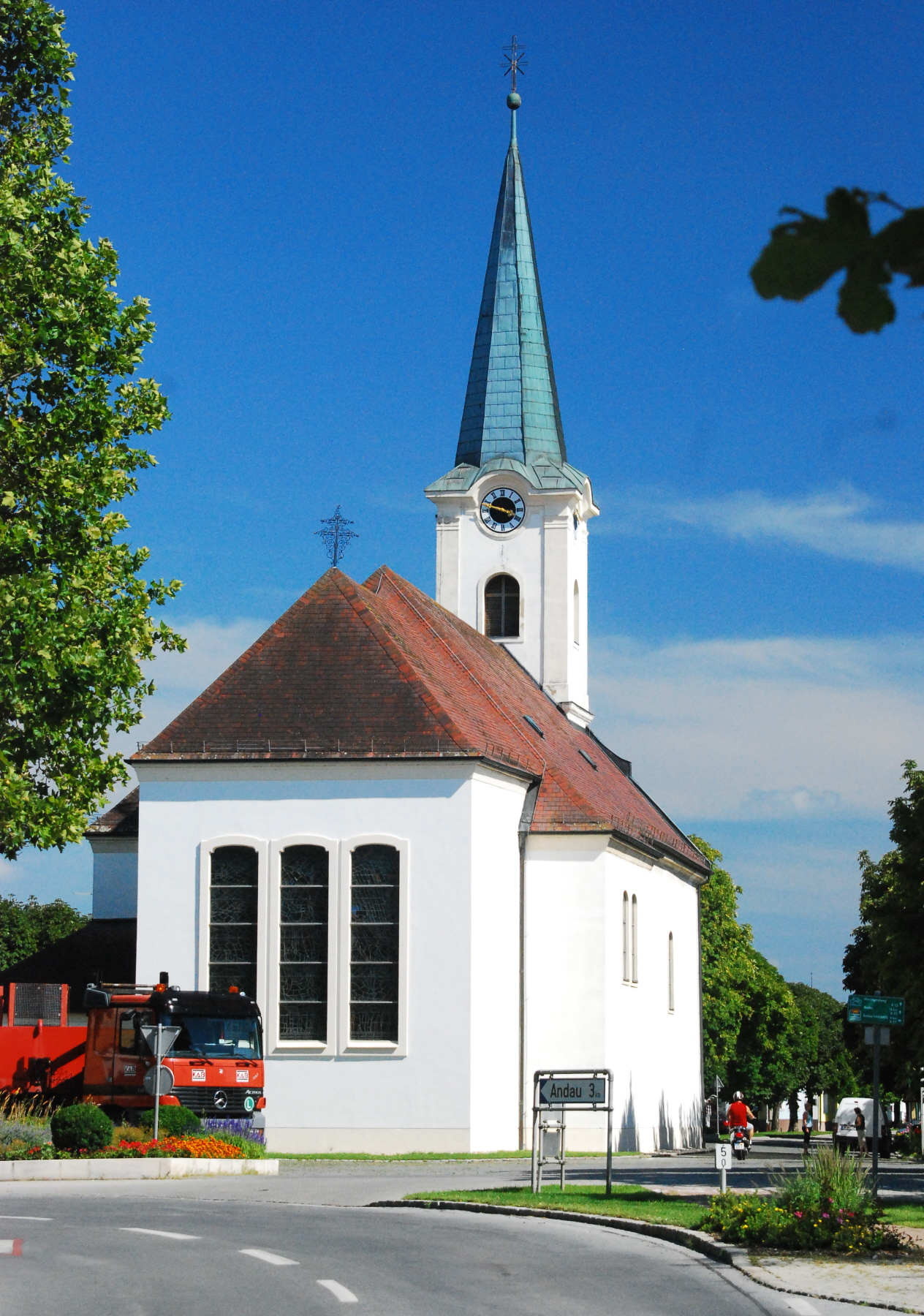
- Saint Michael Church

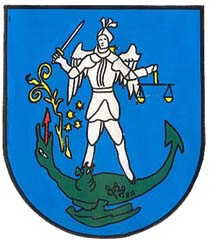
- Coat of arms

- Location within Austria
- Coordinates: 47°46′N 16°59′E
- Country: Austria
- State: Burgenland
- District: Neusiedl am See

Government
  - Mayor: Willibald Goldenits (ÖVP)

Area
  - Total: 36.06 km^{2} (13.92 sq mi)
- Elevation: 120 m (390 ft)

Population (2018-01-01)
  - Total: 1,186
  - Density: 32.89/km^{2} (85.18/sq mi)
- Time zone: UTC+1 (CET)
  - Summer (DST): UTC+2 (CEST)
- Postal code: 7162

Tadten (Hungarian: Mosontétény) is a village in the district of Neusiedl am See in Burgenland, Austria.

Tadten is a wine growing village with 1,166 inhabitants (as of 2024) and lies at the transition from the Seewinkel region to the Hungarian puszta. In 1357 Tadten, then called "Tetun", was mentioned in a conflict of possession by the Raab chapter. The first settlement dates back to the 2nd century BC. The village has been destroyed several times by the Turks and Kurruzzen. In the 17th century Tadten came into the possession of the Esterhazy family. A Roman Catholic church was built in 1804 under Count Esterhazy. The church was enlarged in 1954 to its present size.

== Tadten national park village ==
The area south of the village up to the state border at the artificial channel Einserkanal is covered by marshy meadows of the Hanság landscape.
