= László Listi =

Hungarian poet

Count László Listi de Köpcsény et Jánosháza (List, Listi, Listh, Listhy, Liszti, Liszty, Listius; c. 1628 Nagyszeben – February 16, 1662) was a Hungarian poet.

Listi was executed for counterfeiting coins in 1662.
