= Zurndorf =

- Municipality
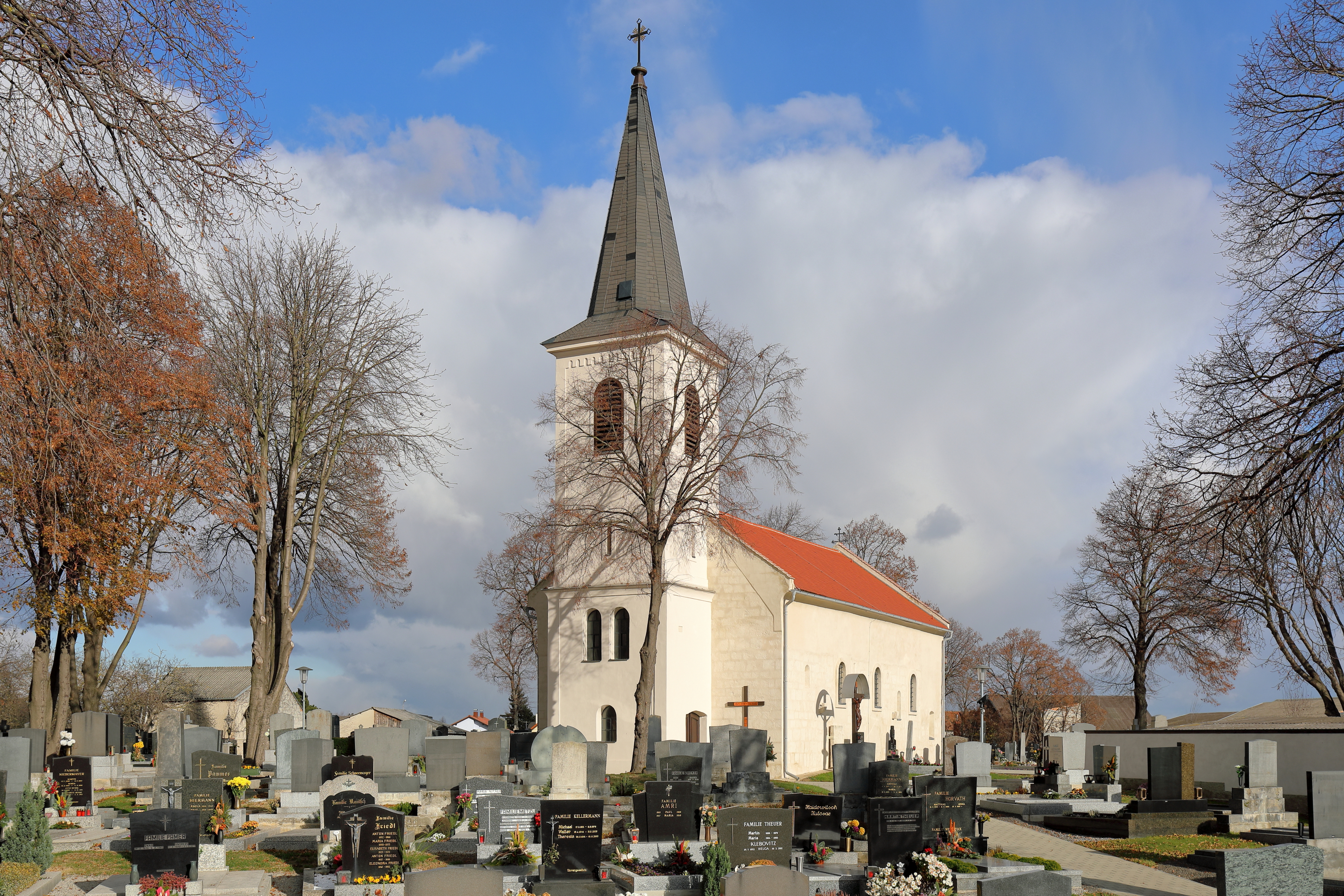
- Church of Saints Peter and Paul

- Coat of arms

- Location within Austria Zurndorf (Austria)
- Coordinates: 47°58′N 17°0′E
- Country: Austria
- State: Burgenland
- District: Neusiedl am See

Government
  - Mayor: Werner Friedl (SPÖ)

Area
  - Total: 54.29 km^{2} (20.96 sq mi)
- Elevation: 137 m (449 ft)

Population (2018-01-01)
  - Total: 2,247
  - Density: 41.39/km^{2} (107.2/sq mi)
- Time zone: UTC+1 (CET)
  - Summer (DST): UTC+2 (CEST)
- Postal code: 2424
- Website: www.zurndorf.at

Zurndorf (Hungarian: Zurány) is a town in the district of Neusiedl am See in the Austrian state of Burgenland.

== Population ==
Historical population
Year	Pop.	±%
1869	1,555	—
1880	1,695	+9.0%
1890	1,931	+13.9%
1900	2,180	+12.9%
1910	2,132	−2.2%
1923	2,153	+1.0%
1934	2,152	−0.0%
1939	2,250	+4.6%
1951	2,070	−8.0%
1961	2,087	+0.8%
1971	1,960	−6.1%
1981	1,984	+1.2%
1991	2,058	+3.7%
2001	1,993	−3.2%
2011	2,039	+2.3%
2018	2,247	+10.2%

== Personalities ==
- Hans Niessl, born there
- Ignaz Aurelius Fessler, born there
- Matthias Meixner
- Fritz Spiegl, born there
