= Wallern im Burgenland =

- Municipality
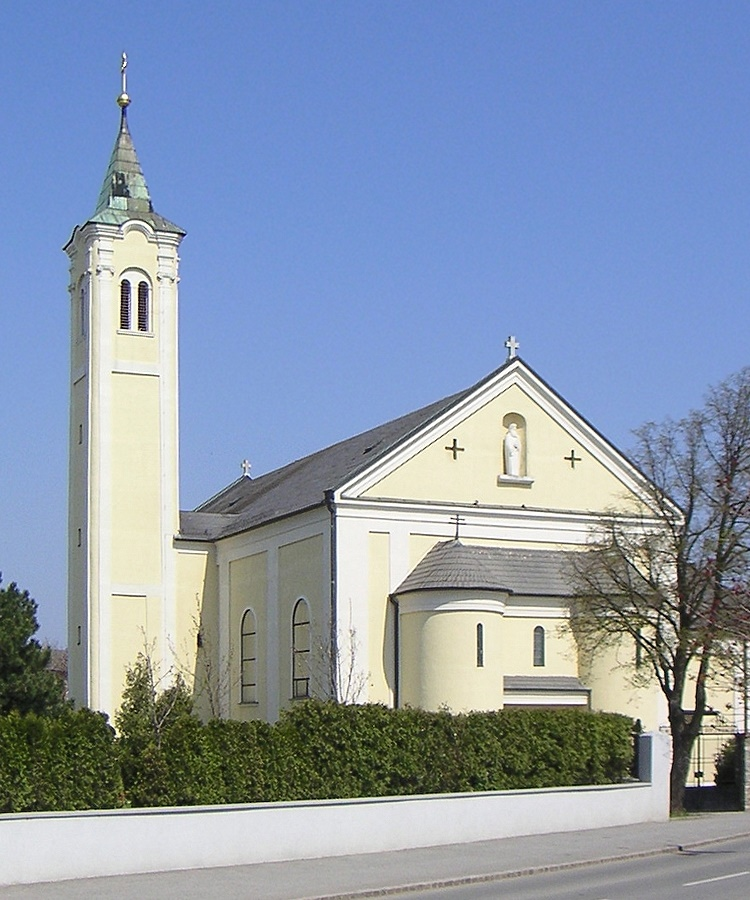
- Saint Matthew Church

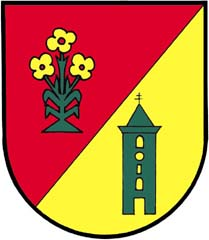
- Coat of arms

- Location within Austria
- Coordinates: 47°44′N 16°56′E
- Country: Austria
- State: Burgenland
- District: Neusiedl am See

Government
  - Mayor: Helmut Huber (SPÖ)

Area
  - Total: 33.91 km^{2} (13.09 sq mi)
- Elevation: 120 m (390 ft)

Population (2025)
  - Total: 2,006
  - Density: 59.16/km^{2} (153.2/sq mi)
- Time zone: UTC+1 (CET)
  - Summer (DST): UTC+2 (CEST)
- Postal code: 7151
- Vehicle registration: ND
- Website: https://www.marktgemeinde-wallern-im-burgenland.at/

Wallern im Burgenland (Hungarian: Valla) is a town in the northeastern part of Burgenland in Austria. It is located in the southern part of the Neusiedl am See district east of the Neusiedlersee, on Route 52 about 5 km (3.1 mi) north of the border at the artificial channel Einserkanal with Hungary.

== Population ==
Historical population
Year	Pop.	±%
1869	1,243	—
1880	1,359	+9.3%
1890	1,239	−8.8%
1900	1,347	+8.7%
1910	1,613	+19.7%
1923	1,612	−0.1%
1934	1,812	+12.4%
1939	1,878	+3.6%
1951	1,895	+0.9%
1961	2,001	+5.6%
1971	2,061	+3.0%
1981	1,996	−3.2%
1991	1,978	−0.9%
2001	1,980	+0.1%
2011	1,814	−8.4%
