= Jois =

- Municipality
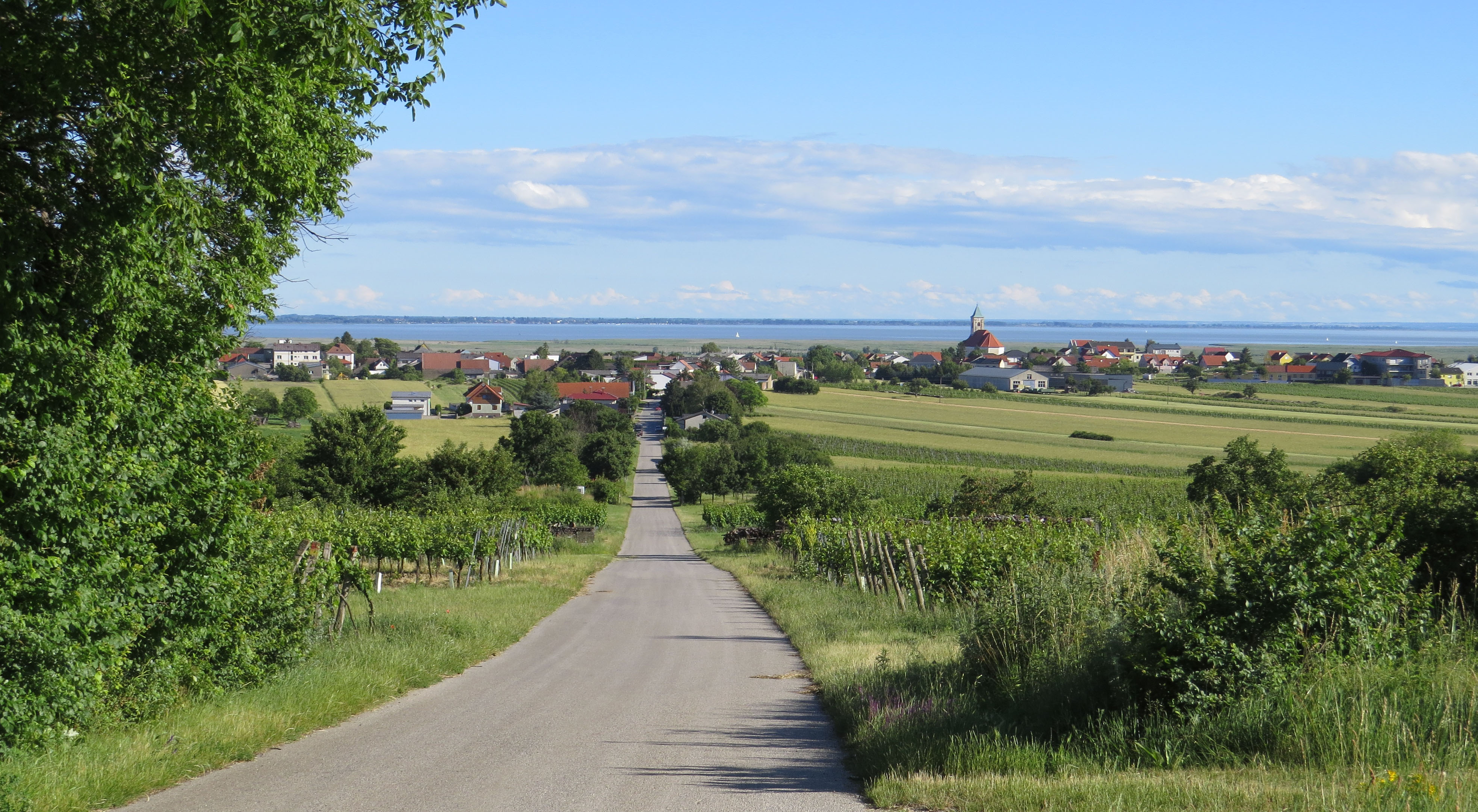
- Jois seen from the north

- Coat of arms

- Location within Austria Jois (Austria)
- Coordinates: 47°57′N 16°48′E
- Country: Austria
- State: Burgenland
- District: Neusiedl am See

Government
  - Mayor: Hannes Steurer (ÖVP)

Area
  - Total: 25.91 km^{2} (10.00 sq mi)
- Elevation: 130 m (430 ft)

Population (2018-01-01)
  - Total: 1,612
  - Density: 62.22/km^{2} (161.1/sq mi)
- Time zone: UTC+1 (CET)
  - Summer (DST): UTC+2 (CEST)
- Postal code: 7093
- Website: http://www.jois.info/de/home

Jois (German pronunciation: [jɔɪ̯s]; Hungarian: Nyulas) is a small town in the district of Neusiedl am See in Burgenland in Eastern Austria. It is on the northern shore of Lake Neusiedl, which straddles the border with Hungary.

The picturesque wine-producing area is popular with tourists, who visit Jois's parish church with its Baroque statues dating back to 1757, the local heritage museum with the district's school museum, wayside shrines, cycling trails, and the wine trail.

== Population ==
Historical population
Year	Pop.	±%
1869	1,144	—
1880	1,192	+4.2%
1890	1,235	+3.6%
1900	1,215	−1.6%
1910	1,287	+5.9%
1923	1,220	−5.2%
1934	1,313	+7.6%
1939	1,374	+4.6%
1951	1,305	−5.0%
1961	1,295	−0.8%
1971	1,270	−1.9%
1981	1,284	+1.1%
1991	1,277	−0.5%
2001	1,310	+2.6%
2011	1,446	+10.4%
