= Inositol 3-alpha-galactosyltransferase =

InterPro Family

Identifiers
- EC no.: 2.4.1.123
- CAS no.: 79955-89-8

Databases
- IntEnz: IntEnz view
- BRENDA: BRENDA entry
- ExPASy: NiceZyme view
- KEGG: KEGG entry
- MetaCyc: metabolic pathway
- PRIAM: profile
- PDB structures: RCSB PDB PDBe PDBsum
- Gene Ontology: AmiGO / QuickGO
Search
- PMC: articles
- PubMed: articles
- NCBI: proteins

Inositol 3-alpha-galactosyltransferase (EC 2.4.1.123) is an enzyme that catalyzes the chemical reaction

inositol
+ UDP-galactose
UDP
galactinol

The two substrates of this enzyme characterised from cucumber are inositol (myo-inositol) and UDP-galactose. Its products are galactinol and uridine diphosphate (UDP).

This enzyme belongs to the family of glycosyltransferases, specifically the hexosyltransferases. The systematic name of this enzyme class is UDP-galactose:myo-inositol 3-alpha-D-galactosyltransferase. Other names in common use include UDP-D-galactose:inositol galactosyltransferase, UDP-galactose:myo-inositol 1-alpha-D-galactosyltransferase, UDPgalactose:myo-inositol 1-alpha-D-galactosyltransferase, galactinol synthase, inositol 1-alpha-galactosyltransferase, and uridine diphosphogalactose-inositol galactosyltransferase. This enzyme participates in galactose metabolism.
