= Deutsch Jahrndorf =

- Municipality
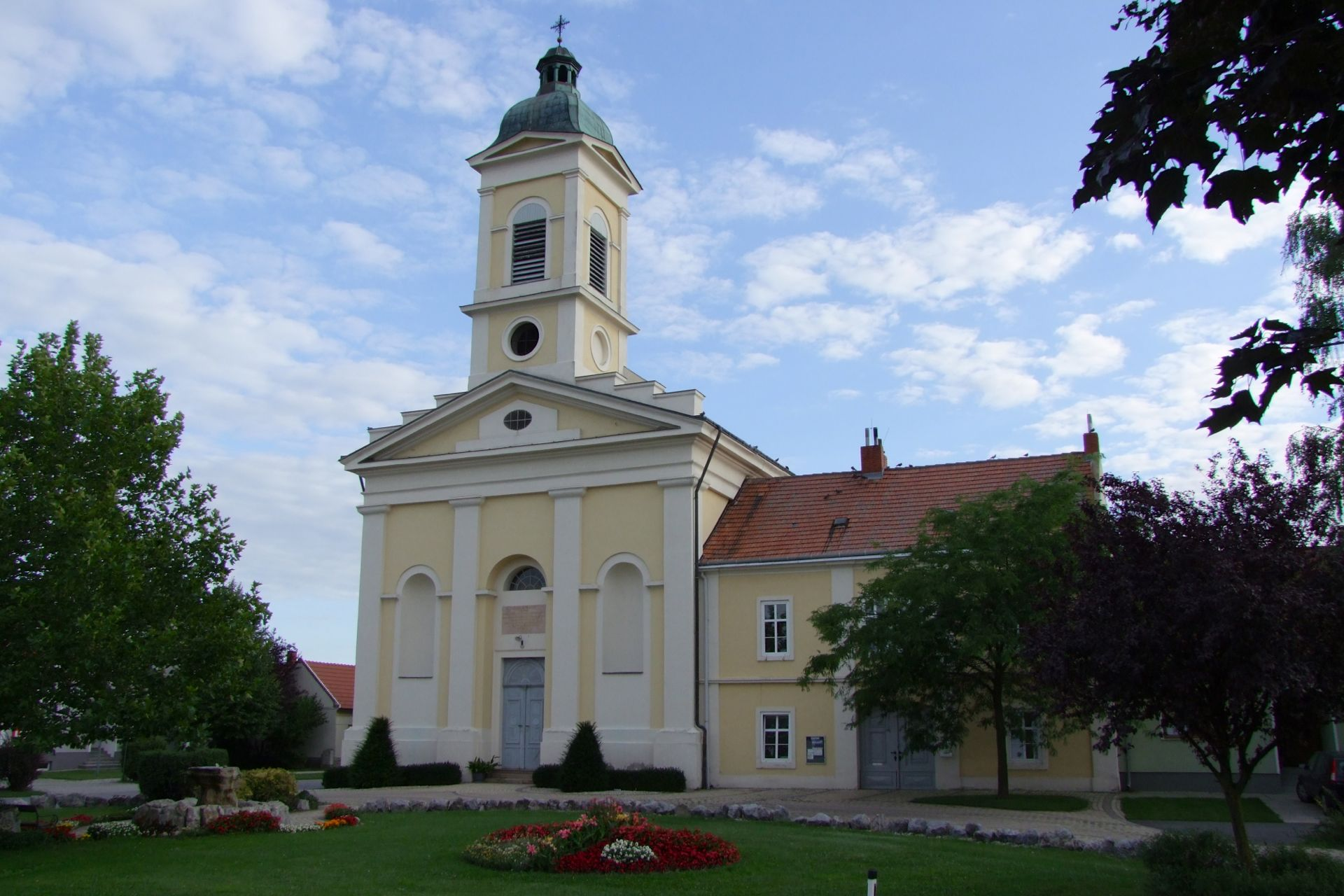
- Lutheran church

- Coat of arms
- Interactive map of Deutsch Jahrndorf
- Location within Burgenland Location within Austria
- Coordinates: 48°1′N 17°6′E
- Country: Austria
- State: Burgenland
- District: Neusiedl am See

Government
  - Mayor: Gerhard Bachmann (SPÖ)

Area
  - Total: 27.43 km^{2} (10.59 sq mi)

Population (2016-01-01)
  - Total: 611
  - Density: 22.3/km^{2} (57.7/sq mi)
- Time zone: UTC+1 (CET)
  - Summer (DST): UTC+2 (CEST)
- Postal code: 2423
- Website: http://www.deutsch-jahrndorf.at/startseite/

Deutsch Jahrndorf (German pronunciation: [ˌdɔʏtʃ ˈjaːɐ̯ndɔʁf]; Hungarian: Németjárfalu, Német-Járfalu, Slovak: Nemecké Jarovce) is a municipality in the district of Neusiedl am See, in the Austrian state of Burgenland. It is within a few kilometres of the borders of both Hungary and Slovakia. Deutsch Jahrndorf is the easternmost municipality of Austria, at 17th meridian east, and the easternmost commune of the German Sprachraum since 1945 and the expulsions of the Germans.

== History ==
With Burgenland, the former Hungarian village passed to the Republic of Austria after World War I. During the Cold War, or from shortly after World War II until the Revolutions of 1989, Deutsch Jahrndorf was the easternmost community in Central Europe with a Western market economy. It lies further to the east than all of the former East Germany and is further east than parts of Poland, Hungary and the then-Czechoslovakia (being the vast majority of the modern day Czech Republic and a small part of Slovakia), each of which were communist countries behind the "Iron Curtain".

== Population ==
Historical population
Year	Pop.	±%
1869	767	—
1880	834	+8.7%
1890	862	+3.4%
1900	960	+11.4%
1910	923	−3.9%
1923	977	+5.9%
1934	1,165	+19.2%
1939	1,343	+15.3%
1951	1,132	−15.7%
1961	889	−21.5%
1971	745	−16.2%
1981	670	−10.1%
1991	643	−4.0%
2001	567	−11.8%
2011	608	+7.2%

== Politics ==
Seats in the municipal assembly (Gemeinderat) as of 2007 elections:

- Social Democratic Party of Austria (SPÖ): 6
- Austrian People's Party (ÖVP): 5
- Freedom Party of Austria (FPÖ): 2

== International relations ==
=== Twin towns — Sister cities ===
Deutsch Jahrndorf is twinned with:

- Hamuliakovo, Slovakia
- Rajka, Hungary

== See also ==
- Jarovce
