= Parndorf =

- Municipality
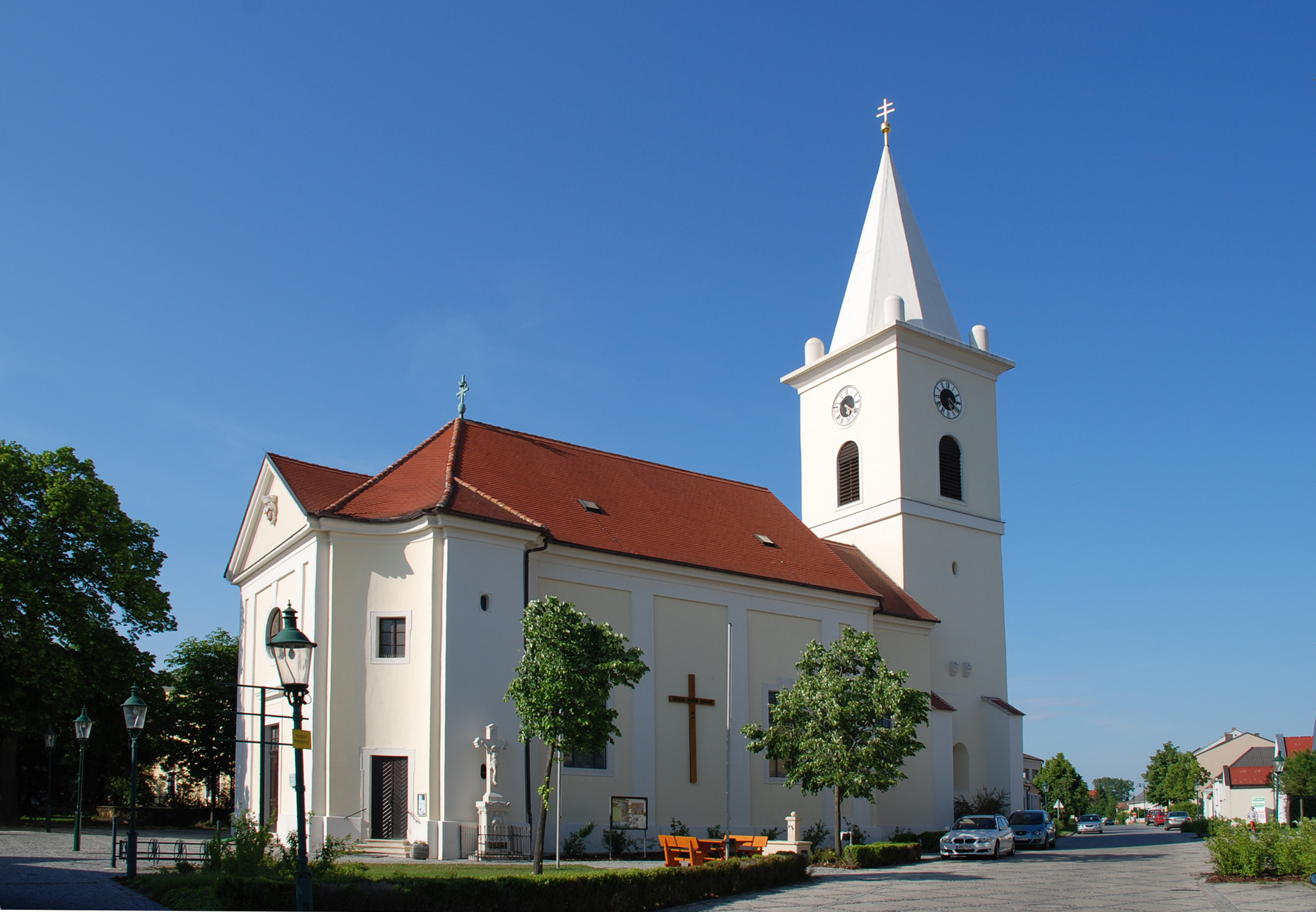
- Church of Saint Ladislaus

- Coat of arms

- Location within Austria
- Coordinates: 47°58′N 16°51′E
- Country: Austria
- State: Burgenland
- District: Neusiedl am See

Government
  - Mayor: Wolfgang Kovacs (LIPA)

Area
  - Total: 59.29 km^{2} (22.89 sq mi)
- Elevation: 182 m (597 ft)

Population (2018-01-01)
  - Total: 4,689
  - Density: 79.09/km^{2} (204.8/sq mi)
- Time zone: UTC+1 (CET)
  - Summer (DST): UTC+2 (CEST)
- Postal code: 7111
- Area code: 02166

Parndorf (Hungarian: Pándorfalu, Croatian: Pandrof) is a town in the district of Neusiedl am See in the Austrian state of Burgenland. Its original ancient name Perun is derived from the Slavic deity Perun.

== Population ==
Historical population
Year	Pop.	±%
1869	2,477	—
1880	2,556	+3.2%
1890	2,424	−5.2%
1900	2,720	+12.2%
1910	2,780	+2.2%
1923	2,665	−4.1%
1934	2,833	+6.3%
1939	3,203	+13.1%
1951	2,422	−24.4%
1961	2,390	−1.3%
1971	2,383	−0.3%
1981	2,352	−1.3%
1991	2,648	+12.6%
2001	3,218	+21.5%
2011	4,170	+29.6%

== Transport ==
The Pannonia Railway had a station in the community. This links up with the Parndorf–Bratislava railway line.
