= Weiden am See =

- Municipality
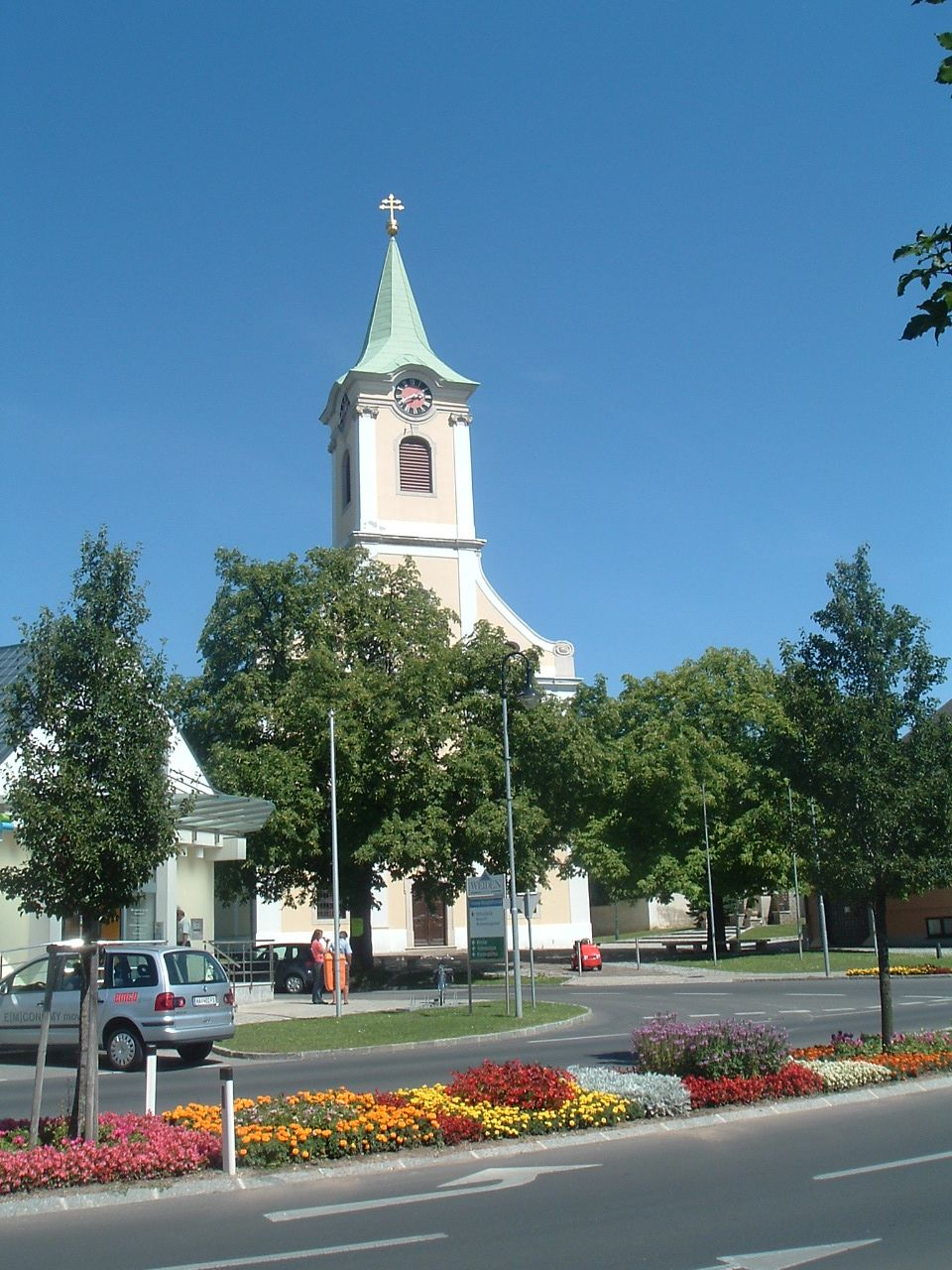
- Holy Trinity Church

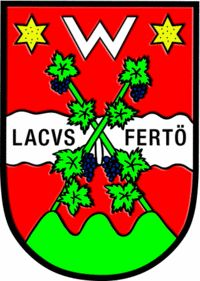
- Coat of arms

- Location within Austria
- Coordinates: 47°55′N 16°52′E
- Country: Austria
- State: Burgenland
- District: Neusiedl am See

Government
  - Mayor: Wilhelm Schwartz (ÖVP)

Area
  - Total: 32.51 km^{2} (12.55 sq mi)
- Elevation: 127 m (417 ft)

Population (2018-01-01)
  - Total: 2,426
  - Density: 74.62/km^{2} (193.3/sq mi)
- Time zone: UTC+1 (CET)
  - Summer (DST): UTC+2 (CEST)
- Postal code: 7121
- Website: www.weiden-see.at

Weiden am See (Hungarian: Védeny) is a town in the district of Neusiedl am See in the Austrian state of Burgenland.

== Population ==
Historical population
Year	Pop.	±%
1869	1,033	—
1880	1,176	+13.8%
1890	1,301	+10.6%
1900	1,368	+5.1%
1910	1,364	−0.3%
1923	1,475	+8.1%
1934	1,656	+12.3%
1939	1,704	+2.9%
1951	1,678	−1.5%
1961	1,685	+0.4%
1971	1,701	+0.9%
1981	1,704	+0.2%
1991	1,875	+10.0%
2001	1,922	+2.5%
2011	2,241	+16.6%
