= Gattendorf, Austria =

Gattendorf Lajtakáta, Lajtha-Káta
- Municipality
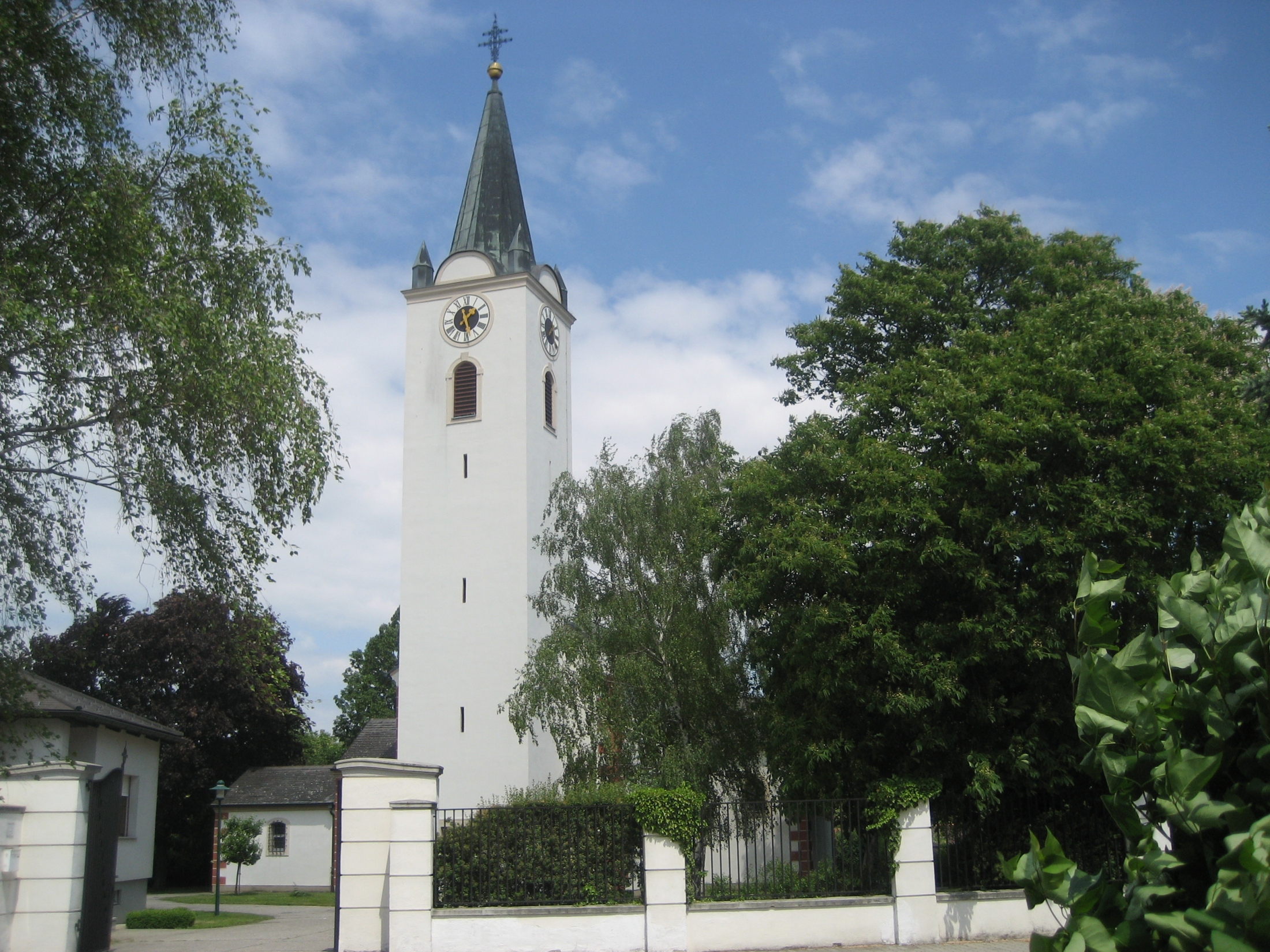
- Holy Trinity Church

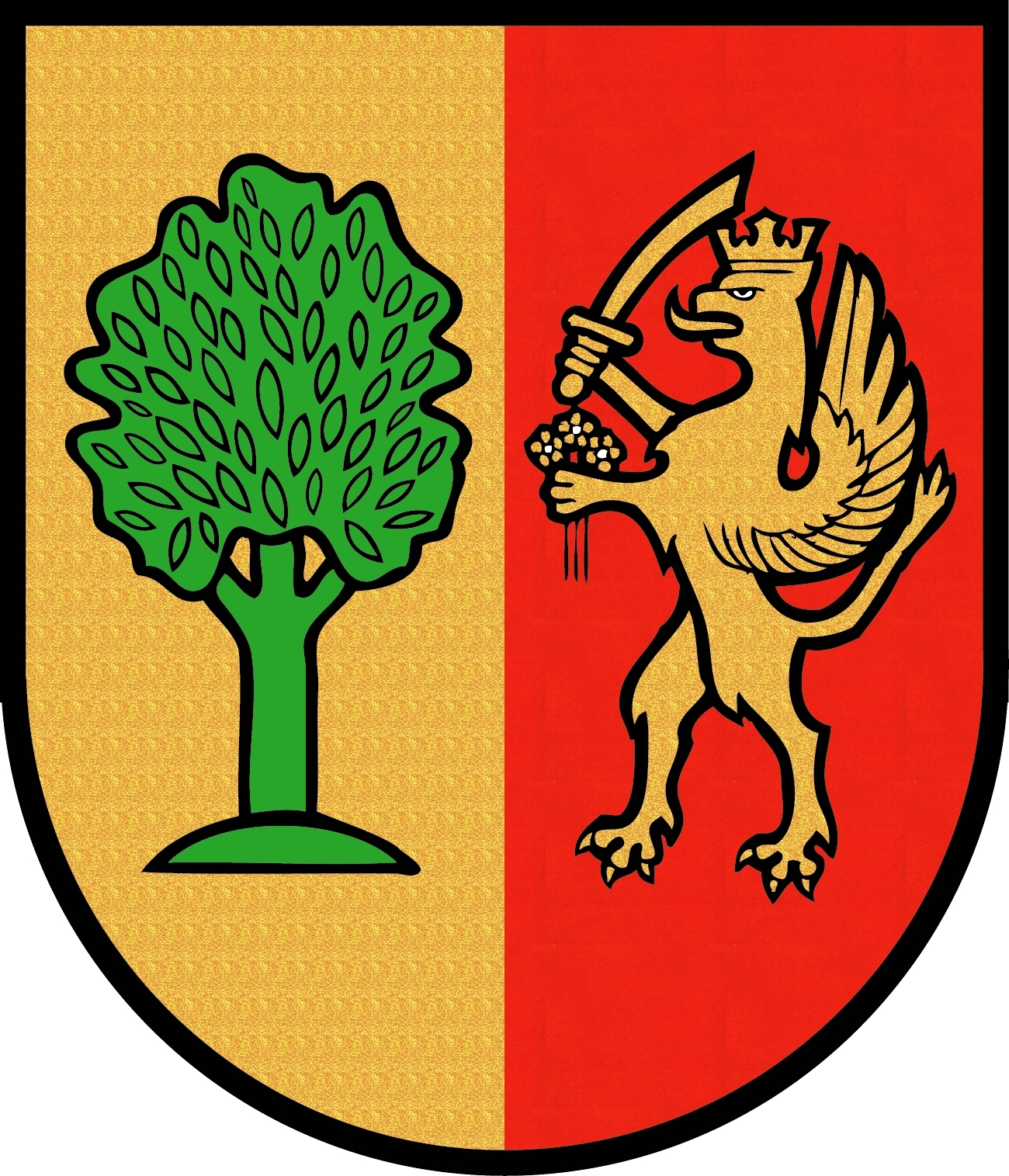
- Coat of arms

- Location within Austria
- Coordinates: 48°1′N 16°58′E
- Country: Austria
- State: Burgenland
- District: Neusiedl am See

Area
  - Total: 25.13 km^{2} (9.70 sq mi)

Population (2018-01-01)
  - Total: 1,332
- Postal code: 2474
- Website: www.gattendorf.at

Gattendorf (Austrian German pronunciation: [ˈɡatn̩dɔrf]; Hungarian: Lajtakáta, Lajtha-Káta; Croatian: Raušer) is a town in the district of Neusiedl am See in the Austrian state of Burgenland.

It is also known as Raušer to its Croatian-speaking minority population.

== Population ==
Historical population
Year	Pop.	±%
1869	1,173	—
1880	1,274	+8.6%
1890	1,277	+0.2%
1900	1,341	+5.0%
1910	1,105	−17.6%
1923	1,132	+2.4%
1934	1,168	+3.2%
1939	1,204	+3.1%
1951	1,172	−2.7%
1961	1,101	−6.1%
1971	1,090	−1.0%
1981	1,059	−2.8%
1991	1,045	−1.3%
2001	1,120	+7.2%
2011	1,196	+6.8%
