= Mönchhof =

- Municipality
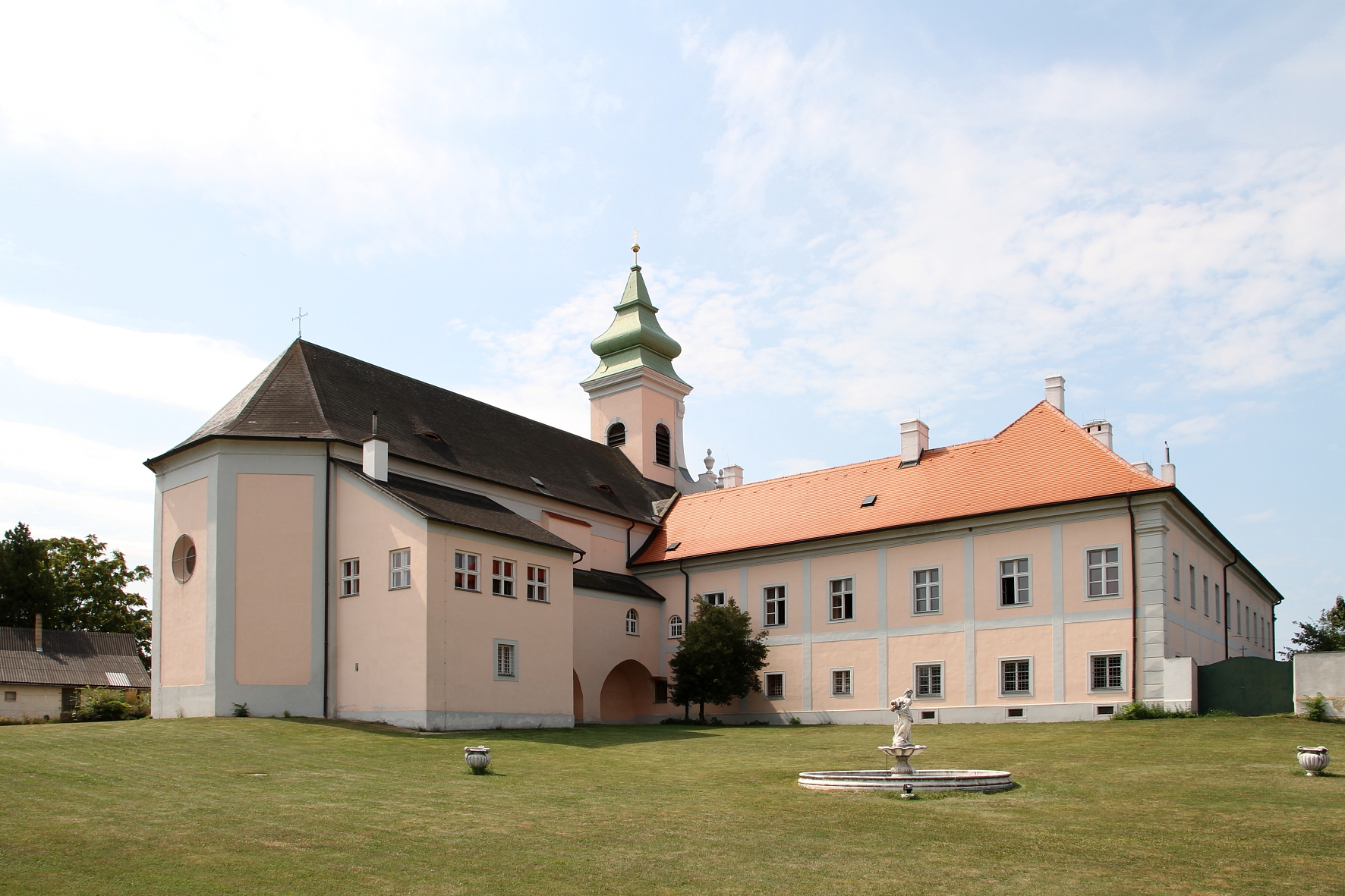
- Former monastery

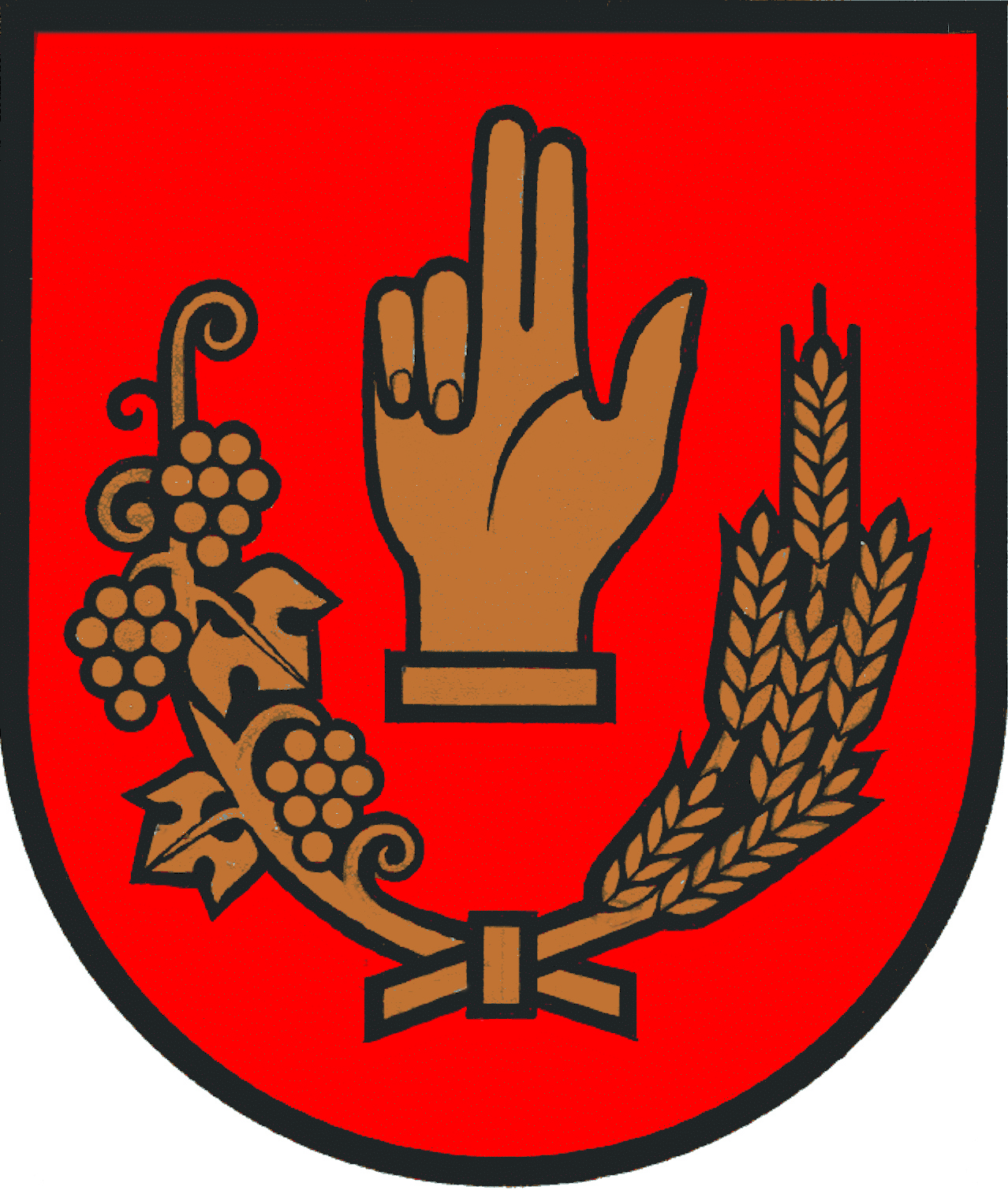
- Coat of arms

- Location within Austria
- Coordinates: 47°53′N 16°57′E
- Country: Austria
- State: Burgenland
- District: Neusiedl am See

Government
  - Mayor: Josef Kolby (ÖVP)

Area
  - Total: 33.56 km^{2} (12.96 sq mi)
- Elevation: 131 m (430 ft)

Population (2018-01-01)
  - Total: 2,236
  - Density: 66.63/km^{2} (172.6/sq mi)
- Time zone: UTC+1 (CET)
  - Summer (DST): UTC+2 (CEST)
- Postal code: 7123
- Website: www.moenchhof.at

Mönchhof (Hungarian: Barátudvar) is a town in the district of Neusiedl am See in the Austrian state of Burgenland.

== Population ==
Historical population
Year	Pop.	±%
1869	1,464	—
1880	1,609	+9.9%
1890	1,532	−4.8%
1900	1,648	+7.6%
1910	1,780	+8.0%
1923	1,761	−1.1%
1934	2,038	+15.7%
1939	2,098	+2.9%
1951	2,126	+1.3%
1961	2,182	+2.6%
1971	2,220	+1.7%
1981	2,195	−1.1%
1991	2,182	−0.6%
2001	2,257	+3.4%
2011	2,286	+1.3%
