= Gols (town) =

- Municipality
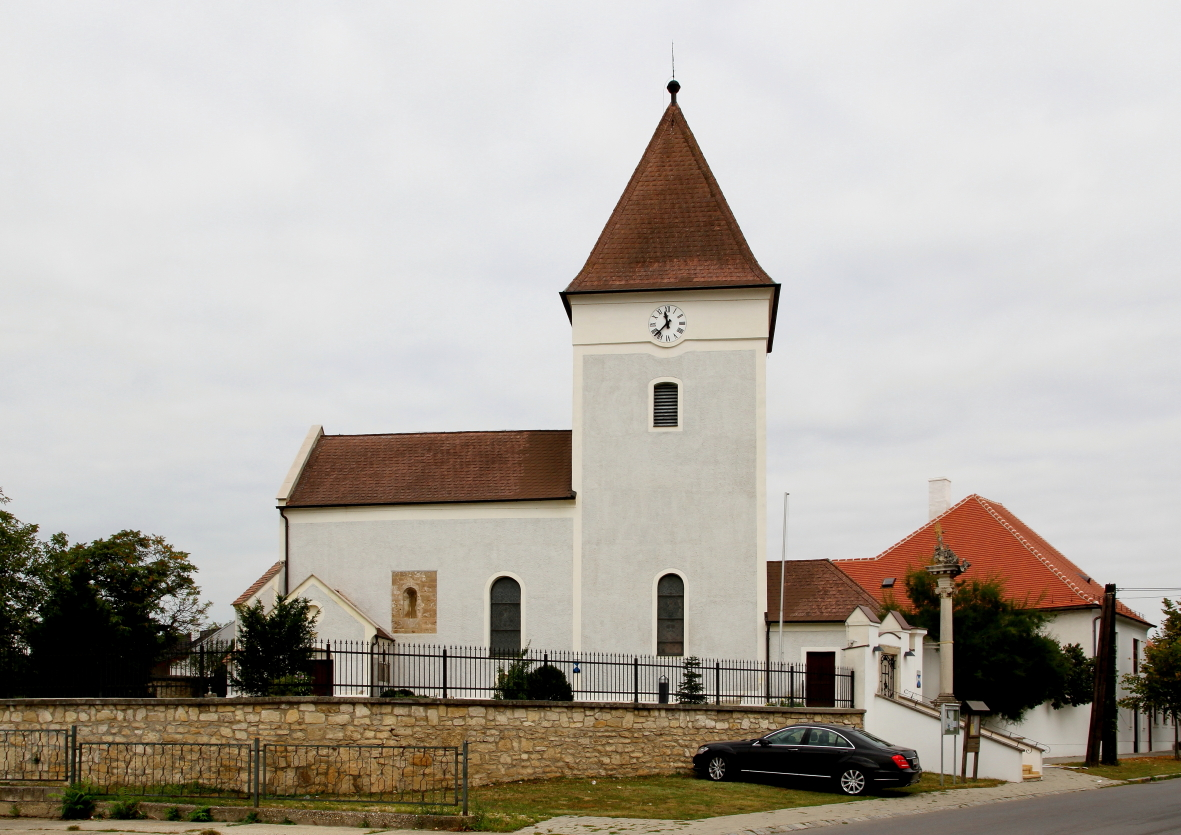
- Church of Saint James, the Elder

- Coat of arms

- Location within Austria
- Coordinates: 47°54′N 16°55′E
- Country: Austria
- State: Burgenland
- District: Neusiedl am See

Government
  - Mayor: Kilian Brandstätter (SPÖ)

Area
  - Total: 42.23 km^{2} (16.31 sq mi)
- Elevation: 130 m (430 ft)

Population (2018-01-01)
  - Total: 3,835
  - Density: 90.81/km^{2} (235.2/sq mi)
- Time zone: UTC+1 (CET)
  - Summer (DST): UTC+2 (CEST)
- Postal code: 7122
- Area code: 2173
- Website: www.gols.at

Gols (German pronunciation: [ɡɔls]; Hungarian: Gálos, Croatian: Gojza, Central Bavarian: Guis or Guüs) is a town in the district of Neusiedl am See in the Austrian state of Burgenland.

== Population ==
Historical population
Year	Pop.	±%
1869	2,092	—
1880	2,277	+8.8%
1890	2,328	+2.2%
1900	2,318	−0.4%
1910	2,375	+2.5%
1923	2,606	+9.7%
1934	2,943	+12.9%
1939	3,051	+3.7%
1951	3,126	+2.5%
1961	3,120	−0.2%
1971	3,287	+5.4%
1981	3,368	+2.5%
1991	3,429	+1.8%
2001	3,516	+2.5%
2011	3,698	+5.2%
