= List of tunnels in Switzerland =

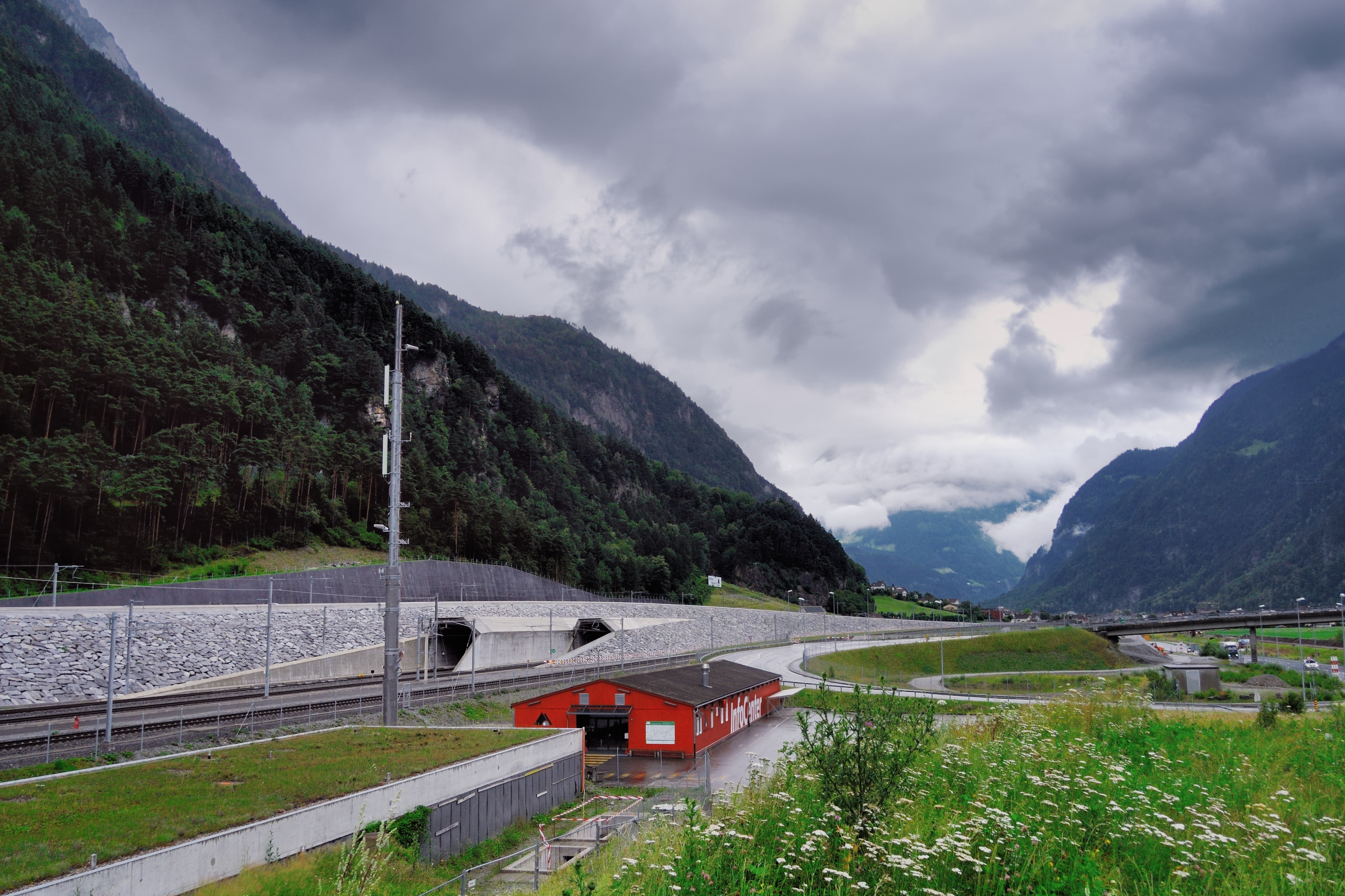
The Gotthard Base Tunnel became the world's longest railway tunnel upon opening in 2016.

This list of tunnels in Switzerland includes all notable road, rail, waterway, or other tunnels in Switzerland.

Name	Length (km)	Type	Route	Notes
Adler Tunnel	5.302	rail	Swiss Federal Railways Hauenstein line	Opened 4 December 2000
Aescher Tunnel	2.176	road	A4 motorway	
Albula Tunnel	5.865	rail	Rhaetian Railway Albula line	
Arrissoules Tunnel	2.987	road	A1 motorway	
Baregg Tunnel	1.390	road	A1 motorway	
Belchen Tunnel	3.180	road	A2 motorway	
Bözberg Rail Tunnel	2.526	rail	Swiss Federal Railways Bözberg railway line	
Bözberg Road Tunnel	3.705	road	A3 motorway	
Bubenholz Tunnel	0.550	road	A51 motorway	
Bure Tunnel	3.059	road	A16 motorway	
Cassanawald Tunnel	1.230	road	A13 motorway	
Ceneri Base Tunnel	15.4	rail	Swiss Federal Railways Gotthard line	Opened on 4 September 2020
Crapteig Tunnel	2.171	road	A13 motorway	
Cholfirst Tunnel	1.260	road	A4 motorway	
Felskinn–Mittelallalin Tunnel	1.749	rail	Metro Alpin	Funicular railway, entirely in tunnel
Furka Base Tunnel	15.407	rail	Matterhorn Gotthard Bahn Furka–Oberalp line	With car transport
Furka Summit Tunnel	1.858	rail	Furka Cogwheel Steam Railway	Superseded by the Furka Base Tunnel, now used by a heritage railway
Giswil Tunnel	2.066	road	A8 motorway	
Girsberg Tunnel	1.770	road	A7 motorway	
Glion Tunnel	1.350	road	A9 motorway	
Gotthard Base Tunnel	57.104	rail	Swiss Federal Railways Gotthard line	Opened on 1 June 2016
Gotthard Rail Tunnel	15.003	rail	Swiss Federal Railways Gotthard line	
Gotthard Road Tunnel	16.942	road	A2 motorway	
Grauholz Tunnel	6.295	rail	Swiss Federal Railways Olten–Lausanne line	
Great St Bernard Tunnel	5.798	road		
Grenchenberg Tunnel	8.578	rail	BLS AG Grenchenberg line	
Gubrist Tunnel	3.273	road	A1 motorway	
Hauenstein Base Tunnel	8.134	rail	Swiss Federal Railways Hauenstein line	
Hauenstein Summit Tunnel	2.495	rail	Swiss Federal Railways Hauenstein line	
Heitersberg Tunnel	4.929	rail	Swiss Federal Railways Heitersberg line	
Hirschengraben Tunnel	2.148	rail	Swiss Federal Railways Lake Zürich right-bank line	
Jungfrau Tunnel	7.122	rail	Jungfrau Railway	Rack railway, mostly in tunnel
Käferberg Tunnel	2.119	rail	Swiss Federal Railways Zürich–Winterthur line	
Kerenzerberg Rail Tunnel	3.955	rail	Swiss Federal Railways Ziegelbrücke–Sargans line	
Kerenzerberg Road Tunnel	5.760	road	A3 motorway	
Large Hadron Collider	27	sui generis	CERN near Geneva	Contains the world's largest and most powerful particle collider. It is a circular loop under the territories of both Switzerland and France.
Letten Tunnel	2.093	rail	Swiss Federal Railways Lake Zürich right-bank line	Superseded by Hirschengraben Tunnel, now disused
Lötschberg Base Tunnel	34.57	rail	BLS AG Lötschberg line	Opened on 14 June 2007
Lötschberg Tunnel	14.612	rail	BLS AG Lötschberg line	
Lopper I Rail Tunnel	1.186	rail	Zentralbahn Brünig line	
Lopper II Rail Tunnel	1.743	rail	Zentralbahn Luzern–Stans–Engelberg line	
Lopper Road Tunnel	1.590	road	A8 motorway	
Mappo–Morettina Tunnel	5.518	road	A13 motorway	
Maroggia Tunnel	0.569	rail	Swiss Federal Railways Gotthard line	
Milchbuck Tunnel	1.910	road	A1L motorway	
Mont d'Or Tunnel	6.099	rail	Réseau Ferré de France Dijon–Vallorbe-Lausanne SBB TGV line	between Switzerland and France
Monte Ceneri Rail Tunnel	1.692	rail	Swiss Federal Railways Gotthard line	Twin single-track tunnels: Monte Ceneri I is 1675m in length; Monte Ceneri II is 1692m in length.
Monte Ceneri Road Tunnel	1.412	road	A2 motorway	
Munt la Schera Tunnel	3.394	road		
Ricken Tunnel	8.603	rail	Swiss Federal Railways Uznach–Wattwil line	
Rosenberg Tunnel	1.466	rail	Swiss Federal Railways Winterthur–Rorschach line	
Rosenberg Tunnel	1.450	road	A1 Motorway	
Sachseln Tunnel	5.213	road	A8 Motorway	
San Bernardino Tunnel	6.596	road	A13 motorway	
San Nicolao Tunnel	0.680	road	A2 motorway	
Schöneich Tunnel	0.6	road	A1L Motorway	
Seelisberg Tunnel	9.292	road	A2 Motorway	
Sierre Tunnel	2.460	road	A9 Motorway	
Simplon Tunnel	19.824	rail	Swiss Federal Railways Simplon line	Between Switzerland and Italy
Sonnenberg Tunnel	1.550	road	A2 Motorway	
Vereina Tunnel	19.058	rail	Rhaetian Railway Vereina line	With car transport
Wasserfluh Tunnel	3.556	rail	Südostbahn Bodensee–Toggenburg line	
Weinberg Tunnel	4.8	rail	Swiss Federal Railways Altstetten–Zürich–Oerlikon cross-city line	
Wipkingen Tunnel	1.2	rail	Swiss Federal Railways Zürich–Winterthur line	Extended from 0.959 km in the 1990s
Zermatt–Sunnegga Tunnel	1.545	rail	SunneggaExpress	Funicular railway, entirely in tunnel
Zimmerberg Base Tunnel	9.4	rail	Swiss Federal Railways Gotthard line	
Zimmerberg Tunnel	1.984	rail	Swiss Federal Railways Thalwil–Arth-Goldau line	Single-track, built 1897
Zürichberg Tunnel	5	rail	Swiss Federal Railways Zürichberg line	

== See also ==
- List of tunnels by location
- List of tunnels in the Alps
- List of tunnels in Austria
