= List of tunnels in the Alps =

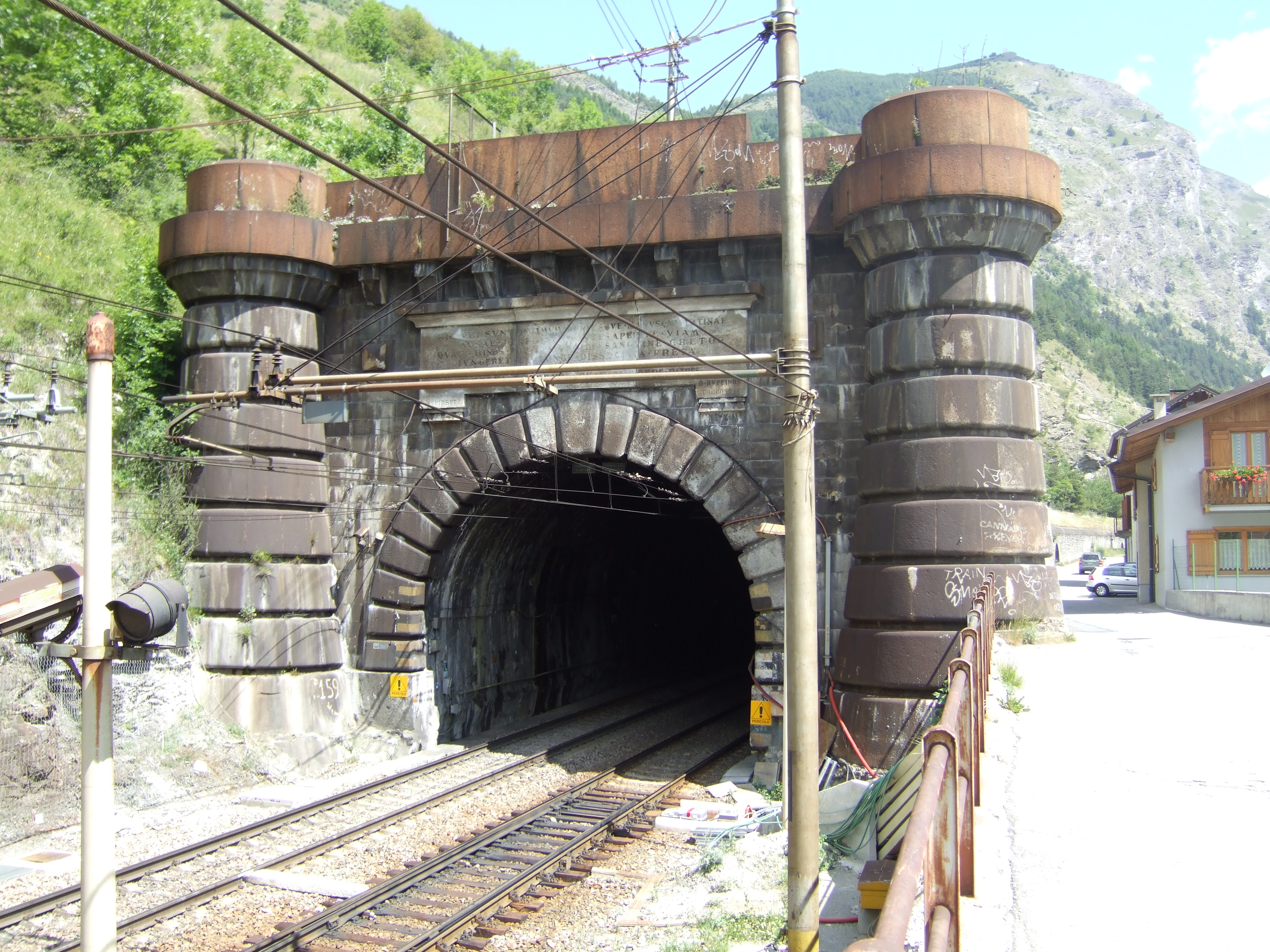
The entrance to Mont Cenis tunnel from the Italian side (Bardonecchia)

There are a large number of tunnels in the Alps of Central Europe. They have the advantage of providing shorter routes and faster journey times by avoiding narrow, winding routes over mountain passes which may well be affected by winter conditions. This list is intended to give an overview of the main Alpine tunnels. As the list is "country" oriented, cross-border tunnels are listed twice (e.g. the Mont Blanc tunnel is listed under France and under Italy.)

See separate article for a list of the longest tunnels in the world.

== Austria ==
=== Vorarlberg ===
- Achrain Tunnel (3,340 m)
- Amberg Tunnel (2,978 m)
- Arlberg Road Tunnel (13,972 m)
- Arlberg Tunnel (10,249 m, railway tunnel)
- Erzberg Tunnel (5,700 m, in planning)
- Langen Tunnel (2,433 m)
- Letze Tunnel (2,612 m, in planning)
- Pfänder Tunnel (6,718 m)

=== Tyrol ===
- Arlberg Road Tunnel (13,972 m)
- Arlberg Railway Tunnel (10,249 m, railway tunnel)
- Brandberg Tunnel (2,130 m)
- Felbertauern Tunnel (5,304 m)
- Inntal Tunnel (12,696 m, railway tunnel only for goods traffic)
- Harpfnerwand Tunnel (2,590 m)
- Landecker Tunnel (6,955 m)
- Lermoos Tunnel (3,168 m)
- Perjen Tunnel (2,993 m)
- Pianner/Quadratscher Tunnel
- Roppener Tunnel (5,095 m)
- Strenger Tunnel (5,851 m)
- Tschirgant Tunnel (4,310 m, under construction)

=== Salzburg ===
- Felbertauern Tunnel (5,304 m)
- Ofenauer Tunnel (1,390 m)
- Hiefler Tunnel (2,004 m)
- Katschberg Tunnel (5,439 m)
- Schmitten Tunnel (5,111 m)
- Schönberg Tunnel (2,988 m)
- Tauern Road Tunnel (6,401 m)
- Tauern Railway Tunnel (8,550 m)

=== Carinthia ===
- Ehrentalerberg (3,345 m)
- Gräbern Tunnel (2,148 m)
- Karawanken Tunnel (railway) (7,976 m)
- Karawanken Tunnel (motorway) (7,864 m)
- Koralm Tunnel (32,900 m, railway)
- Katschberg Tunnel (5,439 m)
- Oswaldiberg Tunnel (4,307 m)

=== Upper Austria ===
- Bartl Kreuz Tunnel (2,000 m)
- Bosruck Tunnel (5,500 m)
- Geißwand Tunnel (2,102 m, under construction)
- Klaus Tunnel (2,144 m)
- Lainberg Tunnel (2,278 m)
- Pfaffenboden Tunnel (3,430 m)
- Spering Tunnel (2,852 m)
- Unterweitersdorfer Berg Tunnel (4,500 m, in planning)

=== Lower Austria ===
- Semmering Scheitel Tunnel (3,489 m)
- Wienerwald Tunnel (13,350 m)

=== Styria ===
- Bosruck Tunnel (5,500 m)
- Falkenberg Tunnel (3,000 m, in planning)
- Ganzstein Semmering Tunnel (3,489 m)
- Ganzstein Tunnel (2,135 m)
- Gleinalm Tunnel (8,320 m)
- Gratkorn Tunnel Nord and Süd (635m / 660m, 798m / 786m)
- Herzogberg Tunnel (2,007 m)
- Koralm Tunnel (32,900 m, railway)
- Plabutsch Tunnel (9,919 m)
- Pretallerkogel Tunnel (446m / 535m)
- Schartnerkogel Tunnel (1,167m / 1,232m)
- Selzthal Tunnel (1,010m / 964m)
- Spital Tunnel (2,597 m)
- Tanzenberg Tunnel (2,523 m)
- Bruck Tunnel (1237m/1250m)
- Rottenmann Tunnel (400m)
- Wald Tunnel (2,924 m)

=== Vienna ===
- Lainzer Tunnel (12,800 m, railway tunnel under construction)
- Wienerwald Tunnel (13,350 m)

== France ==
- Mont Cenis Tunnel (railway) and Fréjus road tunnel
- Mont Blanc Tunnel (road tunnel)
- Simplon Tunnel (railway tunnel)
- Tenda Tunnels (road and railway)
- Col de Tende Road Tunnel (one of the oldest long road tunnels, 3.2 km)
- Buco di Viso (mule track, oldest tunnel in the Alps)
- Fréjus Road Tunnel and the much older Fréjus Railway Tunnel

== Germany ==
- Füssen Border Tunnel

== Italy ==
- Mont Cenis Tunnel (railway) and Fréjus road tunnel
- Great St Bernard Tunnel (Gran San Bernardo / Grosser Sankt Bernhard, road tunnel)
- Mont Blanc Tunnel (road tunnel through the highest mountain in the Alps)
- Simplon Tunnel (railway tunnel)
- Tenda Tunnels (road and railway)
- Col de Tende Road Tunnel (one of the oldest long road tunnels, 3.2 km)
- Monte Viso Tunnel (Buco di Viso, mule track, oldest tunnel in the Alps)
- Fréjus Road Tunnel and the much older Fréjus Rail Tunnel

== Slovenia ==
- Karawanken Tunnel (motorway)
- Karawanken Tunnel (railway)

== Switzerland ==
See also: List of tunnels in Switzerland

=== Longest tunnels ===
- Gotthard Base Tunnel (railway tunnel, open on 1 June 2016, 57 km)
- Lötschberg Base Tunnel (railway tunnel, 34.6 km)
- Simplon Tunnel (railway tunnel, 19.8 km)
- Vereina Tunnel (narrow gauge railway tunnel with car transportation, 19 km)
- Gotthard Road Tunnel (road tunnel, 16.9 km)
- Ceneri Base Tunnel (railway tunnel, 15.4 km)
- Furka Base Tunnel (narrow gauge railway tunnel with car transportation, 15.4 km)
- Gotthard Railway Tunnel (railway tunnel, 15.0 km)
- Lötschberg Tunnel (railway tunnel, 14.6 km)
- Zimmerberg Base Tunnel (railway tunnel, 9.4 km)
- Seelisberg Tunnel (road tunnel, 9.2 km)
- Ricken Tunnel (railway tunnel, 8.6 km)

=== Other well-known tunnels ===
- San Bernardino Tunnel (road tunnel, 6.6 km)
- Great St Bernard Tunnel (road tunnel, 5.9 km)
- Albula Tunnel (narrow gauge railway tunnel, 5.9 km)
- Furka Summit Tunnel (narrow gauge railway tunnel, heritage railway, 1.9 km)
- Munt la Schera Tunnel (road tunnel)

== See also ==
- Tunnel
- List of tunnels in Switzerland
- List of tunnels in Austria
- List of longest tunnels

== Sources ==
- Uwe A. Oster (ed.), Wege über die Alpen. Von der Frühzeit bis heute, Darmstadt, 2006, ISBN 3-89678-269-X.
- www.AlpenTunnel.de Historic railway crossings through the Alps
