= List of tunnels in Austria =

This list of tunnels in Austria includes any road, rail or waterway tunnel in Austria.

- Amberg Tunnel
- Arlbergtunnel (railway)
- Arlbergtunnel (road)
- Bosruck Tunnel
- Felbertauern Tunnel
- Ganzstein Tunnel
- Gleinalm Tunnel
- Pfänder Tunnel
- Karawanken Tunnel (Karavankentunnel)
- Katschberg Road Tunnel
- Koralm Tunnel
- Plabutsch Tunnel
- Schmitten Tunnel, Zell am See.
- Sigmundstor, Salzburg
- Tauern Road Tunnel
- Tauern Railway Tunnel

== See also ==
- List of tunnels by location
- List of tunnels in the Alps
- List of tunnels in Switzerland
- operation Silver (1949)
