= Lopper Tunnel =

Lopper Tunnel may refer to:

- Lopper I Rail Tunnel, a Swiss rail tunnel connecting Hergiswil with Alpnach as part of the Brünig line
- Lopper II Rail Tunnel, a Swiss rail tunnel connecting Hergiswil with Stans as part of the Luzern–Stans–Engelberg line
- Lopper Road Tunnel, a Swiss road tunnel connecting Hergiswil with Alpnach as part of the A8 motorway
