= Arlberg Tunnel =

Arlberg Tunnel may refer to the following tunnels in Austria:

- Arlberg Railway Tunnel
- Arlberg Road Tunnel
