= European route E57 =

Road in trans-European E-road network

E57

Route information
- Length: 411 km (255 mi)

Major junctions
- North end: Sattledt, Austria
- South end: Ljubljana, Slovenia

Location
- Countries: Austria; Slovenia

Highway system
- International E-road network; A Class; B Class

European route E 57 is an intermediate E-road connecting the Austrian city of Sattledt with the Slovenian capital city of Ljubljana via Liezen, St. Michael, Graz and Maribor.

In Austria, it follows the A9 motorway, also called Pyhrnautobahn. In Slovenia it follows the A1 motorway.

The E 57 includes the second-longest tunnel in Austria, the Plabutschtunnel, 10.0 km (6.2 mi) long. It also includes the Gleinalm tunnel, 8.3 km (5.2 mi) long, and the Bosruck tunnel, 5.5 km (3.4 mi) long.

== Itinerary ==
The E 57 routes through two European countries:

=== Austria ===
Starting at the junction with the E56 from Nuremberg to the north-west and the E60 from Salzburg to the south.

Pyhrn Autobahn	Sattledt ( E56 E60) - Liezen - St. Michael - Graz - Straß in Steiermark – (Slovenia)

=== Slovenia ===
A1 motorway (Slovenia)	(Austria) – Šentilj v Slovenskih Goricah - Maribor - Celje - Ljubljana (Ljubljana Ring Road)
