= Innkreis Autobahn =

Road in Austria

Motorway A8
- Innkreis Autobahn A8

Route information
- Part of E57
- Length: 77 km (48 mi)

Major junctions
- From: A 1 / A 9 junction
- A 25 near Wels
- To: A 3 at German border

Location
- Country: Austria
- Regions: Upper Austria

Highway system
- Highways of Austria; Autobahns; Expressways; State Roads
← A 7	→ A 9

The Innkreis Autobahn (A8, Innkreis Motorway) is a motorway, or Autobahn, in Austria. It runs from the A1 and A9 junction to the border with Germany.

The last section of motorway was built in 2003.

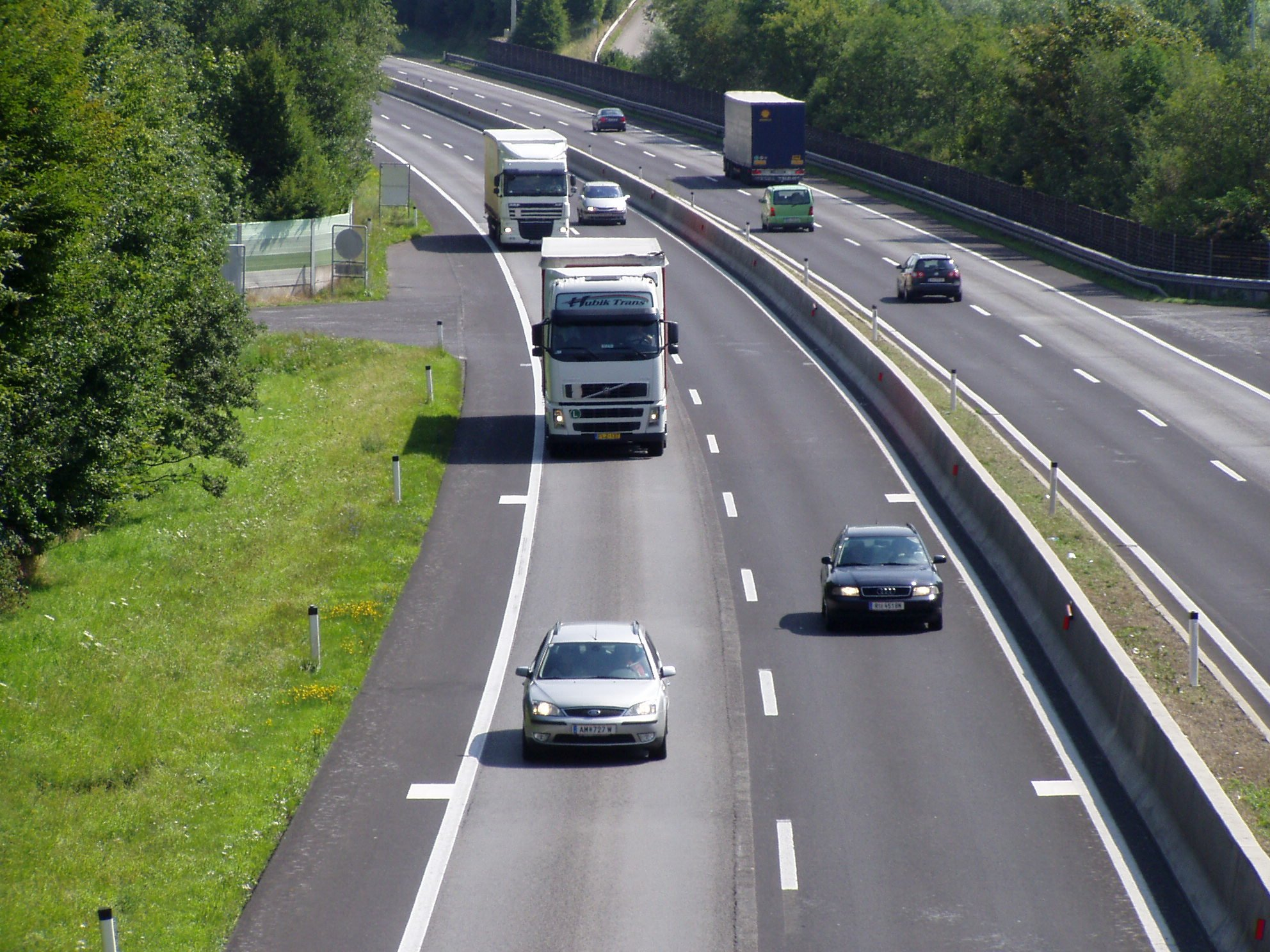
Autobahn in Pichl bei Wels
