= Pyhrn Autobahn =

Road in Austria

Motorway A9
- Pyhrn Autobahn A9

Route information
- Length: 230 km (140 mi)

Major junctions
- From: A1 and A8 junction
- S6 and S36 S35 A2 near Graz
- To: A1 border with Slovenia

Location
- Country: Austria
- Regions: Upper Austria, Styria
- Major cities: Graz

Highway system
- Highways of Austria; Autobahns; Expressways; State Roads
| ← A 8 | → A 10 |

The Pyhrn Autobahn (A9) (Pyhrn motorway) is an Autobahn (motorway) in Austria. It runs through the Alps by two two-lane tunnels, the 5,400-metre-long (17,700 ft) Bosrucktunnel and the 8,320-metre-long (27,300 ft) Gleinalmtunnel. The longest tunnel on the motorway is the 10-kilometre-long (6.2 mi) Plabutschtunnel under Graz and its outskirts. The last section of the highway was completed in 2004.

While in 2016 some sections still remain single carriageway, including some tunnels, work is progressing to make the Phyrn Autobahn fully dual carriageway. The second carriageway of the Bosruckstunnel was opened on 19 October 2015. The Tunnelkette Klaus (8 km) and the Gleinalmtunnel (8.3 km — the last sections with a single carriageway — were planned to receive a second carriageway in late 2018 and 2019, respectively.

The motorway south of the A2 interchange is a part of the Pan-European corridor Xa.
