= Karawanks Tunnel =

The Karawanks Tunnel may refer to two tunnels connecting Austria and Slovenia under the Karawanks (German: Karawanken, Slovene: Karavanke) mountain range:

- Karawanks Tunnel (motorway), a 7864-metre-long motorway tunnel, completed in 1991
- Karawanks Tunnel (railway), a 7976-metre-long railway tunnel, completed in 1906
