= Karawanks Tunnel (motorway) =

Motorway tunnel

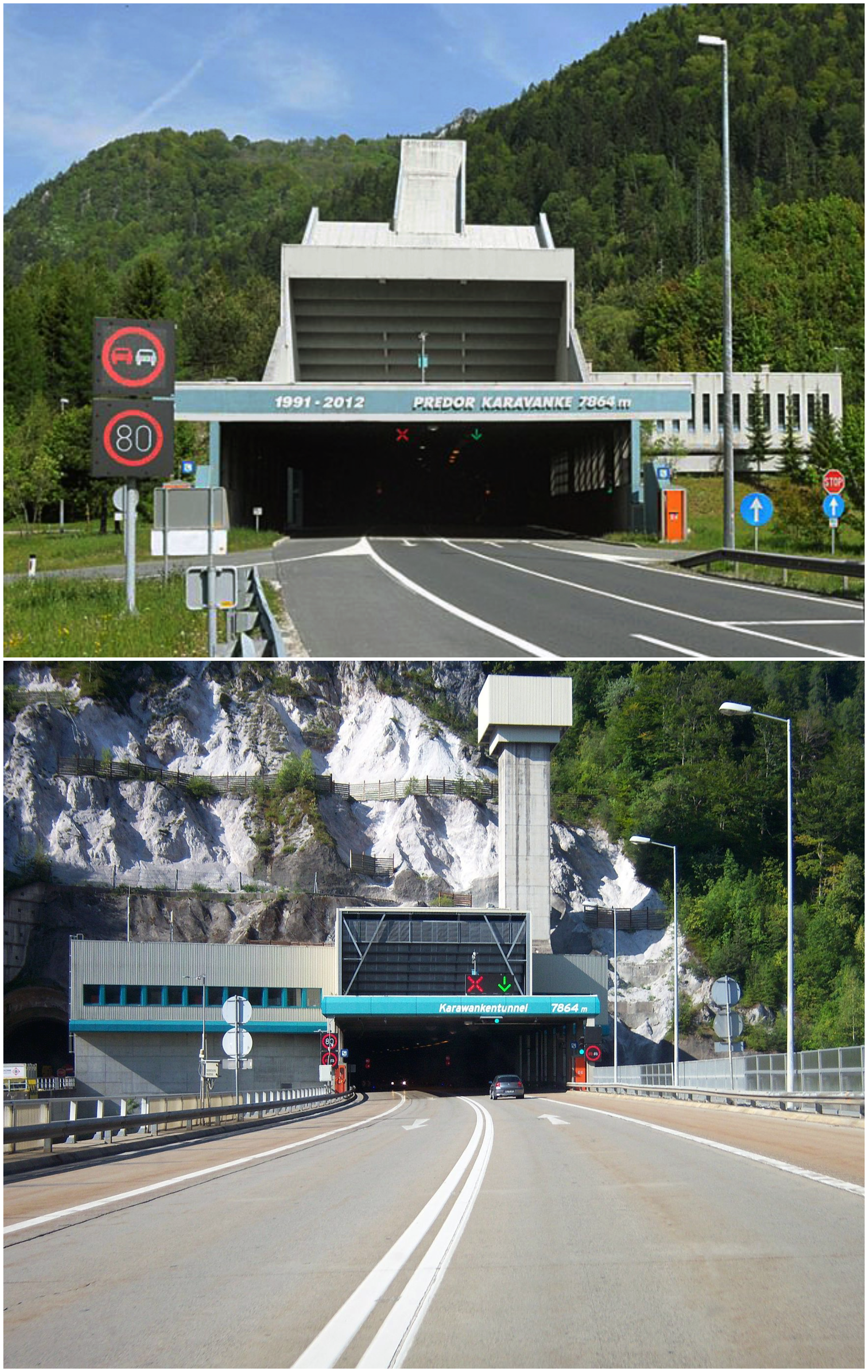
- South portal (top) Slovenia / North portal (bottom) Austria
- Interactive map of Karawanks Tunnel

Overview
- Location: Sankt Jakob im Rosental, Carinthia, Austria/ Hrušica, Jesenice, Slovenia
- Coordinates: 46°31′09″N 14°01′22″E
- Status: Second tube under construction
- Route: Karawanken Autobahn/ A2 motorway

Operation
- Work began: August 1986 / September 2018
- Opened: June 1991
- Closed: West-Tube: 2026 - 2029
- Operator: ASFiNAG / DARS
- Character: Single-tube (Second tube under construction)

Technical
- Length: 8,138 m (5.057 mi; 26,699 ft)
- No. of lanes: 2
- Operating speed: 80 km/h (50 mph)

The Karawanks Tunnel (German: Karawankentunnel, Slovene: Predor Karavanke or Karavanški predor) is a motorway tunnel crossing the Alpine Karawanks mountain range between Austria and Slovenia, with a total length of 7,864 m (4.886 mi; 25,801 ft), 8,019 m (4.983 mi; 26,309 ft) enclosure between the portals. Its construction began in 1986 and it opened on 1 June 1991. It connects the Austrian Karawanken Autobahn (A11) from Villach with the A2 motorway leading to Kranj and Ljubljana in Slovenia, decongesting the historic Loibl/Ljubelj and Wurzen/Korensko sedlo mountain passes.

Location of the Karawanks motorway tunnel

== History ==
In the late 1970s it was planned by the Austrian Ministry of Traffic as a two-tube tunnel, (one two-lane tube for each direction), but lower than expected levels of traffic have meant that it has remained a single tube, single lane, two-way tunnel. The tunnel was built between 1986 and 1991 by the Tauern Autobahn stock company, represented by the Austrian state of Carinthia. At its opening it was one of the best equipped tunnels with safety and surveillance systems: emergency phones, fire detectors, video surveillance, traffic signalling, radio and phone connections, air circulation monitoring and carbon monoxide sensors.

Less than a month after its opening, in late June 1991, the Slovene terminus of the tunnel and its border post at Jesenice were briefly seized by an armoured detachment of the Yugoslav People's Army during the Ten-Day War. The site witnessed brief but intense fighting, which included the ferrying of reinforcements to the Yugoslav troops by helicopter and culminated in an ineffectual airstrike by the Yugoslav Air Force. The border checkpoint building was heavily damaged in the crossfire.

== Construction of the second tube 2018–2026 ==
Since Slovenia joined the Schengen Area in 2007, border controls have been abolished. Due to increasing traffic volume especially after the completion of the second tube of the Tauern Road Tunnel in June 2011, congestion crops up, especially on weekends in the summer season, and has led to the resumption of plans to build a second tube. The contract for the second twin tunnel was signed in September 2015.

After the construction of a 350-metre-long (1,150 ft) bridge and the extension of the Autobahn, finished on the Austrian side by the end of 2017, the construction of the new tube itself successfully started on 18 September 2018 from the Austrian side.

Construction in Slovenia started a year and a half later in the first week of March 2020 after an award dispute which was resolved in the end of 2019.

=== Award dispute in Slovenia ===
The construction in Slovenia was delayed but finally started in the beginning of March 2020 since the national review commission of Slovenia, DKOM, canceled the award of contract made with the Turkish contractor Cengiz Insaat which was initially chosen to build the Slovenian side of the tunnel at the end of November 2018. The reason for this were improper documents submitted for the tender offer to the Slovenian motorway operator DARS in August 2018. Additionally DARS decided to reject all offers in general in the midst of February 2019 since all of them had errors according to the motorway company. Six bidders would have been invited to take part in a negotiated procedure with DARS including Cengiz Insaat. The period for objection however ended two weeks later when DARS received two formal objections from the Slovenian construction companies Kolektor CPG and Gorenjska gradbena družba. The expert commission from DARS rejected the objections two weeks later handing the decision over to DKOM again.

On 15 May 2019 DKOM published its decision to reject the objections too following the resignation in April of DKOM's chairman Borut Smrdel.

Since then DARS was conducting a negotiated procedure with six applicants and their partners.

The negotiated procedure was once again interrupted from 26 June because Gorenjska gradbena družba and Kolektor CPG lodged an appeal for the third time in a row against the participation of Cengiz İnşaat accusing the company of not being suitable as a contractor.

In the mid of July 2019 DKOM decided to reject the appeal from Gorenjska gradbena družba and Kolektor CPG. Right after the publication of the decision DARS published the official offers from the finished negotiated procedure. After two months of evaluation DARS decided to give three tenderers the chance to make a new offer.

In October 2019 Gorenjska gradbena družba and Kolektor CPG once again lodged an appeal for the fourth time against the new selection of tenderers. DARS rejected it two weeks later as well as DKOM did in November.

==== Cengiz İnşaat receives the final contract ====
On 3 December 2019 DARS finally gave a new contract to Cengiz İnşaat worth 98.5 million euros (excl. VAT) after short negotiations with three tenderers.

The appeal period ended without further objections in mid-December 2019.

The winner's chief negotiator, Mehmet Cengiz, subsequently told the media that the contract will be signed in late December. The CEO of Cengiz İnşaat, Utku Gök, said on Monday before the final negotiations that the construction in Slovenia would still be finished in time with his company.

Construction in Slovenia finally started in the first week of March 2020. The official contract period for Slovenia started on 2 March 2020. In the meanwhile Austrians have dug 2,400 meters into the mountain by the end of March 2020.

The second tube is set to be finished in June 2025. After that, the old tube will undergo intense renovation for two years. Both tubes will be open in 2029. The second tube opened on March 18, 2026.

== Tolls ==
Driving on Austrian as well as on Slovenian motorways requires a toll sticker. However, driving through the tunnel doesn't require any. Instead, a special toll (2026 rate) of 9.00 euros (20% VAT included) is imposed on drivers of vehicles up to 3.5 tons for using the tunnel. The toll is collected for the section from the closest on-ramp to the tunnel on the Austrian side to the Austrian/Slovenian border in the middle of the tunnel. The Slovenian vignette is not required as the tunnel is not part of motorway sections with the mandatory use of vignettes. The toll from the Slovenian side is also €9.00.

Vehicles over 3.5t (trucks, buses, motorhomes) pay toll on Austrian highways based on number of kilometres travelled. For the 10 kilometres (6.2 mi) section that includes the tunnel a special rate equivalent to 8.6 times the normal one is applied, coming to 16.27-46.36 € incl. VAT (13.56-38.63 € + 20% VAT) depending on number of axles and engine emission standard. Trucks entering from the Slovenian side pay toll no matter their EURO emission class.

== See also ==
- List of tunnels in Austria
- List of tunnels in the Alps
