= Lopper I Rail Tunnel =

Tunnel in central Switzerland

- Interactive map of Lopper I Rail Tunnel

Overview
- Line: Brünig
- Location: Nidwalden/Obwalden, Switzerland
- Coordinates: 46.975045°N 8.309695°E
- Status: Active

Operation
- Owner: Zentralbahn
- Operator: Zentralbahn
- Traffic: Rail
- Character: Passenger and freight

Technical
- Length: 1,186 metres (3,891 ft)
- No. of tracks: 1
- Track gauge: 1,000 mm (3 ft 3 3/8 in)
- Electrified: Overhead catenary 11 kV AC 16 2/3 Hz

The Lopper I Rail Tunnel is a railway tunnel in central Switzerland. The tunnel connects Hergiswil in the canton of Nidwalden with Alpnach in the canton of Obwalden. It forms part of the Zentralbahn Brünig line, which links Lucerne with Interlaken and the Bernese Oberland, between Hergiswil station and Alpnachstad station. It is 1,186 metres (3,891 ft) in length, and carries metre gauge (1,000 mm or 3 ft 3 3/8 in) track electrified at 11 kV AC 16 2/3 Hz using overhead catenary. The tunnel runs under the Lopper, a shoulder of Mount Pilatus which extends into Lake Lucerne.

The Lopper I Tunnel is paralleled by the Lopper road tunnel, carrying the A8 motorway. The nearby Lopper II Tunnel is a rail tunnel on the Zentralbahn Luzern–Stans–Engelberg line, the two rail lines joining at Hergiswil station.
