= Girsberg Tunnel =

Road tunnel in Switzerland

Coordinates: 47°38′33″N 9°9′8″E

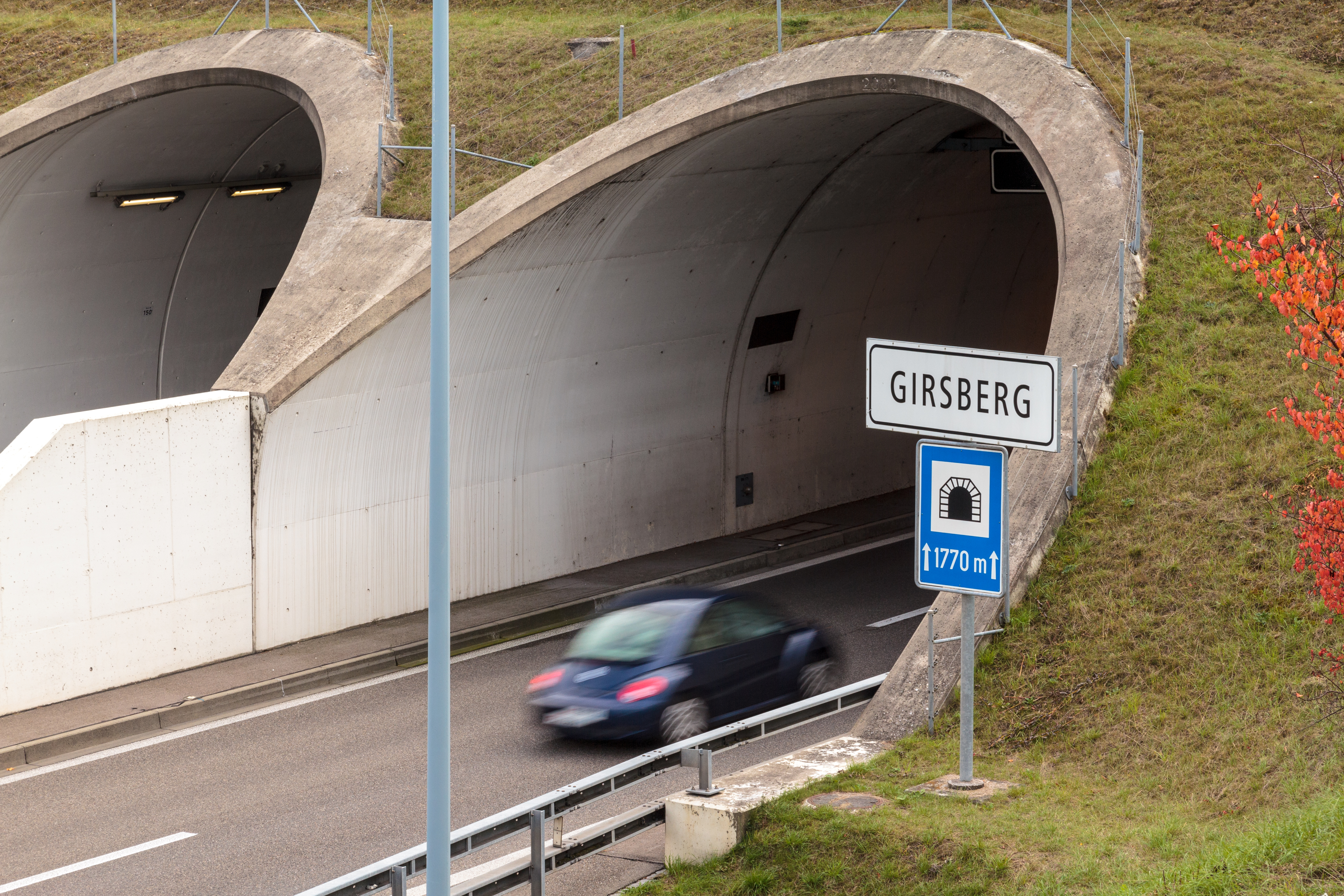
North portal (2017)

The Girsberg Tunnel is a motorway tunnel in Switzerland. The tunnel lies in the northeastern part of the canton of Thurgau, and forms part of the A7 motorway from Winterthur to Kreuzlingen and the border to Germany. The tunnel was completed in 2002, and is 1,770 metres (5,810 ft) in length.

The tunnel essentially winds its way down a hill in a clockwise direction (heading into Kreuzlingen). Despite all this winding, there is no actual difficulty in driving through the tunnel. The eastern end of the tunnel is less than half a kilometre away from the terminus of the toll portion of the A7 motorway, which takes the form of a rarely seen motorway roundabout.

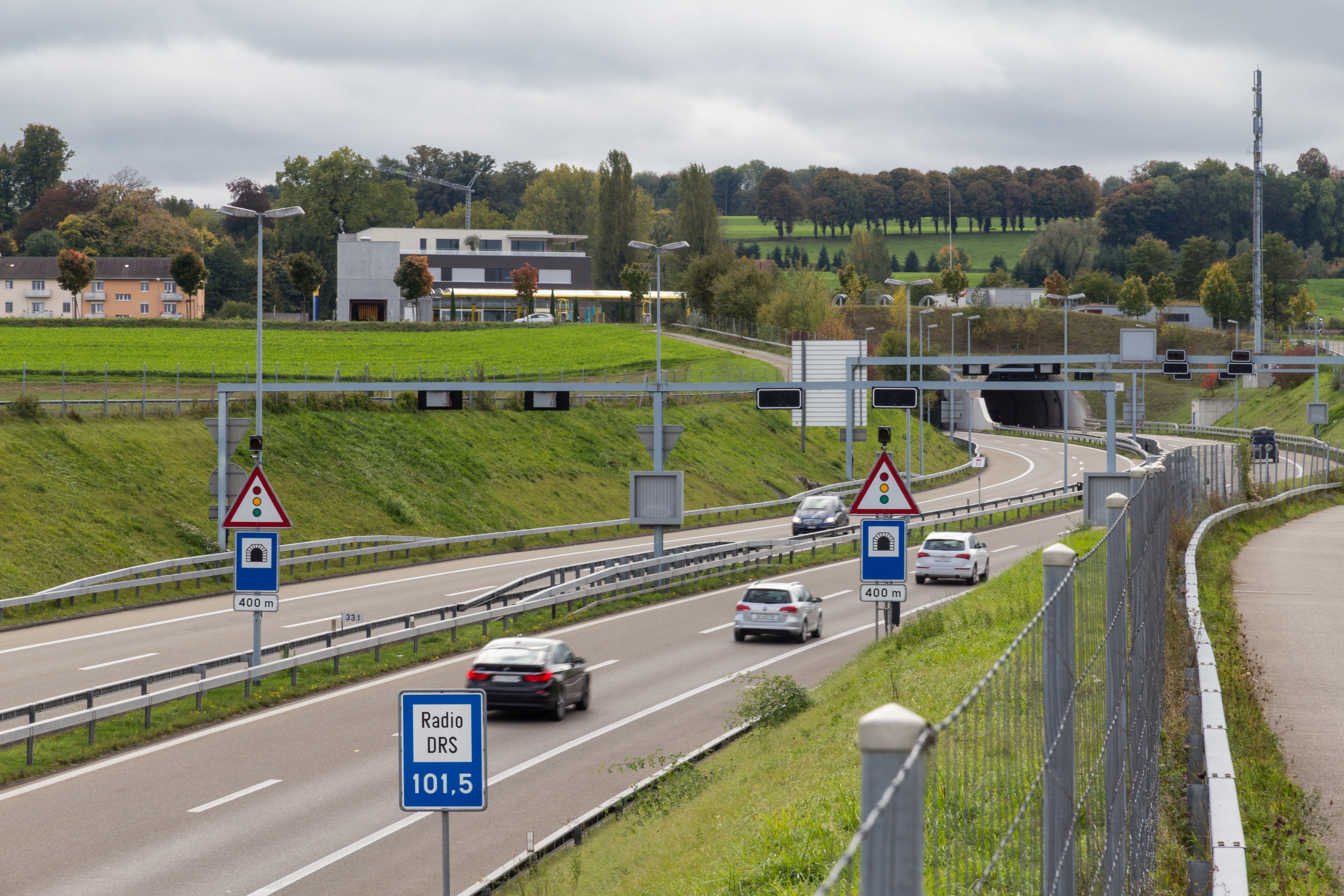
A7 leading to north portal (2017)
