= Giswil Tunnel =

Road tunnel in Switzerland

Coordinates: 46°50′2″N 8°11′34″E

The Giswil Tunnel is a tunnel in central Switzerland. The tunnel bypasses the town of Giswil in the canton of Obwalden, and forms part of the A8 motorway. The tunnel was completed in 2004, and is 2,066 metres (6,778 ft) long.
