= Sachseln Tunnel =

Road tunnel in Switzerland

Coordinates: 46°51′34″N 8°14′3″E

The Sachseln Tunnel is a tunnel in the Swiss canton of Obwalden. It runs to the south-east of the Lake of Sarnen (Sarner See) between Giswil and Sarnen, bypassing the old road along the lake side, and forms part of the A8 motorway. The tunnel was completed in 1997 and is 5,231 metres (17,162 ft) long.

The speed limit through the tunnel is 80 kilometres per hour (50 mph).

As the tunnel does not meet modern safety standards, work is being undertaken to uprate it, with the construction of a parallel safety tunnel with cross connections at least every 300 metres (980 ft), and the renewal of ventilation and other safety equipment. The work is expected to be completed by 2019.
