= Cholfirst Tunnel =

Road tunnel in Switzerland

Coordinates: 47.688°N 8.632°E

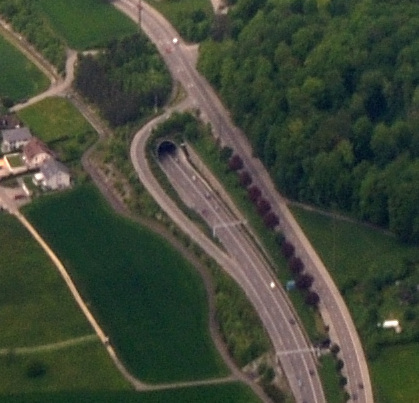
South portal with A4 exit Flurlingen, aerial view (2010)

The Cholfirst Tunnel is a tunnel in Switzerland. The tunnel lies in the northern canton of Zuerich, and forms part of the Autostrasse A4. It was completed in 1996, and is 1,260 metres (4,130 ft) long.

The tunnel has three lanes (two heading for Zürich, and one heading for Schaffhausen). There is no central reservation.

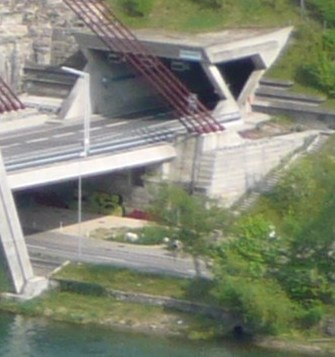
North portal (2008)
