= Lopper Road Tunnel =

Road tunnel in Switzerland

Coordinates: 46.975°N 8.305°E

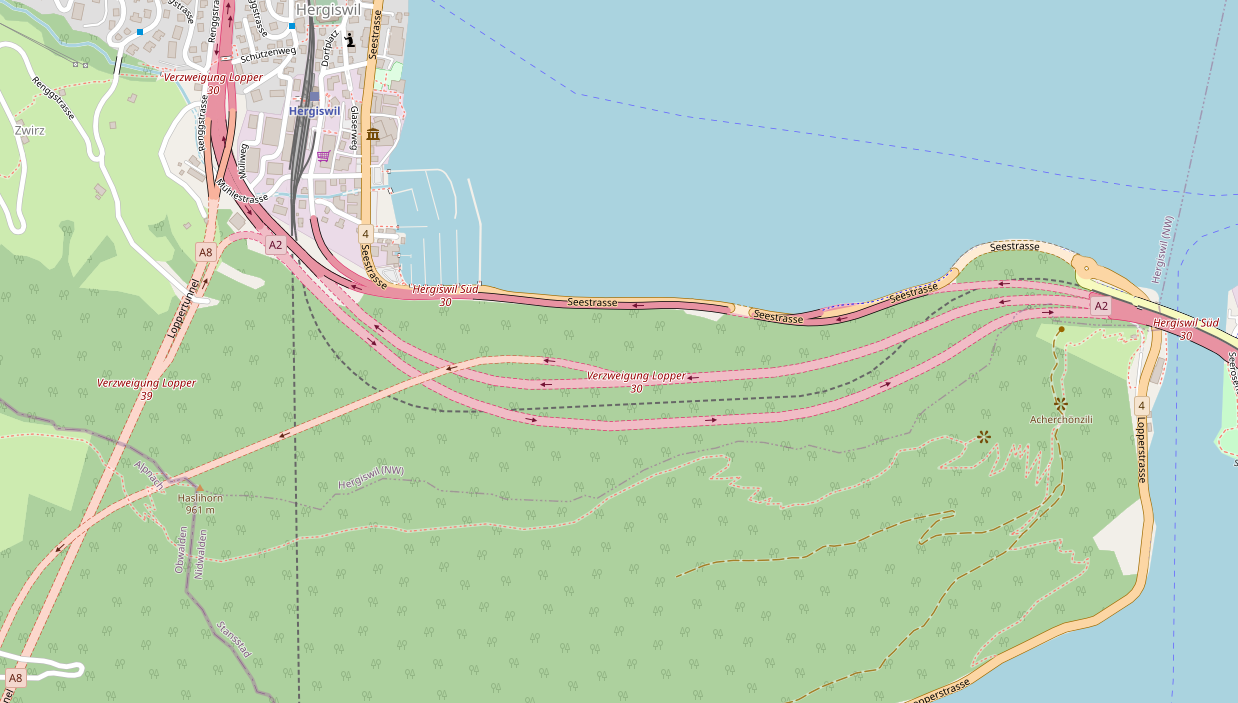
Lopper hill with Lopper Road Tunnel (left), Lopper interchange of A2 (north to east) and A8 (south) and Kirchenwald Tunnel (center)

The Lopper Road Tunnel is a tunnel in central Switzerland. The tunnel connects Hergiswil in the canton of Nidwalden with Alpnach in the canton of Obwalden, and forms part of the A8 motorway. The tunnel was opened in 1984, and is 1,590 metres (5,220 ft) long. The tunnel has two lanes (one in each direction), and there is no central reservation. The tunnel runs under the Lopper, a shoulder of Mount Pilatus which extends into Lake Lucerne.

The northern portal of the Lopper Tunnel is near to that of the Kirchenwald Tunnel on the A2 motorway, and most of the junction between the two motorways lies to the north of their respective portals. However the link for westbound traffic from the A2 to the A8 utilises a 350 metres (1,150 ft) long single-lane link tunnel within the mountain between the two main motorway tunnels.

The Lopper I railway tunnel, on the Zentralbahn Brünig line, parallels the Lopper road tunnel. The Lopper II railway tunnel, on the Zentralbahn Luzern–Stans–Engelberg line, parallels the Kirchenwald road tunnel.
