= Col de Tende Road Tunnel =

Road tunnel between Italy and France

Colle di Tenda road tunnel
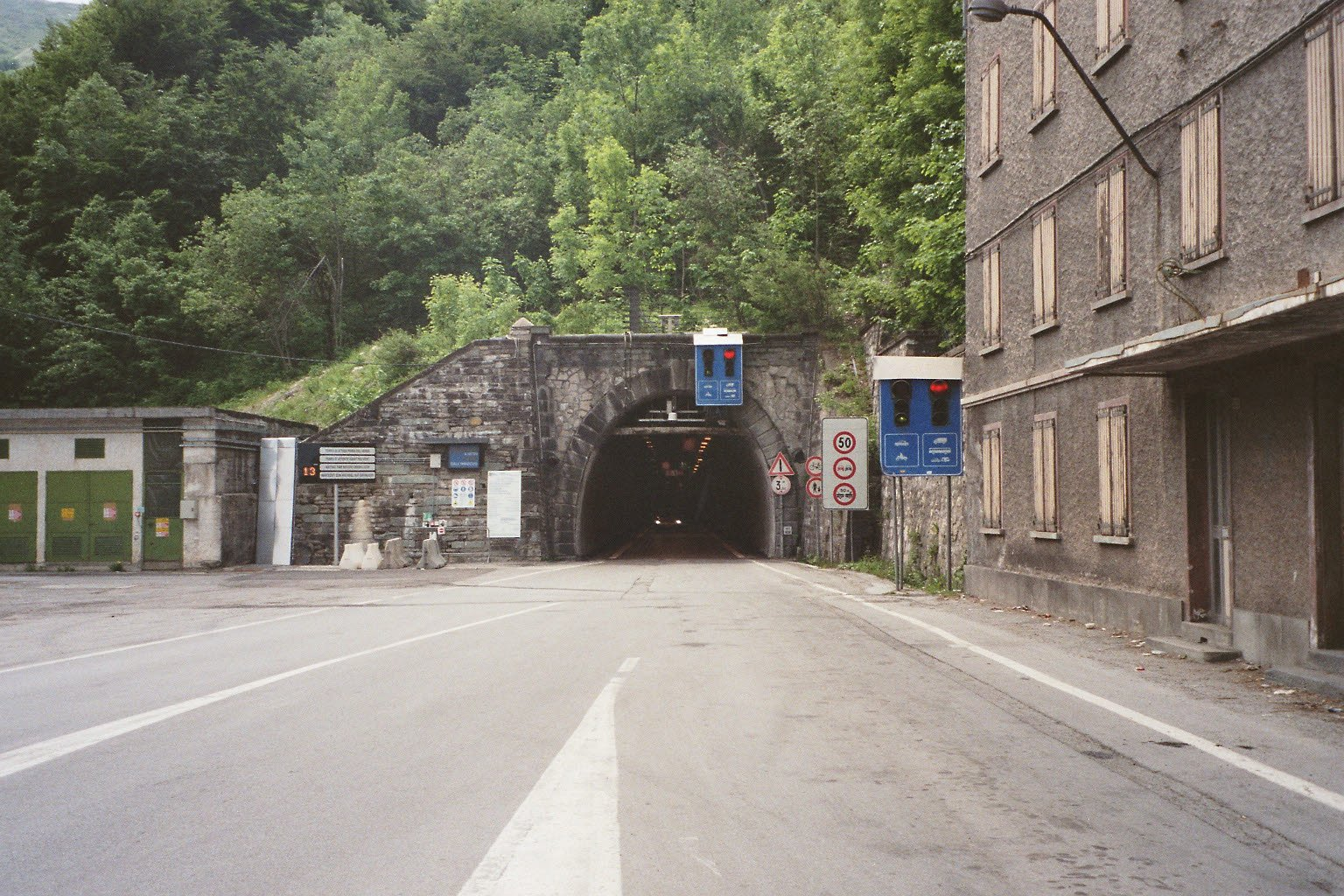
- Portal on Italian side
- Interactive map of Colle di Tenda road tunnel

Overview
- Official name: Traforo stradale del Colle di Tenda (in Italian) Tunnel routier du col de Tende (in French)
- Location: Colle di Tenda, Italy/France
- Coordinates: 44°9′12″N 7°34′16″E
- Crosses: Colle di Tenda
- Start: France
- End: Italy

Operation
- Work began: 1873
- Opened: 1882
- Closed: 2020
- Reopened: Partially reopened in 2025

Technical
- Design engineer: Giovanni Delfino
- Length: 3,182 m (10,440 ft)
- No. of lanes: 1 with alternating direction of traffic
- Max elevation: 1321 m (French side)
- Min elevation: 1280 m (Italian side)

Location of the Colle di Tenda Road Tunnel

The Colle di Tenda road tunnel is a tunnel located between Italy and France under the Colle di Tenda. It links Limone Piemonte, Piedmont, Italy with Tende, Alpes-Maritimes, France. It can be reached via the Strada Statale 20 on the Italian side and the RD 6204 on the French side. These two roads form the European route E74. The tunnel provides a quick and direct connection between the Italian cities of Cuneo and its homonymous province, and the city of Ventimiglia located in the Province of Imperia in Liguria, while also connecting the French towns of the Maritime Alps. Designed by engineer Giovanni Delfino, it was, at the time of its opening in 1882, the longest road tunnel ever built, with a length of 3,182 meters.

At the time of its inauguration, it was entirely within the Kingdom of Italy. Following the Paris Peace Treaties of 1947, it was divided between Italy and France.

== Description ==
Alongside the coastal border at Ventimiglia, the Fréjus Road Tunnel and Mont Blanc Tunnel (both motorway crossings), the Colle di Tenda is one of the key non-motorway connections between Italy and France. By some accounts, especially during its opening period, and still to some extent, it was preferred to the other crossings since it is traversable free of charge, it has a short length, and is open year-round due to the relatively low elevation of its portals, which means it doesn't have to close in winter due to adverse weather conditions.

== Doubling of the Tenda tunnel ==
Over time, considering traffic volumes and new safety standards, it was decided to upgrade and improve the tunnel. The project included a new tunnel to carry the traffic towards France with a carriageway of 6.50 meters (a 3.50-meter traffic lane, a 2.70-meter emergency lane, and a 0.30-meter shoulder), while the old tunnel would be widened and used to carry traffic towards Italy. Some emergency passages would have been made between the two tunnels. To avoid interrupting traffic, the works—initiated in 2012 with preliminary geological surveys—would have been carried out in phases.

In May 2017, the Cuneo Public Prosecutor's Office seized the construction site to allow technical inspections as part of an investigation into public supply fraud and aggravated theft. Seventeen people were investigated, including an Anas official and managers from the Fincosit company, which had won the Anas contract, 42% of which was funded by France. Wiretaps revealed issues with the construction of an eleven-meter-tall retaining wall—the largest containment work of the entire project—designed to support the road exiting the new tunnel and protect it from landslides. Additionally, arch support frames for the tunnel were sold to other companies instead of being installed. That same month, the Nice prosecutor also requested the seizure of the new tunnel on the French side.

On April 7, 2018, Anas ended the contract for the new tunnel with Fincosit due to contractual breaches not linked to the prosecutor’s investigation. Among the reasons cited was the failure to dispose of anhydrite.

On May 26, 2020, the final assignment of the works was formalized to the contractor Consorzio Stabile Edilmaco.

Although the works did not affect the old tunnel, which remained in use during the ordeal, it was closed on October 2, 2020 due to landslides on both the French and Italian sides caused by severe weather (Storm Alex). On the French side, the access viaduct to the tunnel collapsed, making it impossible to reach the tunnel.

Due to the landslides, the entire project was revised to include a new viaduct and a new common entrance to both tubes on the French side. The total cost of the project will be €255 million, and has already been fully funded.

=== Work Progress ===
As reported on the official website, on November 3, 2021, excavation work resumed on the new Tenda tunnel. Operations restarted on the Italian side of the tunnel about 1,270 meters from the portal. On April 22, 2022, blasting operations also resumed on the French side, about 493 meters from the entrance.

As of September 23, 2022, fewer than 850 meters of tunnel remained to be excavated (110 meters on the Italian side and 740 meters on the French side), with alternating one-way traffic expected to resume by October 2023. The entire dual-tube tunnel, with the new French-side portal and upgraded existing tunnel, is expected to be completed by July 2025.

On 31 July 2023, the last diaphragm of the new tunnel was demolished; however, the concrete lining and the passages with the old tunnel remained to be completed.

The official inauguration of the new tunnel took place on 27 June 2025.

From 28 June 2025, the tunnel is again transitable with alternating one-way traffic during the following hours: from 06:00 to 21:00 on weekends, and from 06:00 to 09:00, from 12:30 to 14:30, and from 18:00 to 22:00 on weekdays.

The completion of modernization works is scheduled for spring 2026, but only by the end of 2028 will both tunnels be available for use.

== See also ==
- Colle di Tenda
