= Bubenholz Tunnel =

Road tunnel in Switzerland

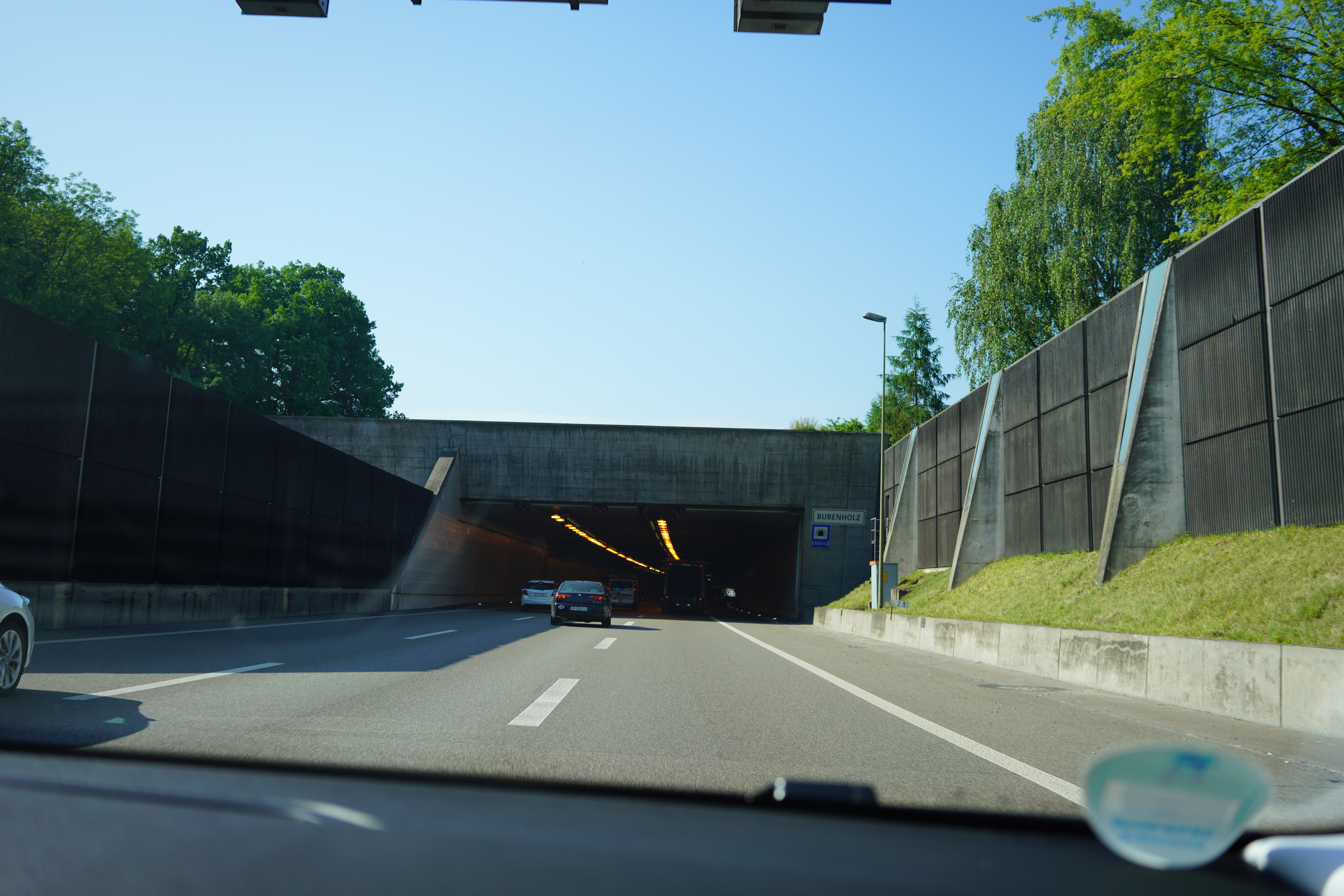
- North portal southbound (2018)
- Interactive map of Bubenholz Tunnel

Overview
- Location: Zurich, Switzerland
- Coordinates: 47°25′59″N 8°34′16″E
- Status: Active
- Route: A51 motorway

Operation
- Character: road

Technical
- Length: 550 metres (1,800 ft)

The Bubenholz Tunnel is a motorway tunnel in the Swiss canton of Zurich. It forms part of the A51 motorway, which links the A1 motorway with Zurich Airport. The tunnel is 550 metres (1,800 ft) long.

The tunnel replaced several overpasses which existed until the early 2000s, with the intention of cutting noise in the nearby towns of Glattbrugg and Opfikon.
