= Zermatt–Sunnegga Funicular =

Underground funicular at Zermatt, Switzerland

Coordinates: 46.01982°N 7.76109°E

Standseilbahn Zermatt–Sunnegga
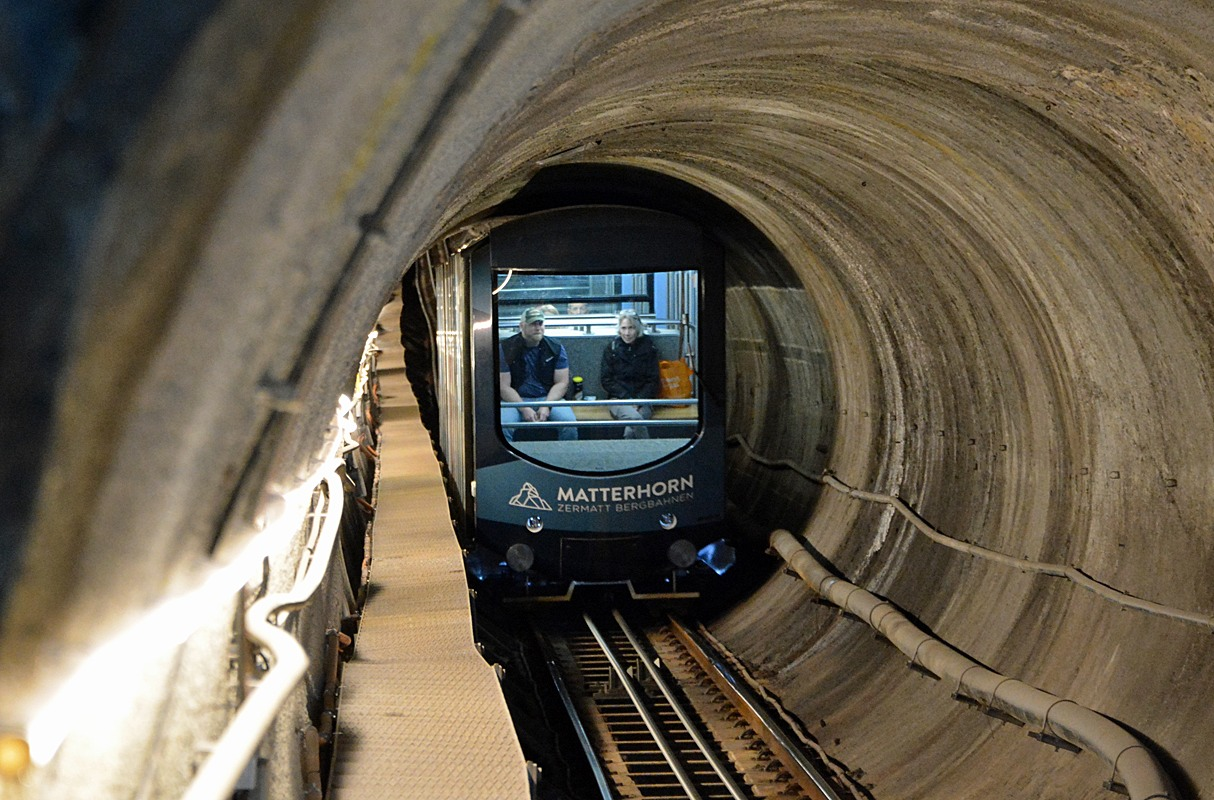
- funicular in 2016

Overview
- Other name(s): Sunnegga-Express
- Status: In operation
- Owner: Zermatt Bergbahnen AG (since 2002); Standseilbahn Zermatt-Sunnegga AG (1980-2001)
- Locale: Zermatt, Switzerland
- Termini: "Zermatt (Talstation Sunnegga)"; "Sunnegga"
- Stations: 2

Service
- Type: funicular railway; underground railway
- Operator(s): Zermatt Bergbahnen AG
- Rolling stock: 2 for 200 passengers each

History
- Opened: 28 December 1980 (44 years ago)
- Enhancements: 2013

Technical
- Track length: 1,545 metres (5,069 ft)
- Track gauge: 1,000 mm (3 ft 3 3/8 in)
- Electrification: Since opening
- Operating speed: 12 metres per second (39.4 ft/s)
- Highest elevation: 2,293 m (7,523 ft)
- Maximum incline: 63%

The Zermatt–Sunnegga Funicular, also known as the Standseilbahn Zermatt–Sunnegga, or short SunneggaExpress, is an underground funicular railway in the canton of Valais, Switzerland. It links a lower station in the resort village of Zermatt, with an upper station at 2293 m Sunnegga, 698 m above, and forms the first link in the route to the Sunnegga Paradise ski area. The funicular was heavily modernized by Doppelmayr in 2013.

The line has the following properties:

Feature	Value
Number of cars	2
Number of stops	2
Configuration	Single track with passing loop
Track length	1,545 metres (5,069 ft)
Rise	698 metres (2,290 ft)
Average gradient	48.7%
Maximum gradient	63.3%
Track gauge	1,000 mm (3 ft 3 3/8 in)
Capacity	200 passengers per car
Maximum speed	12 metres per second (39.4 ft/s)
Travel time	3 minutes

The funicular is operated by Zermatt Bergbahnen AG since 2002, after it absorded Standseilbahn Zermatt-Sunnegga AG that built it.

== See also ==
- List of funicular railways
- List of funiculars in Switzerland
