= A8 motorway (Switzerland) =

Autobahn in central Switzerland

Coordinates: 46.915604°N 8.267041°E

A8

- Location of the A8 in Switzerland

Route information
- Length: 94 km (58 mi)

Location
- Country: Switzerland

Highway system
- Transport in Switzerland; Motorways

The A8 motorway, an Autobahn in central Switzerland, is a divided highway connecting the Bernese Oberland and the Innerschweiz. It is part of the National Road N8. For the Canton of Obwalden, it is the lifeline that has allowed the settling of industrial firms in this historically predominantly agricultural region. Via the A8, speedy connections to the major economic centers in the Swiss Plateau Mittelland and the north–south transit axis A2 are now possible. For tourists, A8 opens up in the opposite direction: the large ski resorts in the Bernese Oberland and the tourism regions around the Brünig Pass and Interlaken.

== Route ==
The A8 provides a scenic route to the Lake Thun to Interlaken, passing the former Mystery Park and continues along the southern shore of Lake Brienz for Brienz BE, where it winds its way on up to the Brünig Pass.

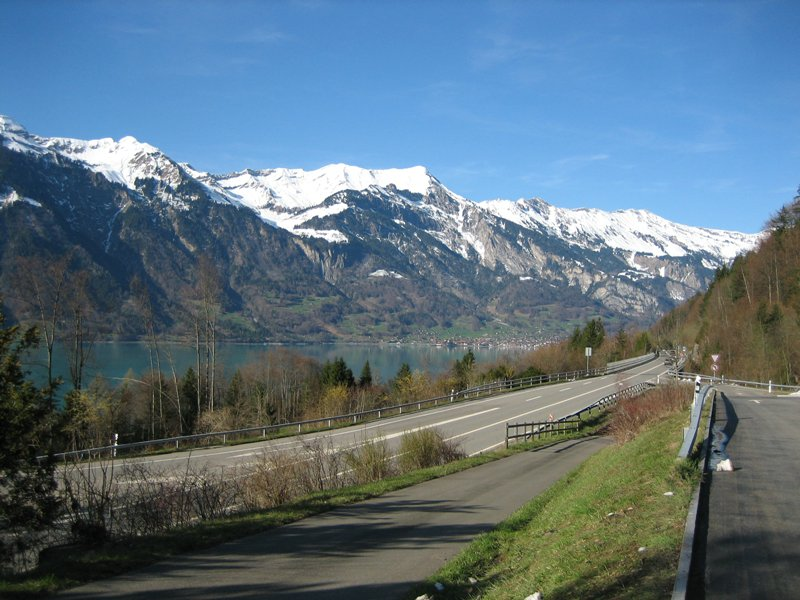
A8 with a view to Brienz, Lake Brienz and the side of Brienz Rothorn.

With many more corners, the north side of the pass extends down to Lungern, where a 3.5-kilometre-long (2.2 mi) bypass tunnel is currently under construction (scheduled completion 2012). It continues parallel to the Lake Lungern shoreline until the hamlet of Kaiserstuhl OW and then with a series of steep switchbacks drops down to Giswil. A 2.1-kilometre-long (1.3 mi) road tunnel, opened in Oct 2004, bypasses the village, considerably reducing the through-traffic and sparing travellers the long wait at grade level crossing of the Bruenigbahn in the village center. Next, just a few hundred meters after the Giswil tunnel comes the Zollhouse tunnel, a 417-m Cut-and-cover long stretch that straightens out a narrow section of road next to the Sarnen Lake (due to open in mid-2010). A few hundred meters further comes the portal to the next bypass tunnel, that of Sachseln, which, with its just over 5 kilometres (3.1 mi) length, is one of the longer single bore road tunnels in Switzerland. After the tunnel is Sarnen, where the road is expanded to a 4 lane divided highway. Built over a former military airstrip (along with bridge), it serves as a straight highway to Alpnach, while ahead Mount Pilatus rises. Finally, the road follows the edge of the Alpnachersee lake along the Lopper Tunnel portal. Via an elaborate series of sub-tunnels inside the mountain, this connects in both north and south directions with the A2 enabling travel north to Luzern and Germany beyond as well as south towards the Gotthard and Italy. The ability to turn off the A2 onto the A8 in the northbound direction was only added with the construction of the new Kirchenwald tunnel and a 2-kilometre-long (1.2 mi) single lane connecting tunnel (which turns off the A2 inside the mountain, loops over the top of the main A2 tunnel before emerging parallel to the A8 Lopper portal.

== Transportation ==
The A8 is the only east–west connection in the region that is open year-round, and hence it has heavy traffic. Except in the Interlaken area and Sarnen, where it is four lanes, it is mostly an Autostrasse road (wider, with hard shoulders and designed for 100 km/h speeds); however the Brünig Pass section is just a normal pass road (80km/h speed limit although the practical limit is considerably less in sections). In Obwalden, a major project to improve the A8 has been underway since 1990 when the construction of the 5.2 km long Sachseln Tunnel began. Currently the last two stages of the project are under construction and both are planned to be completed in 2029. A Bruenigpass tunnel has been under consideration for decades but is not currently part of the official long term planning due in part to concerns about increasing the quantity of heavy goods traffic from Bern along the route.

== Military use ==
The A8 motorway (Switzerland) near Alpnach Air Base was built so that it could be used as a takeoff and landing runway and was associated with temporary taxiways with the Aircraft cavern. However, only take-off were made for safety reasons, the landings were made on the normal runway with F-5 "Tiger".

== Major engineering works ==
The following major construction projects have been completed as part of the A8 upgrade in Obwalden:

- Umfahrungstunnel Sachseln, a bypass tunnel completed in 1997
- Umfahrungstunnel Giswil, a bypass tunnel completed in 2004
- Renovation of the Loppertunnel in 2005/06
- The Kirchenwaldtunnel linking the A2 and A8 completed in 2008
- Umfahrungstunnel Zollhouse, a bypass tunnel completed in 2010
- Umfahrungstunnel Lungern, a bypass tunnel completed in 2012

The following major construction projects are underway:

- Tunnel Kaiserstuhl, a bypass tunnel which started construction in 2019 and is planned to open in mid-2029
- Creation of a 'Full Junction' (entry and exit ramps in both directions) at Alpnach Süd which is planned to open early 2029

The following are under consideration:

- Bruenigpass tunnel (not currently an official project)

The 13.8 km stretch of the A8 between Interlaken-Ost and Brienz has been renovated between 2013, when the first preparatory work began, and 2025. The work included the following improvements:

Open road

- Installation of a noise-reducing surface
- Restoration of the drainage system
- Expanding of the shoulder
- Renovation of the engineering structures

Tunnels

- Restoration of the ventilation (Completely new ventilation system in the Giessbach tunnel)
- New shoulders for the drainage system
- New surface
- Reflective coating of the walls
- Strengthening of the suspended ceiling (Giessbach tunnel)

== Junction list ==
Junctions

A6
(18)	Junction Lattigen A6
(19)	Spiez
	Motorway end
Autostrasse A8
	Leimeren/Hondrich (250 m)
(20)	Faulensee
Autostrasse A8
Hauptstrasse N8
Autostrasse A8
(21)	Leissigen (West)
	Umfahrung Leissigen (2200 m)
(21)	Leissigen (Ost)
Autostrasse A8
Hauptstrasse N8
Autostrasse A8
(22)	Därligen (West)
	Bypass-tunnel Därligen
(22)	Därligen (Ost)
Autostrasse A8
Hauptstrasse N8
	Motorway end
(24)	Unterseen / Interlaken West
	Rugen (780 m)
(25)	Wilderswil
(26)	Interlaken
	Motorway end
Autostrasse A8
	Lutschinen (545 m)
(27)	Bönigen
	Sengg (823 m)
(28)	Iseltwald
	Chüebalm (1339 m)
	Giessbach (3340 m)
(29)	Brienz
(30)	Unterbach
Autostrasse A8
Hauptstrasse N8 (Brünigpassstrasse)
	Soliwald/Brienzwiler (555 m)
(31)	Brienzwiler - planned
	Brünig Tunnel (3700 m?) - planned
Hauptstrasse N8 (Brünigpassstrasse)
Autostrasse A8
(32)	Lungern (Süd)
	Bypass-tunnel Lungern (3570 m)
(32)	Lungern (Nord)
Autostrasse A8
Hauptstrasse N8 (Brünigstrasse)
	Umfahrung Kaiserstuhl OW (ca. 1000 m) - under construction
Hauptstrasse N8 (Brünigstrasse)
Autostrasse A8
(33)	Giswil Süd
	Giswil Tunnel (2066 m)
(33)	Giswil Nord
Autostrasse A8
Hauptstrasse N8
	Zollhaus (417 m)
Hauptstrasse N8
Autostrasse A8
(34)	Sachseln Süd / Ewil - No exit for public traffic
	Sachseln Tunnel (5213 m)
Autostrasse A8
	Motorway end
(35)	Sarnen Süd / Sachseln
(36)	Sarnen Nord
	Motorway end
Autostrasse A8
(37)	Alpnach
(38)	Hergiswil
	Lopper Tunnel (1560 m)
Autostrasse A8
	Motorway end
(39)	Junction Lopper A2
A2
