= Felbertauern Tunnel =

Road tunnel in Austria

Felbertauern
- Interactive map of Felbertauern

Overview
- Line: B 108 (Austria)
- Location: Austria (Raneburg, Mittersill)
- Coordinates: 47.16048697°N 12.535954°E (North portal); 47.11815°N 12.504369°E (South portal)
- Status: Active since 25 June 1967
- Crosses: Alps under the Tauernkogel pass

Operation
- Work began: 1962
- Opened: 25 June 1967

Technical
- Length: 5,282 m (17,329 ft)

The Felbertauern Tunnel (German, Felbertauern) is a 5.3 km long tunnel located in the Austrian Alps. It connects the East Tyrol region in the state of Tyrol with the Pinzgau region in the state of Salzburg.

Construction began in 1962, and the tunnel was opened in 1967. Unlike most other tunnels in Austria, the Felbertauern Tunnel consists of one single tube. Approximately 4,000 vehicles traverse the tunnel per day, of which about 7% are trucks. Bicycles are not allowed in the tunnel, but a bicycle transport service is available.

The total length of the Felbertauern Tunnel is 5,313 meters (5.3 km), making it one of the eleven longest tunnels in Austria. Its highest point is situated at an altitude of 1,650 meters (1.65 km). Paying a toll at the southern portal is required in order to traverse the tunnel.

== History ==
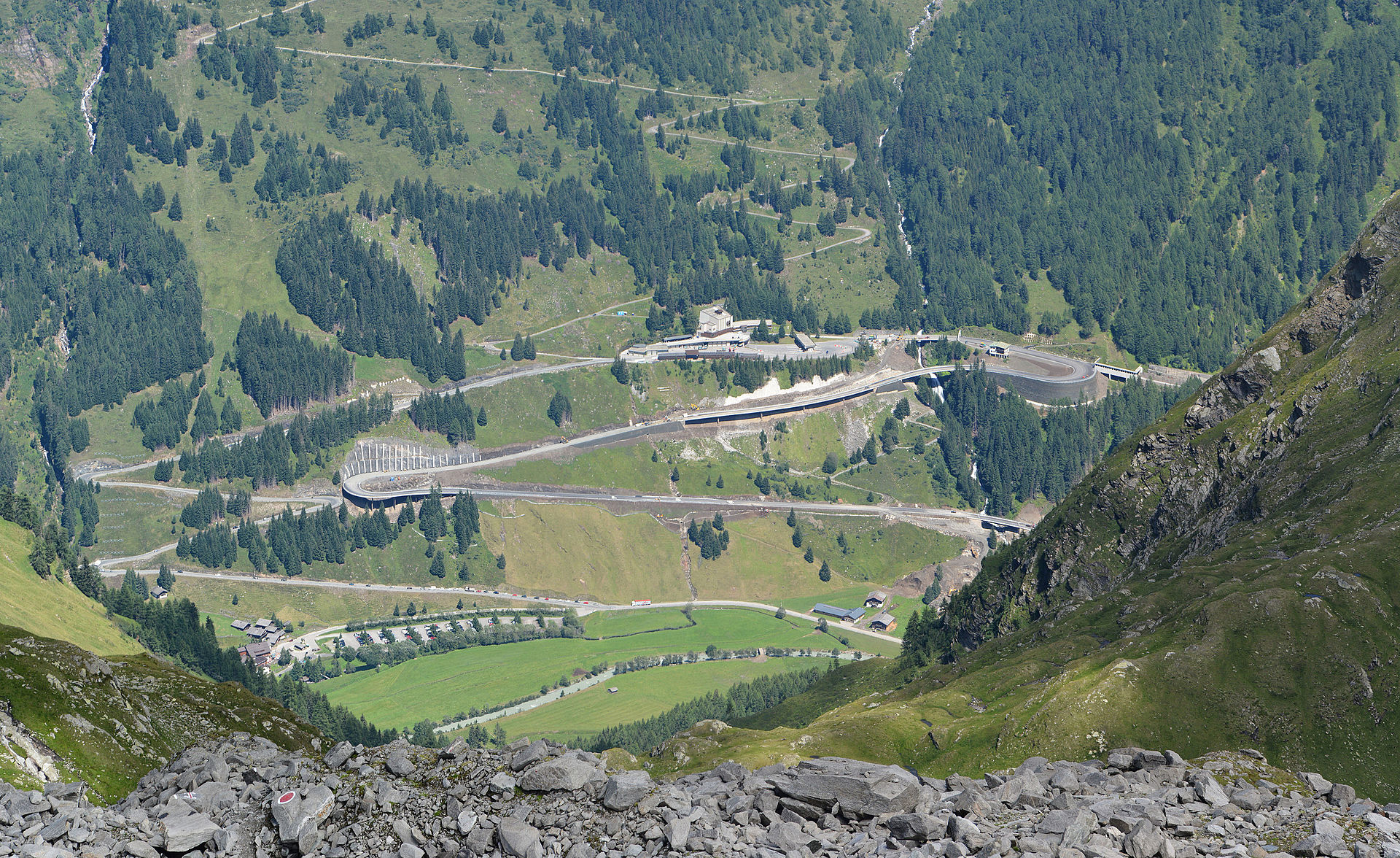
South portal of Felbertauern tunnel in Austria

The pass, also known as Felbertauern, has been in use for centuries. The first contacts between the tribes settling on both sides of the main ridge of the Alps date back to the 2nd millennium BC. Celts, Romans and Carolingians used this crossing. The movement of goods over the Felbertauern was particularly active in the Middle Ages. The transport of goods by horses and mules was an important factor at that time.

After a long break in the early Middle Ages, the Felber Tauern seems to have been used again from the High Middle Ages. This was certainly only the case after the German settlement and thus not before the 9th century – the pass and the valley have an Old High German name (from felwa = pasture). This name was first borne by a local noble family, the Lords of Felben, who owned a mighty residential tower in Mittersill and thus controlled the path early on.

From 1814 onwards, the unification of the court of Matrei, which originally belonged to the Principality of Salzburg, with Tyrol diminished the importance of the Felbertauern. Subsequently, many plans and ideas were pursued to restore the Felbertauern to its former importance, including the planning of a railway line or a Großvenediger High Alpine Road.

Between 1910 and 1912, the owner of Weißenstein Castle in Matrei had a drivable path built through the Prossegg Gorge, which is considered the forerunner of the Felbertauern Road. Since 1 April 1948, Iseltal Straße has been part of the network of federal highways in Austria.

In 1962 a five-year project began to build a 2-lane paved road and a tunnel, replacing the rudimentary road over the pass. In 1967, this new crossing of the Alps was completed, with an official opening on 25 June. The construction took 5 years, and included a 36 km long route - including a 5,313 m long tunnel and 31 km of approach roads.

After the official opening, major portions of the approach roads were completed. Including, for example, the bypass in Mittersill, and converting temporary stretches of the roads into 3-lane roads. Millions of euros were spent on the construction of avalanche protection structures.

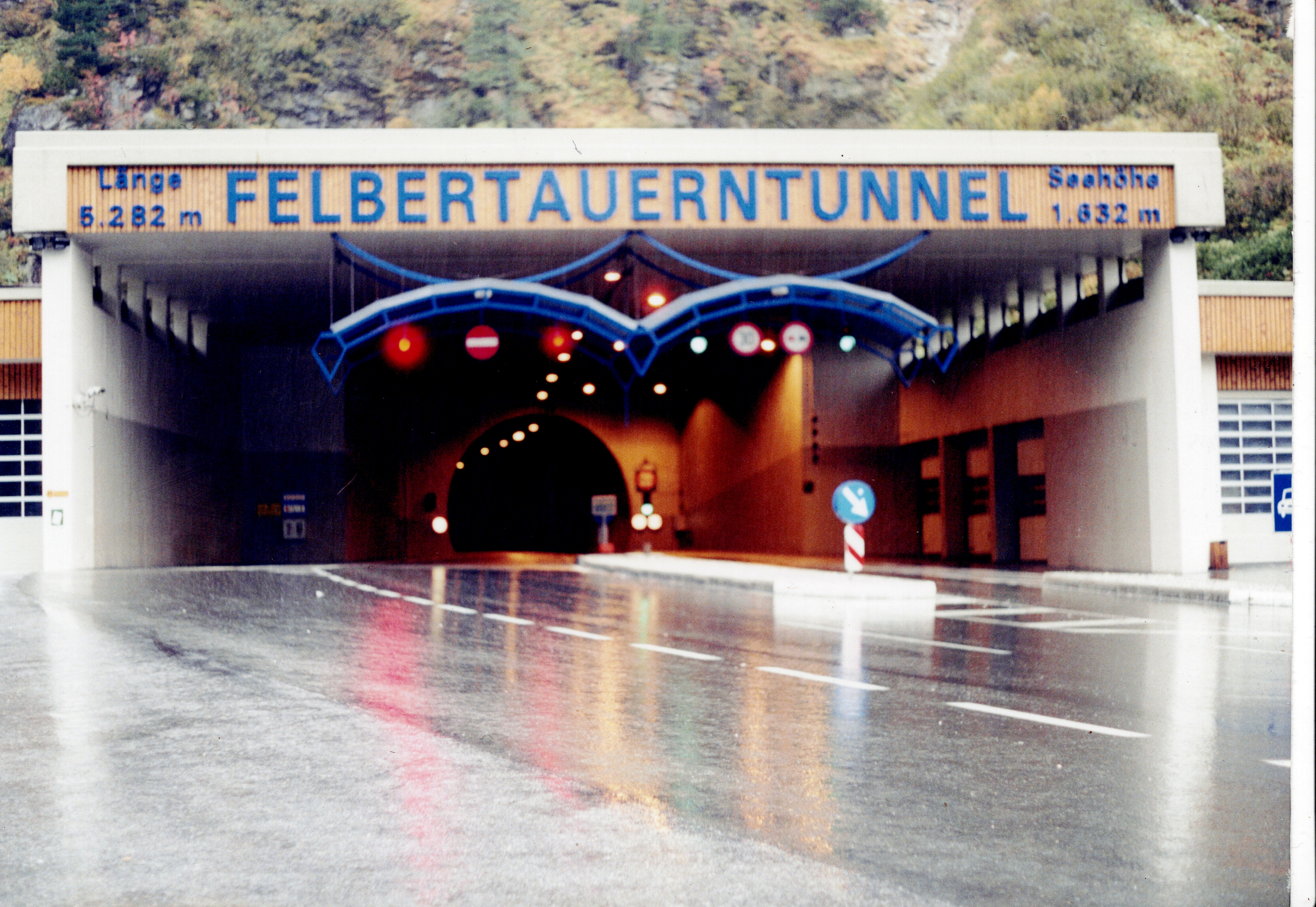
Felbertauern Tunnel Entrance (Austria)

== Ownership ==
The Felbertauern Tunnel is owned by Felbertauernstraßen-AG, which in turn is owned 62% by Austria, and the remaining 38% is split between the state of Tyrol (37%) and the Tyrolean municipalities (1%).

The tunnel is not an autobahn (hence, is not operated by ASFINAG).
