= Lopper II Rail Tunnel =

Railway tunnel in Nidwalden, Switzerland

- Interactive map of Lopper II Rail Tunnel

Overview
- Line: Luzern–Stans–Engelberg
- Location: Nidwalden, Switzerland
- Coordinates: 46.977403°N 8.319437°E
- Status: Active

Operation
- Owner: Zentralbahn
- Operator: Zentralbahn
- Traffic: Rail
- Character: Passenger and freight

Technical
- Length: 1,743 metres (5,719 ft)
- No. of tracks: 1
- Track gauge: 1,000 mm (3 ft 3 3/8 in)
- Electrified: Overhead catenary 11 kV AC 16 2/3 Hz

The Lopper II Rail Tunnel is a railway tunnel in the canton of Nidwalden in central Switzerland. It forms part of the Zentralbahn Luzern–Stans–Engelberg line, which links Lucerne with Engelberg, between Hergiswil station and Stansstad station. It is 1,743 metres (5,719 ft) in length, and carries metre gauge (1,000 mm or 3 ft 3 3/8 in) track electrified at 11 kV AC 16 2/3 Hz using overhead catenary. The tunnel runs under the Lopper, a shoulder of Mount Pilatus which extends into Lake Lucerne, and immediately on leaving the tunnel the line crosses a bridge over the Alpnachersee arm of Lake Lucerne before entering Stansstad station.

The Lopper II Tunnel is paralleled by the Kirchenwald Tunnel carrying the A2 motorway. The nearby Lopper Tunnel I is a rail tunnel on the Zentralbahn Brünig line, the two rail lines joining at Hergiswil station.
