= Arlberg Road Tunnel =

Architectural structure

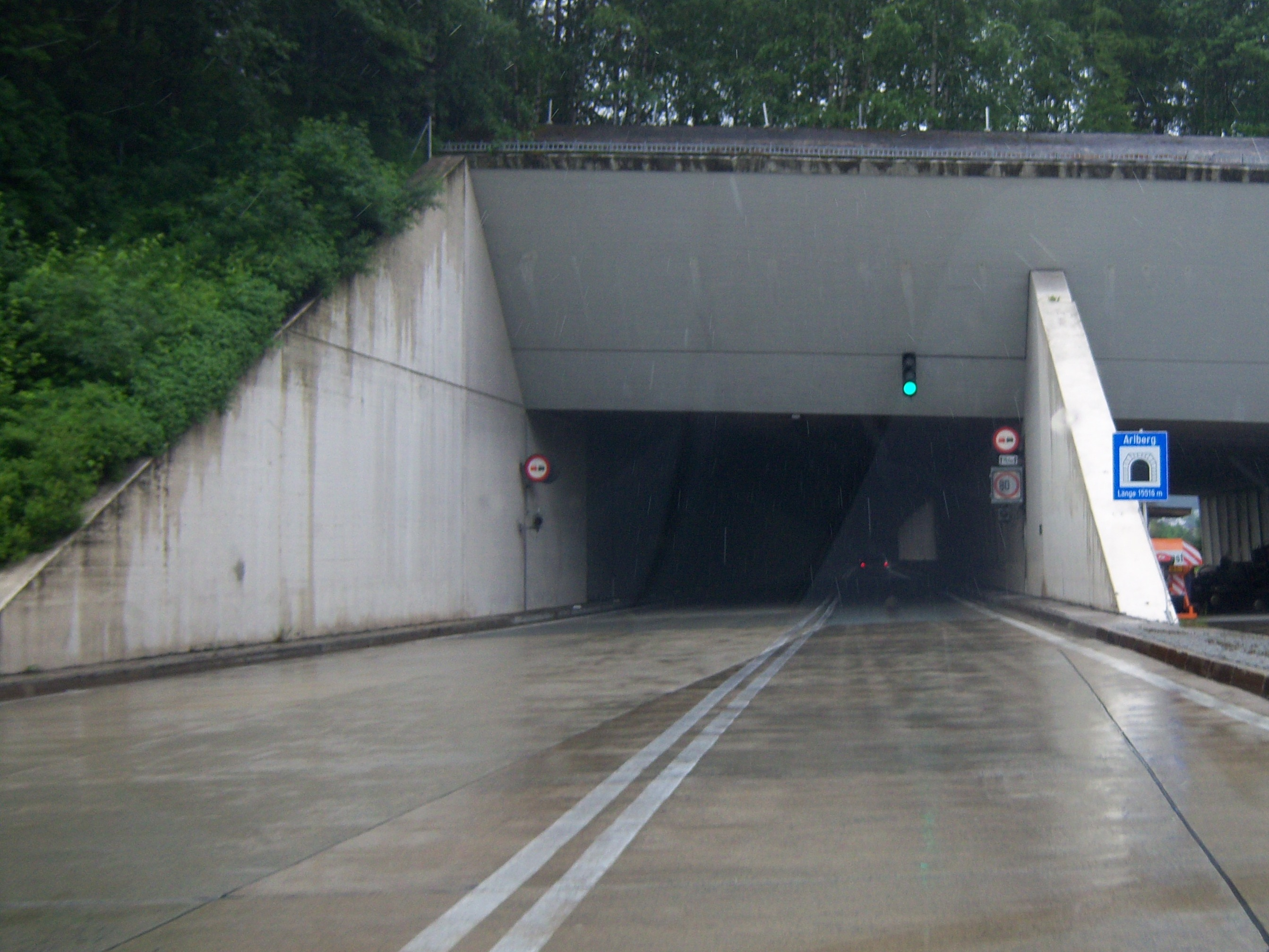
- Gallery at the east portal, view of lane towards Vorarlberg
- Interactive map of Arlberg Road Tunnel

Overview
- Route: E60 S16 (Arlberg Schnellstraße)
- Start: St. Anton am Arlberg, Tyrol; 47.141172°N 10.313269°E
- End: Langen am Arlberg, Vorarlberg; 47.129806°N 10.120006°E

Operation
- Work began: 5 July 1974
- Opened: 1 December 1978
- Operator: ASFiNAG
- Toll: € 13 (January 2026)

Technical
- Length: 13.972 km (8.68 mi) (15.537 km (9.65 mi) including galleries)

The Arlberg Road Tunnel (German: Arlberg Straßentunnel), with a length of 13.976 kilometres (8.684 mi), is Austria's longest road tunnel. When it was inaugurated, it was the longest road tunnel in the world. It carries the S16 Arlberg Schnellstraße (German for "Arlberg Highway") under the Arlberg massif from Tyrol to Vorarlberg.

The tunnel is 1,318 metres (4,324 ft) above sea level with the road above the tunnel having an elevation of 1,793 metres (5,883 ft).

It was built between July 1974 and December 1978, and its costs amounted to 4 billion Austrian schillings (~300 million €). The tunnel is designed for 1800 vehicles per hour and equipped with 4 ventilation centres (one shaft with a height of 736 metres is the deepest in Europe), 12 vents, 43 cameras for traffic monitoring and 16 niches. In 1998 the tunnel was used by 2.6 million vehicles, where 18% are accounting for freight transport. The Arlberg Tunnel is a Toll Road with a one-way fee of €13 (as of January 2026). Tolls for both directions are collected at the eastern end of the tunnel. The maximum allowed speed in the tunnel is 50 mph (80 km/h).

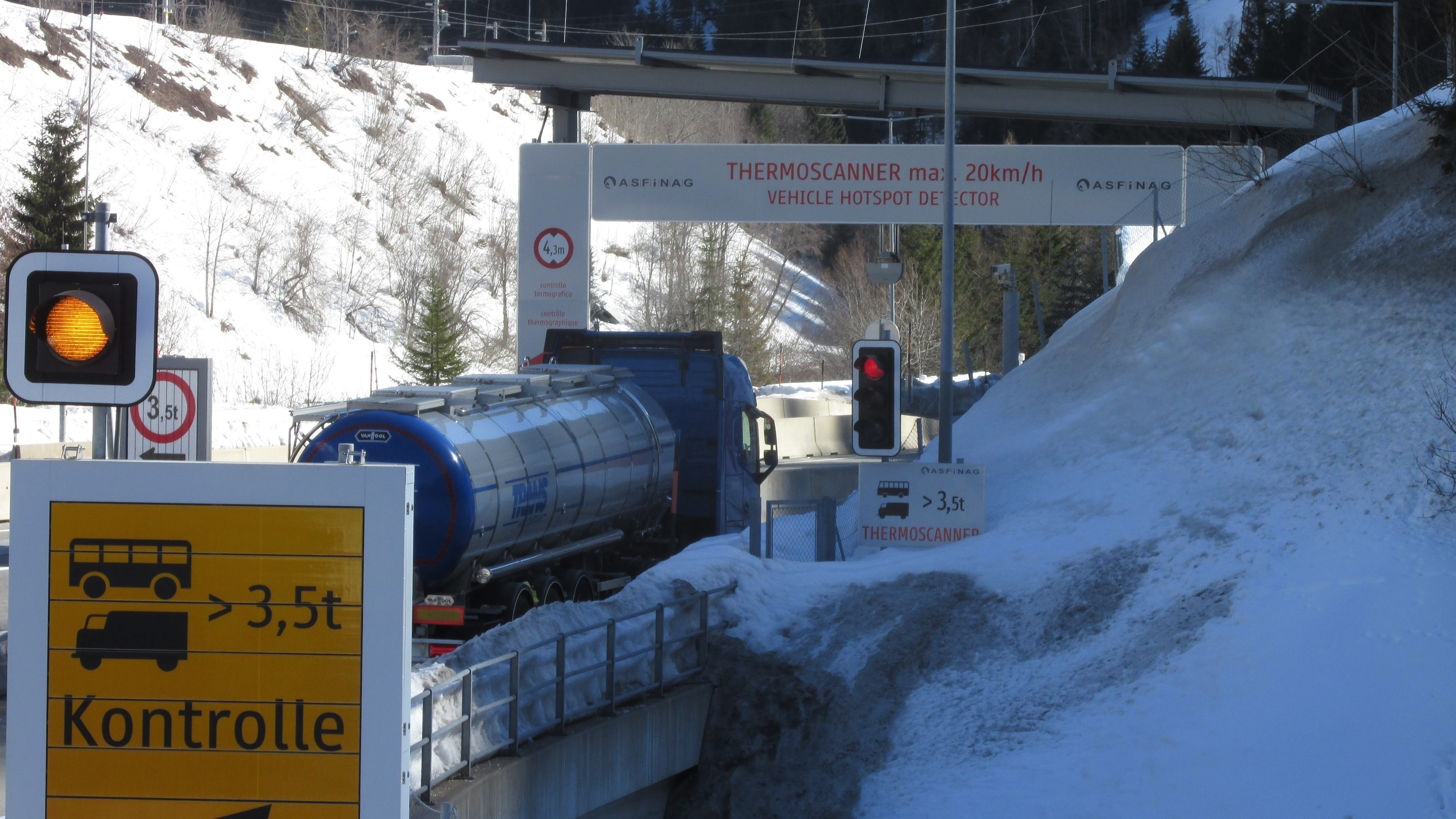
Vehicle Hotspot Detector on the west mouth

In 2015 the Asfinag installed "Vehicle Hotspot Detectors" on both mouths of the tunnel. Trucks and busses with >3,5 t must pass it. The detector checks the temperature from engine, exhaust, brakes and other parts of the vehicles. If they are too hot, it is forbidden to use the tunnel.

In summer 2023 and 2024 the tunnel was closed for five to six months for ground reconstruction works.

== See also ==
- Arlberg Railway Tunnel

Records
Preceded by Mont Blanc Tunnel; 11.61 km (7.21 mi)	World's longest road tunnel 1978–1980	Succeeded by Gotthard Road Tunnel; 16.4 km (10.19 mi)
