= Arlberg Railway Tunnel =

Railway tunnel in Austria

Coordinates: 47°7′43″N 10°11′8″E

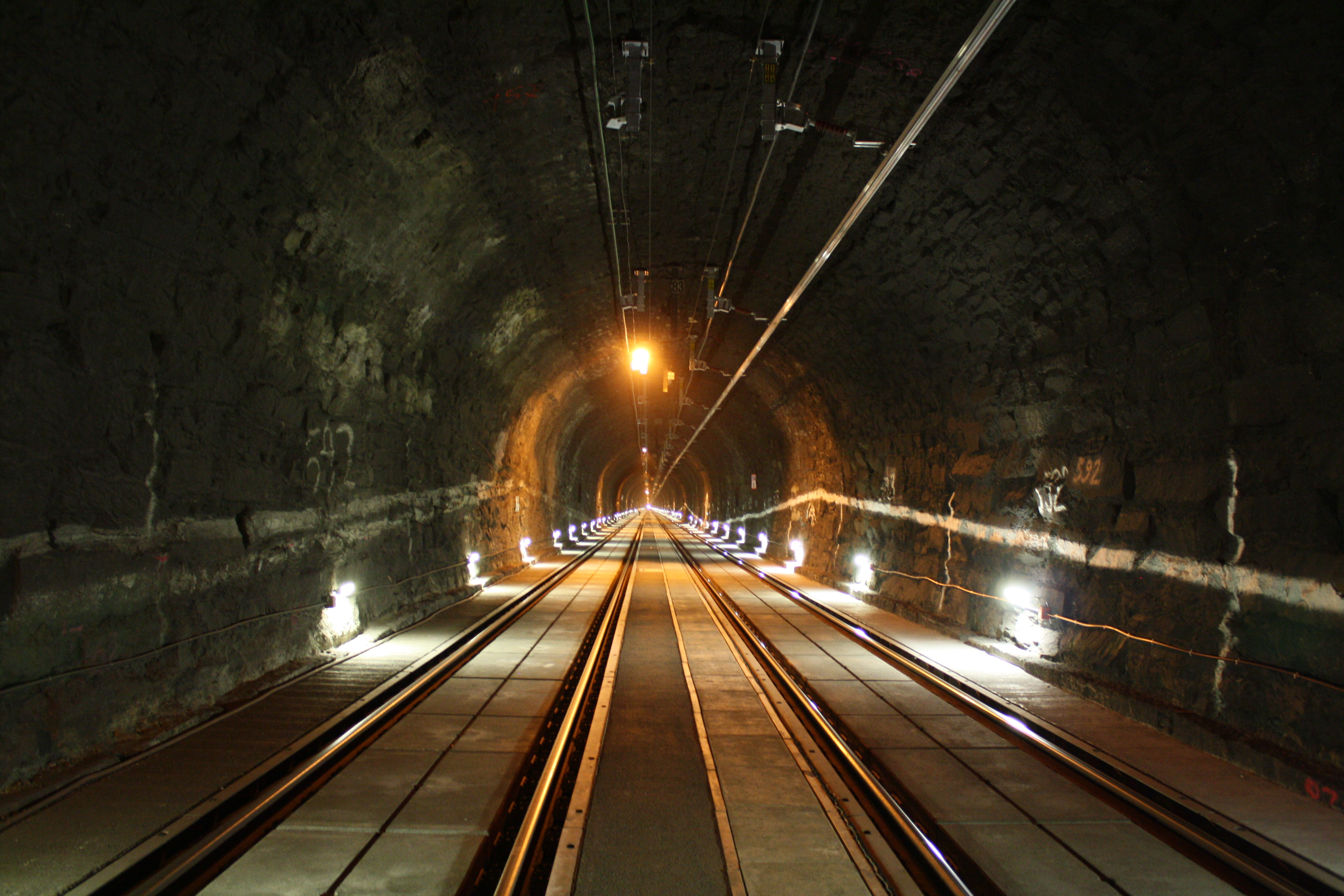
In the central part of the tunnel. It is possible to see the west mouth of the tunnel six kilometres away

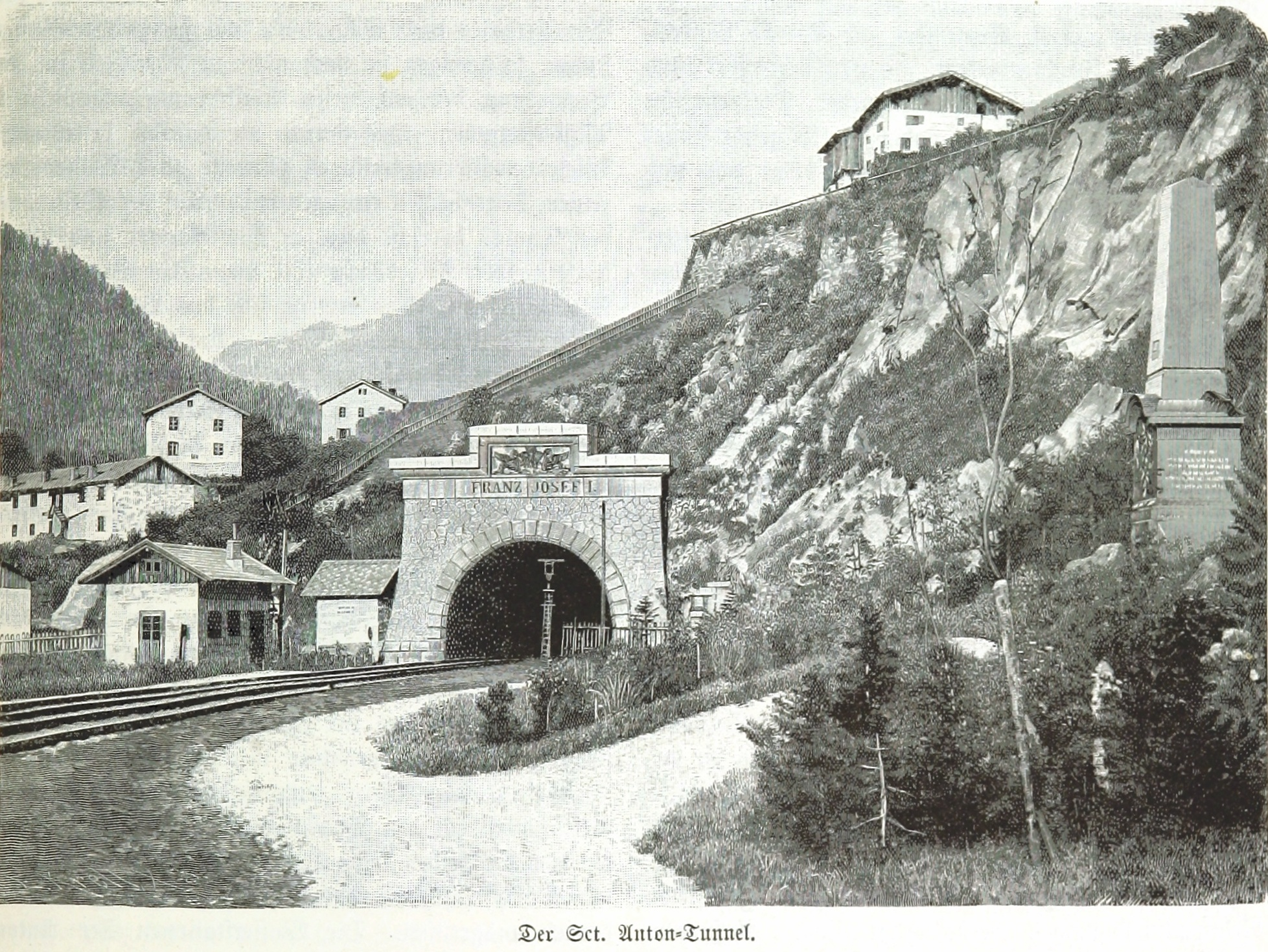
Eastern end in 1894

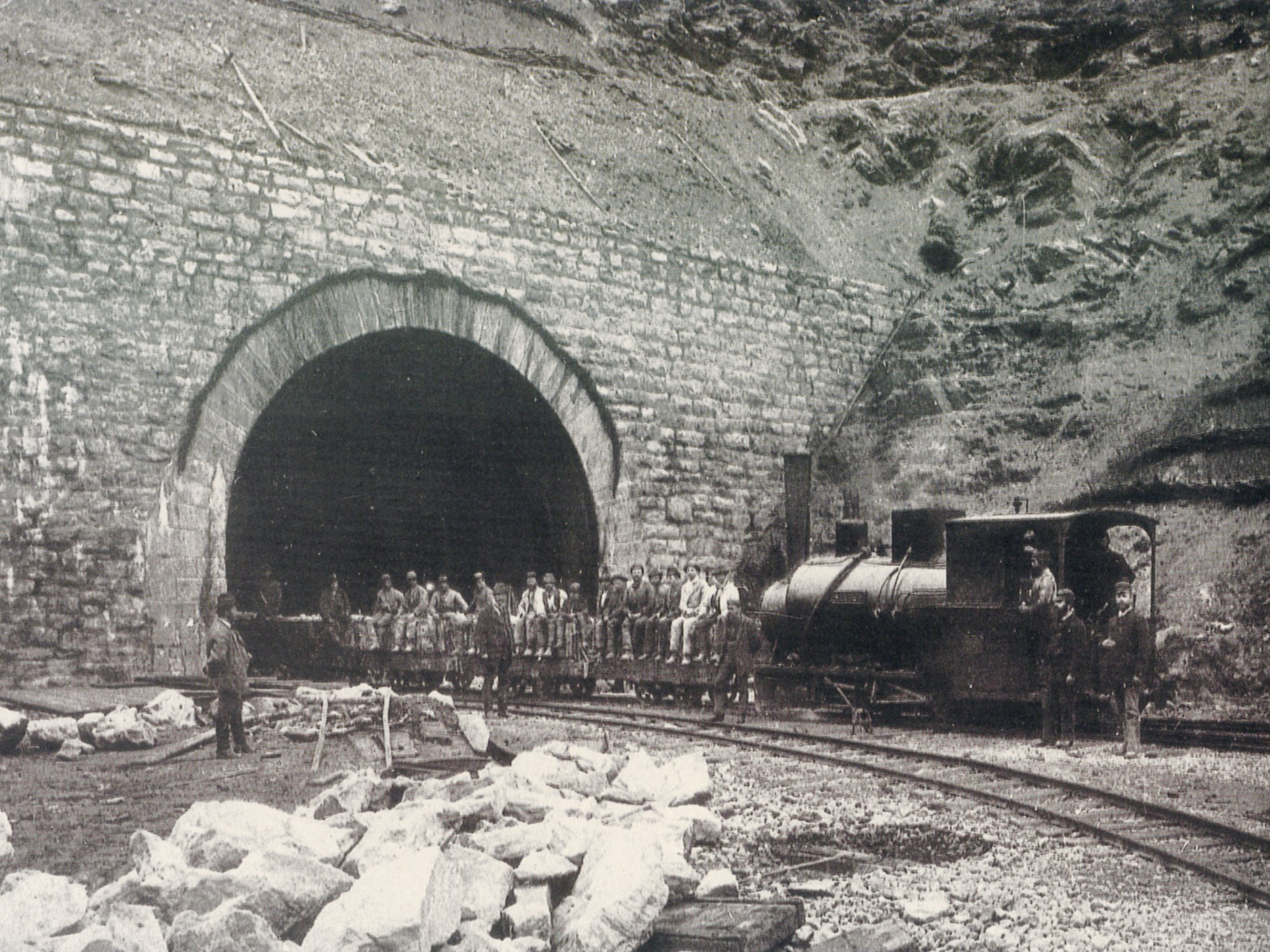
A construction train at the Langen entrance.

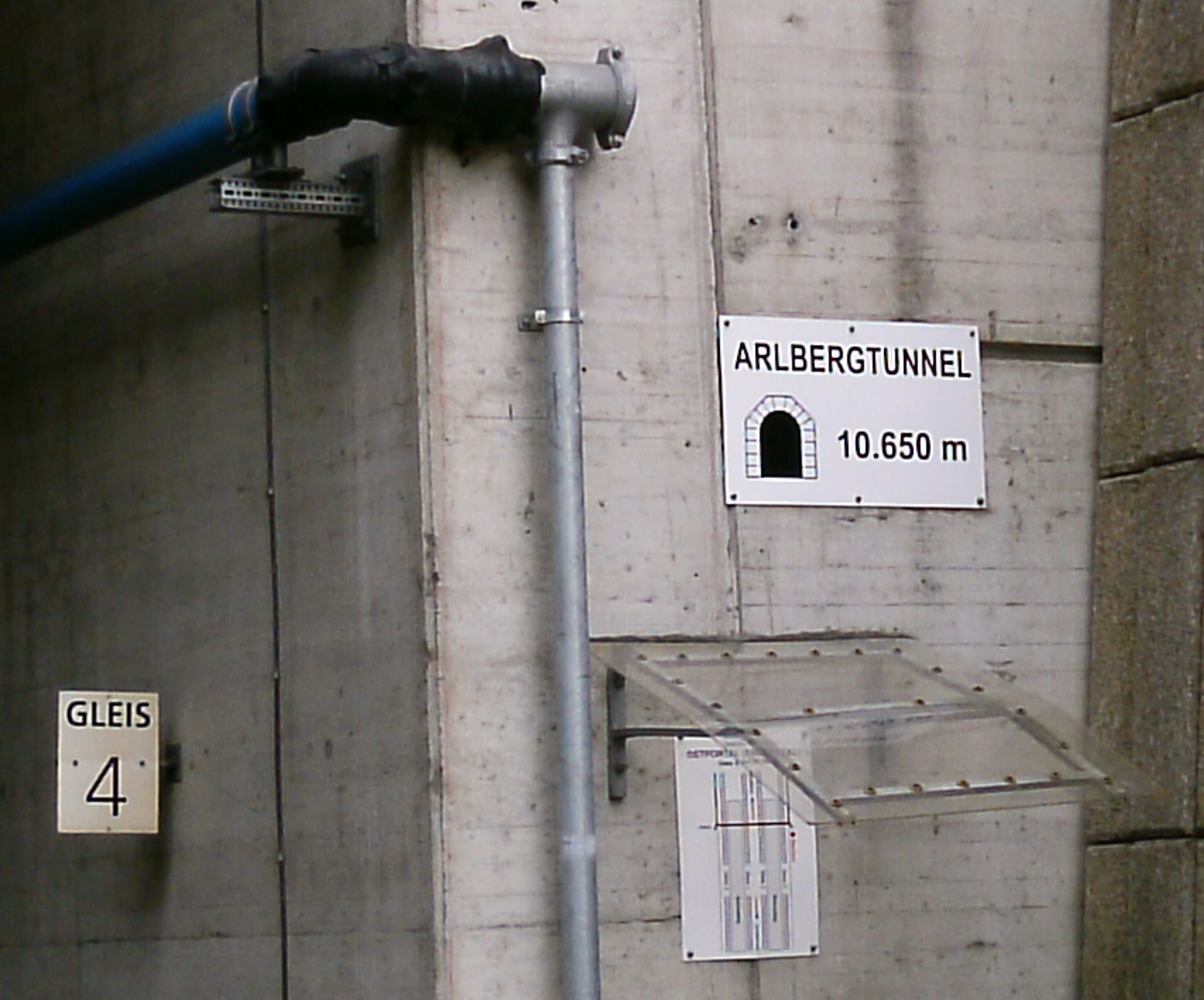
Sign at the eastern end of the railway tunnel

The Arlberg Railway Tunnel (German: Arlbergtunnel) forms the central part of the Arlberg railway in western Austria, running between the federal states Tyrol and Vorarlberg. It traverses through the Arlberg massif at the northeastern end of the Rhaetian Alps.

First opened to traffic in 1884, it was a major engineering achievement of the nation, being the longest railway tunnel in Austria for over 100 years, possessing a length of 10,216 metres (6.348 mi). Originally operated by steam locomotives, the Arlberg Railway Tunnel was reengineered during the 1920s for use by electric traction. During the 2010s, further modifications were implemented to introduce improved safety levels and expand the loading gauge. It is interconnected with the later-built Arlberg Road Tunnel.

== History ==
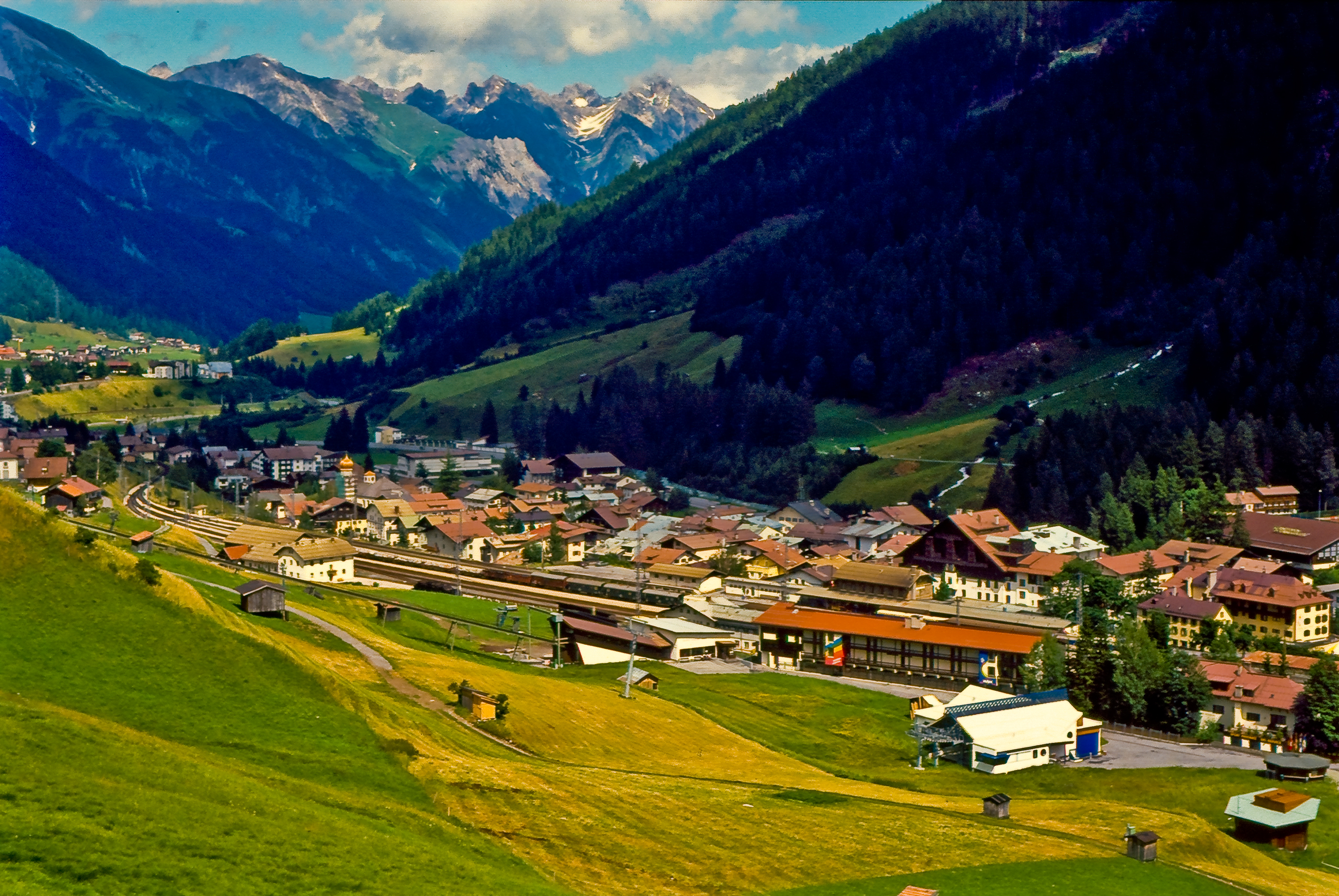
Old St. Anton railway station (1884 - 2001)

The origins of the Arlberg Railway Tunnel is closely associated with the Arlberg railway, of which construction commenced immediately after receiving authorisation to proceed on 16 May 1880. Built at a total cost of 35.5 million gulden, the line had been approved as a single-track railway throughout much of its length; however, the Arlberg tunnel was intentionally constructed with sufficient space to accommodate a double track arrangement from the onset, engineers having anticipated the need to handle higher volumes of traffic than a single line would be able to convey. A large proportion of the Arlberg Railway Tunnel, akin to much of the line's engineered features, comprised natural stone masonry in its construction, using materials such as limestone, gneiss, and mica schist.

The Arlberg Railway Tunnel was a major engineering feature of the line; possessing a length of 10,216 meters, it was the longest railway tunnel in Austria, and would remain so for over one hundred years. On 21 September 1884, it was opened as a single-track tunnel, and rapidly became saturated by heavy traffic. Accordingly, the second parallel track was installed and operational by 15 July 1885. The tunnel starts at near the railway station serving St. Anton am Arlberg and ends in Langen am Arlberg.

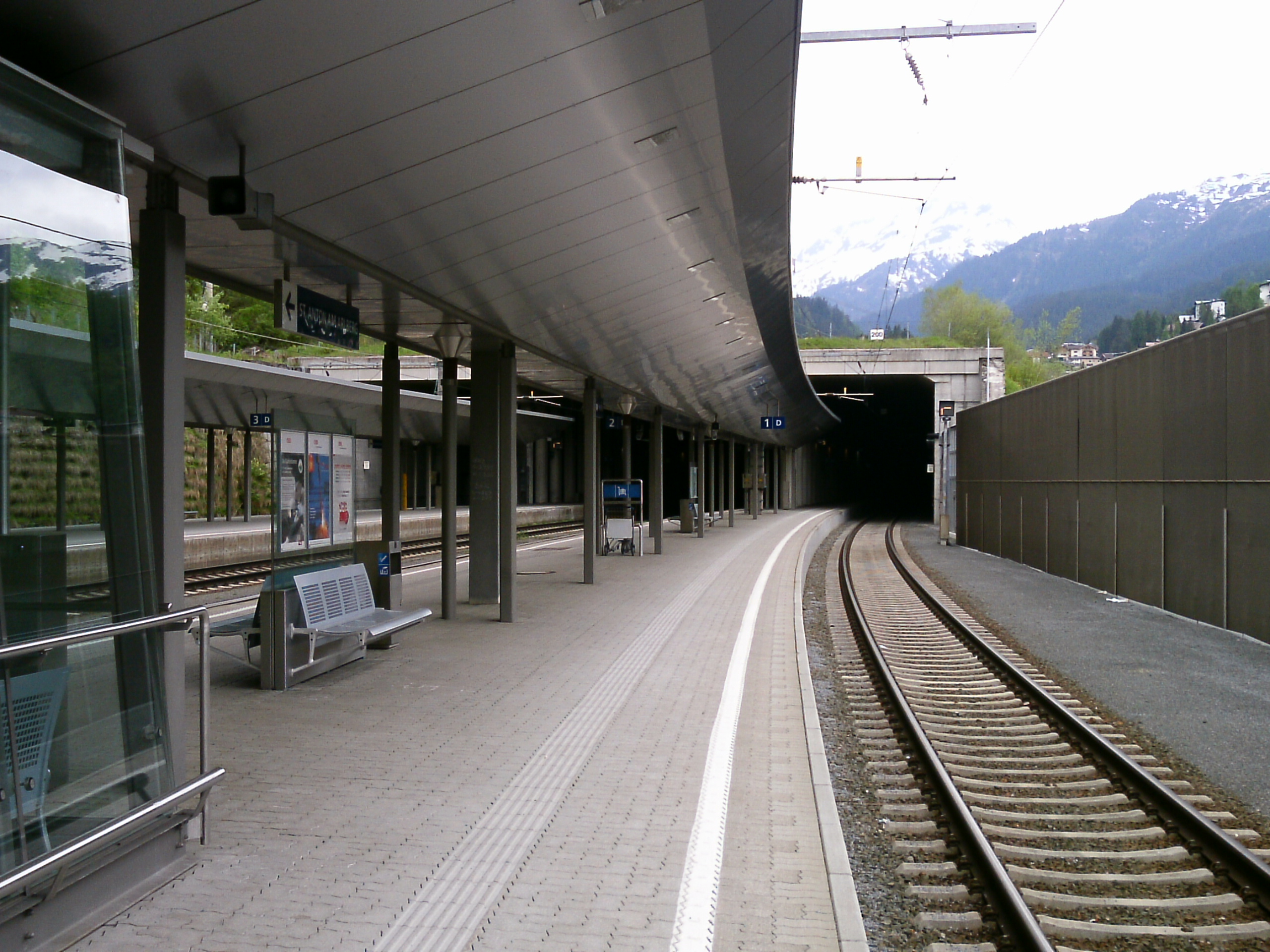
the eastern end and the railway station St. Anton since 2001

Early on, operations became troubled by the tunnel's lack of ventilation; the combination of steam locomotives and inadequate air flow led to dangerous sulphuric acid vapour accumulating along the roof, which compelled locomotive crews to lie on the floor seeking fresher air to breathe. While protective equipment was issued to the crews, the problem was not truly eliminated until the introduction of electric traction during the 1920s. During the 1970s, the interconnecting Arlberg Road Tunnel was built alongside the earlier railway tunnel, there is a minimum distance of 150 metres between the actively-trafficked bores.

In 2001 a new railway station in St. Anton was opened, and the tunnel was built 434 metres longer to east.

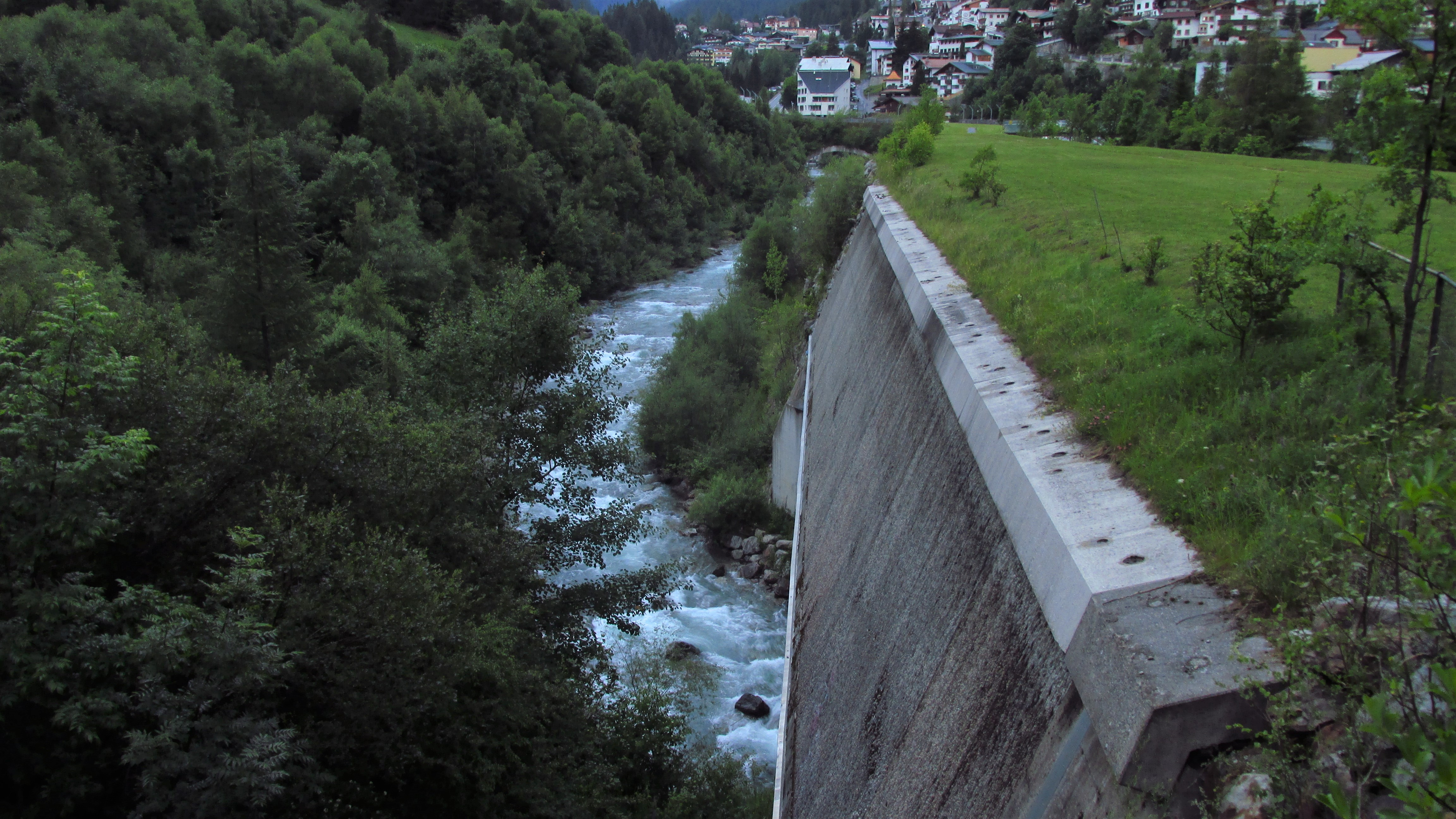
The 434 m long new part of the tunnel, added to 2001, cross the Rosanna river (View to West)

For over 125 years, the tunnel has functioned as the only railway connection between the two Austrian provinces of Tyrol and Vorarlberg; making it a critical piece of infrastructure for the Austrian Federal Railways. Up to 90 trains per day were reportedly using the route on busy days by 2009, resulting in several million tonnes of freight traversing the tunnel during a single year. The top speed in the tunnel is 100 km/h.

During the early twenty-first century, the Austrian Federal Railways began to reengineer elements of the Arlberg line with contemporary safety features. As such, the Arlberg Railway Tunnel was subject to a package of works costing 210 million euros during a temporary closure, this included the addition of seven new evacuation and rescue passaged between it and the adjacent Arlberg Road Tunnel; other safety-related changes included a water supply (for fire-fighting purposes), new orientation lighting, emergency telephone and radio facilities, and overhead line disconnection functionality. These alterations were tempered by a desire to keep the existing tunnel structure relatively intact, avoiding lengthy interruptions to operations; however, the safety measures introduced maintained compliance with existing guidelines and know-how. Furthermore, the loading gauge throughout the tunnel was expanded by lowering the track bed, while a permanent road surface was also added so that emergency vehicles could more readily move inside as well; the renovated tunnel was put back into service during late 2010.

== See also ==
- Arlberg railway
- Arlberg Road Tunnel
