= Gleinalm Tunnel =

Road tunnel in Styria, Austria

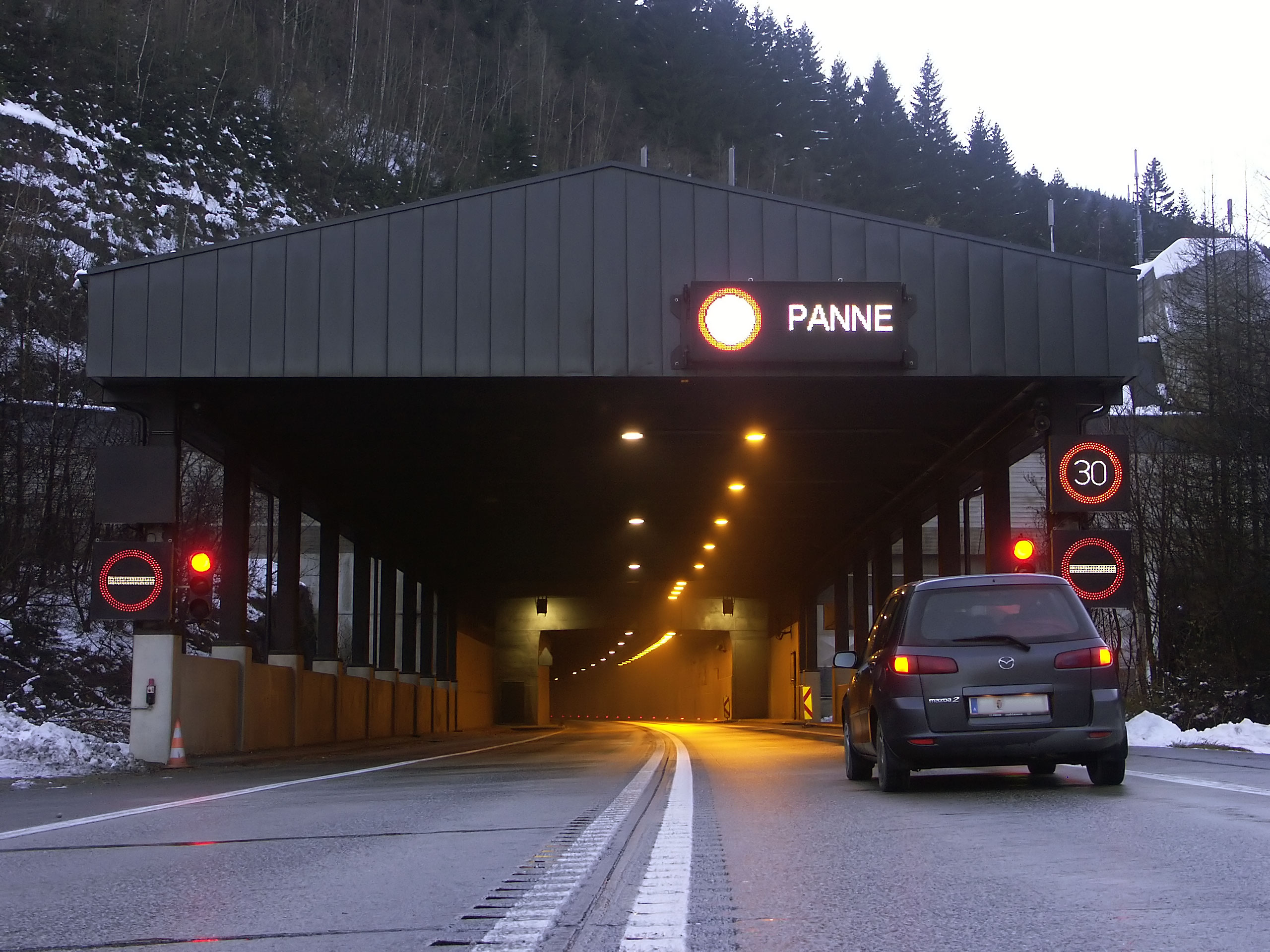
- South portal of the Gleinalm Tunnel.
- Interactive map of Gleinalm Tunnel

Overview
- Location: Gleinalpe
- Coordinates: North portal 47°17′39.8″N 15°4′40.4″E; South portal 47°14′54.3″N 15°9′32.9″E
- Route: Pyhrn Autobahn

Operation
- Constructed: 1973-1978 (Renovation: 2013-2019)
- Operator: Asfinag
- Toll: 10.00 Euro

Technical
- Length: 8,320 m (27,300 ft)
- No. of lanes: 2
- Operating speed: 100 km/h

The Gleinalm Tunnel (German: Gleinalmtunnel) is a highway tunnel in Styria, Austria. It lies along the Pyhrn Autobahn and it is 8320 m long. It connects the district of Leoben with the district Graz-Umgebung. It was opened on 1978.

The tunnel was in part built as an alternative route from Graz to the Murau District and the Murtal district, shortening the trip by about 20 minutes.

Currently the tunnel has only one tube with oncoming traffic. The speed limit is 80 km/h and it has a toll of 10 euro.

A second tube is under construction since 21 September 2013. The whole project will cost about 299 million euro. The new tube was opened on 21 July 2017: both tunnels will be in service until September 2017, after which the old tube will be closed for renovation. Both tubes will definitively open in 2019 according to the project plan.
