= Plabutsch Tunnel =

Road tunnel in Austria

Coordinates: 47.0333°N 15.4067°E

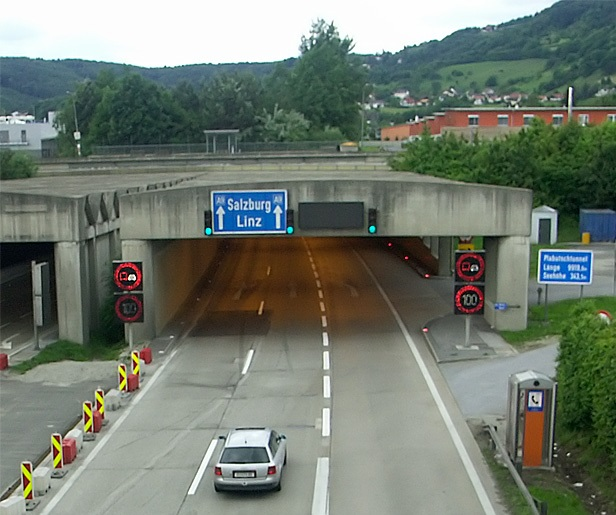
Southern entrance of the Plabutsch tunnel

The Plabutsch Tunnel is an approximately 10 km long (east tunnel 9919m, west tunnel 10,085m) road tunnel in Austria which bypasses Graz on its western side.
