= R2 expressway (Slovakia) =

Expressway in Slovakia

Expressway R2
- Rýchlostná cesta R2
- Completed Under construction Planned

Route information
- Part of E58 E77 E571 E572
- Length: 338.4 km (210.3 mi) Completed: 68.2 km (42.4 mi); Under Construction: 23.4 km (14.5 mi); Planned: 246.7 km (153.3 mi); The lengths are stated without concurrences

Major junctions
- From: D1 near Chocholná
- R8 near Hradište (planned); R3 near Ráztočno (planned); R1 near Žiar nad Hronom; R3 Budča; R1 near Sliač (planned); R7 near Lučenec (planned)
- To: R4 near Haniska (planned)

Location
- Country: Slovakia
- Regions: Trenčín Region, Banská Bystrica Region, Košice Region
- Major cities: Trenčín, Prievidza, Žiar nad Hronom, Zvolen, Lučenec, Rožňava

Highway system
- Highways in Slovakia
← R1	→ R3

R2 is an expressway (Slovak: rýchlostná cesta) in Slovakia, which begins near Trenčín and ends near Košice. It passes Bánovce nad Bebravou, Prievidza, Žiar nad Hronom, Zvolen, Lučenec, Rimavská Sobota and Rožňava. Sections between Žiar nad Hronom and Zvolen are shared with R1 and R3. There is also a planned shared section between Ráztočno and Žiar nad Hronom with R3.

In view of the current intentions of the Ministry of Transport, the entire length of the expressway cannot be expected to be operational before 2050.

== Chronology ==
In October 2012, work began on an almost 6 kilometres (3.7 mi) half-profile bypass around Žiar nad Hronom, which was put into operation on 15 December 2014.

On 10 November 2015, a 10.4 kilometres (6.5 mi) long section Pstruša–Kriváň (under construction since 2013) was opened to traffic for a cost of EUR 177 million, after construction there was completed by Doprastav.

The 7.8 kilometres (4.8 mi) section between Zvolen East and Pstruša was put into operation in May 2017, receiving a EUR 44 million contribution from the European Union.

A 13.5 kilometres (8.4 mi) section Mýtna – Lovinobaňa, Tomášovce was opened in late 2022.

Under construction since March 2020, the 9.2 kilometres (5.7 mi) long section Kriváň–Mýtna was financed from the state budget, and was carried out by a consortium of Doprastav, Strabag and Eurovia SK/CZ. The section opened to traffic on 20 November 2025, and features the longest highway bridge in Slovakia.

A further 14.3 kilometres (8.9 mi) of the R2 was being built near Košice, South – Košické Oľšany, where the R2 is being shared with R4. Construction there began in March 2022 at a total cost of EUR 202 million with VAT, cofinanced by the European Union. The section was opened in September 2025.

=== Future development ===
Several sections of the R2 are under planning or in development.

== See also ==
- Highways in Slovakia
- Transport in Slovakia
- Controlled-access highway
- Limited-access road
