= R8 expressway (Slovakia) =

Expressway in Slovakia

Expressway R8
- Rýchlostná cesta R8
- Completed Under construction Planned

Route information
- Length: 0.0 km (0 mi; 0 ft) Planned: 54.6 km (33.9 mi)

Major junctions
- From: R1 near Nitra (planned)
- To: R2 near Hradište (planned)

Location
- Country: Slovakia
- Regions: Nitra Region, Trenčín Region
- Major cities: Nitra, Topoľčany

Highway system
- Highways in Slovakia
← R7

Expressway R8 (Slovak: Rýchlostná cesta R8) is a planned expressway in Slovakia, which after construction will connect Nitra, Topoľčany and Bánovce nad Bebravou. The expressway will lead in the corridor R1 and R2.

The total length of the R8 will be 54.6 kilometres (33.9 mi). The construction of the expressway is expected only after 2030, not excluding the possible reassessment of the need for the road. According to the current plans of the Ministry of Transport, no sections of the R8 road will be constructed or open until 2028. With regard to the current intentions of the Ministry of Transport, the operation of the expressway along the entire length of the route cannot be expected before the year 2050.

== History ==
The inclusion of this stretch in Slovakia's expressway network was considered long ago, but the government of the Slovak Republic gave a definitive promise to prepare studies and documents for the start of construction by resolution no. 492/2008.

Originally, the R8 was expected to flow into R2 near the village of Hradište, but in the end the route after Bánovce nad Bebravou was preferred. At the environmental impact assessment (EIA) stage, the feasibility of three main variants with lengths of 54.64116 km, 56.54203 km and 53.74952 km is assessed.

The R8 expressway was included in the list of expressways upon the entry into force of the Act on Road Traffic on 1 February 2009.

== See also ==
- Highways in Slovakia
- Transport in Slovakia
- Controlled-access highway
- Limited-access road
