= R3 expressway (Slovakia) =

Expressway in Slovakia

Expressway R3
- Rýchlostná cesta R3
- Completed Under construction Planned

Route information
- Part of E58 E77 E572
- Length: 19.7 km (12.2 mi) Planned: 200 km (120 mi); The lengths are stated without concurrences

Major junctions
- From: DK7 border with Poland (planned)
- D1 near Likavka (planned); D1 near Martin; R2 near Ráztočno (planned); R1 near Žiar nad Hronom; R1 Budča; R7 near Horné Semerovce (planned)
- To: M2 border with Hungary (planned)

Location
- Country: Slovakia
- Regions: Žilina Region, Trenčín Region, Banská Bystrica Region, Nitra Region
- Major cities: Dolný Kubín, Martin, Žiar nad Hronom

Highway system
- Highways in Slovakia
← R2	→ R4

R3 is a mostly planned expressway (Slovak: rýchlostná cesta) passing through central Slovakia in a north–south direction along European route E77.

It goes from the Hungarian border, moving North bound around Krupina to Zvolen, from there it is currently planned to share an 18km section with R1 and R2 from Budča to Žiar nad Hronom. It is planned to share a section between Žiar nad Hronom and Ráztočno near Handlová with R2. The route then continues North, from Martin sharing a section with the D1 before splitting off in Hubová, going from Dolný Kubín through the Orava River valley to Trstená and ending at Polish border. The motorway goes along the route I/59, I/18, I/65 and through I/66

From the total length of approximately 230km (excluding shared sections), these sections are currently in operation:

- 9.2km Trstená - Nižná (two-lane)
- 5.7km Oravský Podzámok - Horná Lehota (two-lane)
- 1.7km Martin - Martin, North
- 4.3km Horná Štubňa bypass (two-lane)

The route R3, is designed in three parts. In the North from Trstená to the intersection with the D1 highway in Likavka. In the central part from the intersection with the D1 highway in Martin to the intersection with the expressway along the route R2 in Ráztoč and in the Southern part from the intersection with the R1 expressway in Budča to the state border of Slovakia with Hungary near Šahy. Here the R3 will connect to the Hungarian highway M2. Currently there are no plans to connect route R3 to the Polish highway network in the North, as there are no highway construction plans on the Polish side. This can however change in the future. In 2019, a technical study was conducted in Poland for the construction of a connecting section of the Polish expressway S7, from the current termination in Rabka-Zdrój to the state border with a prospective connection to the R3 road. The technical study of this section was completed at the end of 2020, Poland is planning to construct a high-capacity four-lane highway. Between Šahy and Dudince, the R3 road will intersect with the R7 road.[2][3]

The total length of the R3, with the exception of toll roads, i.e. sections that the R3 route shares with other highways and expressways, is approximately 200 km. In the case of the route of the southern part of this road, in the section roughly between Zvolen and the state border with Hungary, the technical study also allows the possibility of ending the road R3 in Štúrovo instead of Šahy and at the same time, the technical study also allows the possibility of the route of the road R3 through Hronský Beňadik instead of Budča. The specific route of the R3 road in the southern section has not yet been determined. The southern section of the R3 expressway is at the same time the oldest in terms of plans, as the highway in this corridor is already mentioned in the Resolution of the Government of the Czechoslovak Republic No. 286/1963 from 1963. This resolution envisaged the construction of highway No. 66 in the section from Zvolen directly south to Šahy.

The lengths and routes of individual sections listed below are based on provisional construction plans in 2020, but considering the fact that many sections of the R3 road are only at the beginning, it is almost certain that the lengths and routes of unbuilt sections will still change. In 2020, there was a total change in the routing in the area of Dolný Kubín and in the section from the D1 highway to Dolný Kubín. Road R3 is to be implemented to a considerable extent as a reconstruction or completion of the existing road I/59. The R3 road through the town of Dolný Kubín has been newly extended. The planned intersection of the R3 road with the D1 highway was moved from the Hubová location to the Likavka location.

The international route E77 passes along the route of road R3. R3 will lighten traffic on the Kremnické Bane mountain pass, which is located on I/65. Construction on almost the entire length of R3 will require the relocation of roads, watercourses and engineering networks, as part of environmental protection, sewerage with the separation of oil substances and noise barriers will be built. The construction of two tunnels is tentatively planned for the R3 route; Biela Skala (630m) and Sklené (3450m). Both tunnels are located on the planned Horná Štubňa - Ráztočno section. According to the current plans of the Ministry of Transport, with the exception of the section near Tvrdošín, no sections of the R3 road will be constructed or open until 2028. Sections at a high level of preparation were not included in the plans either. With regard to the current intentions of the Ministry of Transport, the operation of the expressway along the entire length of the route cannot be expected before the year 2050.[4][5][6]

== Junctions of the R3 ==
Section order	Section designation	length of the section in km	Start of construction section	Opening of section	Exits and junctions
1.?	Border crossing SK/PL - Trstená	cca. 3,5	Depends on agreement of SR a PR	Depends on agreement of SR a PR	Section without exits
1.	Trstená bypass, left side	7,2	Not included in the plan before year 2028	?	901. connection onto the route I/59; 1. Trstená, completion; 2. Tvrdošín, completion
1.	Trstená bypass, right side	7,2	2008	2010	901. temporary connection on I/59; 1. Trstená; 2. Tvrdošín
2.	Tvrdošín - Nižná nad Oravou, Left side	4,4	Not included in the plan before year 2028	?	3. Nižná, completion
2.	Tvrdošín - Nižná nad Oravou, Right side	4,4	2021	2025	3. Nižná
3.	Nižná nad Oravou - Dlhá nad Oravou, Left side	8,3	Not included in the plan before year 2028	?	4. Podbiel, completion
3.	Nižná nad Oravou - Dlhá nad Oravou, right side	8,3	Not included in the plan before year 2028	?	4. Podbiel
4.	Dlhá nad Oravou - Sedliacka Dubová, left side	4,9	Not included in the plan before year 2028	?	5. Dlhá nad Oravou, completion
4.	Dlhá nad Oravou - Sedliacka Dubová, right side	4,9	Not included in the plan before year 2028	?	5. Dlhá nad Oravou
5.	Oravský Podzámok-Horná Lehota, left side	6,4	Not included in the plan before year 2028	?	Section without exits
5.	Oravský Podzámok-Horná Lehota, Right side	6,4	2004	2007	902.Temporary connection on I/59 - east 903.Temporary connection on I/59 - west
6.	Oravský Podzámok - Dolný Kubín, south	10,9	Not included in the plan before year 2028	?	6. Široká; 7. Kocmáľ; 8. Dolný Kubín - centre; 9. Jasenová
7.	Dolný Kubín, south - Likavka, Junction	8,7	Not included in the plan before year 2028	?	10. Valaská Dubová; 11. Likavka, junction R3xD1
8.	Martin - Sever, junction R3xD1) - Martin	1,5	2011	2015	12. Martin - Sever, junction R3xD1; 13. Martin
9.	Martin - Rakovo	14	Not included in the plan before year 2028	?	13. Martin - completion; 14. Rakovo
10.	Rakovo - Mošovce	10,3	Not included in the plan before year 2028	?	sections without exits
11.	Mošovce - Horná Štubňa	7,9	Not included in the plan before year 2028	?	15. Mošovce; 16. Horná Štubňa
12.	Horná Štubňa bypass, right side	4,7	Not included in the plan before year 2028	?	section without exits
12.	Horná Štubňa bypass, left side	4,7	2008	2010	904. temporary connection on route I/65 - sever; 905. temporary connection on route I/65 - juh
13.	Horná Štubňa - Ráztočno, junction R3xR2	14	Not included in the plan before year 2028	?	17. Sklené; 18. Ráztočno - junction R3xR2
14.	Budča - Krupina	27	Not included in the plan before year 2028	?	19. Zvolen - west; 20. Dobrá Niva; 21. Babiná
15.	Krupina, bypass	6,5	Not included in the plan before year 2028	?	22. Krupina - north; 23. Krupina - south
16.	Krupina - Šahy	35,5	Not included in the plan before year 2028	?	24. Hontianske Nemce; 25. Dudince; 26. Semerovce
17.	Šahy - border crossing SK/HU	4,8	Not included in the plan before year 2028	?	27. Šahy - sever; 906. Temporary connection on route I/66 resp. Permanent on Hungarian motorway M2

== Future of construction ==
=== Part Tvrdošín - Nižná nad Oravou, first half, under construction ===
Overview of the section under construction
length of section	4,4 km	date of start of construction	March 2022	Total construction costs without VAT (NDS a.s. estimate before concluding the contract)	202 million EUR
Contractor	Hochtief SK s.r.o., PORR s.r.o., Hydroekol Dolný Kubín, spol. Ltd.	Contractual end of construction	March 2025	Total construction costs without VAT (Amount in terms of the contract)	€132.6 million
Construction supervision	NDS a.s.	Presumption of passage of the section	March 2025	The order of the winning bid in public procurement	The second cheapest
				The cheapest offer in public procurement without VAT	€123.6 million
Comment: The length of this R3 section is 4.4 km, despite the fact that NDS a.s. declares its length as 5.5 km. The reason is that the section was shortened because the end of the section was projected beyond the Nižná exit. Part of the section from the Nižná exit would thus not be open to traffic until the following southern section is open to traffic, which, however, was not included in the construction plan until 2028. From the north side, this section connects to the already traveled R3 Trstená bypass, 7.2 km long. The section, like all existing sections of R3, is currently being implemented only in a half profile from the R24.5/100 category. Part of the 260 m long section from km 3,900 to km 4,160 (to bridge 206) will be built in a full profile due to an easier connection to the Nižná exit. Beyond bridge 206 to the end of the section, only the right (western) half-profile of the expressway will be built, which will be connected by the branch of the Nižná exit to the Nižná feeder. After the crossing, this 4.4 km long section will replace 4.7 km of the I/59 road. The section starts north of the village of Nižná. From there, the Nižná feeder will take the traffic to the R3 road itself, which will be led along the eastern bank of the Orava river until it connects to the previous, already passable section of the Trstená bypass. This section of R3 will effectively form a complete bypass of Tvrdošín. The construction also includes the Nižná feeder, which will be connected to the I/59 road through the roundabout Nižná - north. The construction will include 6 bridges, including one bridge on the branch of the Nižná exit, two bridges on the feeder Nižná, one bridge on the branch of the Tvrdošín exit, one bridge over R3, the Tvrdošín rest area, noise barriers and frame walls. The construction also includes the reconstruction of one bridge, the modification of one temporary bridge over the Oravica river at the Tvrdošín exit and the construction of one temporary bridge over the Orava river at the Nižná feeder. The competition for the construction of this section was launched in the summer of 2017 and lasted for almost four years, during which three governments took turns. The cause of such large delays was poor-quality preparation of tender materials and disproportionately long decision-making processes in NDS a.s. as well as the Office for Public Procurement. Construction began in March 2021, the construction is expected to be completed in June 2023.
Template:Minivlajka Výstavba tohto úseku diaľnice je financovaná z rozpočtu Európskej Únie. Výstavbu diaľnice projektuje, objednáva a koordinuje NDS a.s. v spolupráci s Ministerstvom dopravy a výstavby SR.

=== Trstená bypass ===
The Trstená bypass on the R3 was under construction since April 2008 and after 30 months it was completed on 29 October 2010 the section is completely paved and handed over in half profile. The construction was financed from the state budget and was implemented by the companies VÁHOSTAV – SK, a. with. and Inžinierske stavby, a. with. . The length of the section is 7.2 km. There are 14 bridges and 3 intersections on the section, including two level crossings at both ends as a temporary connection to the roadI/59.

=== Tvrdošín – Nižná ===
Tvrdošín – Nižná is a section of R3 under construction. Due to the lack of funding for the construction of this section in 2018, its construction did not start until 3 years later. Its length is 4.4 km. It is being built for €62 million. The route runs on the left bank of the Oravy. There will be 14 bridge objects, 2 extra-level intersections and a large left-side rest area Tvrdošín. The contract for construction in a half profile was signed 25 February 2021 with a completion date of 2023.

=== Nižná – Dlhá nad Oravou ===
The planned section will extend R3 to the village of Dlhá nad Oravou by a length of 8.6 km. Construction was to begin in 2019 and completion was planned for 2022. The state will finance the section with a budget of €94,602,668.80 (SKK 2,850,000,000) according to plans from 2006. The route runs parallel to II/584. The Podbiel tunnel, 515 meters long, 19 bridges, and a level crossing is planned here.

== Dlhá nad Oravou – Sedliacka Dubová ==
The section Dlhá nad Oravou – Sedliacka Dubová will extend the R3 by 4.2 km. The construction was planned for the years 2015–2017, while according to the plans from 2006, the construction should cost €48,131,182.37 (SKK 1,450,000,000). The section includes the Dlha nad Oravou and Sedliacká Dubová bypasses, 11 bridges, and a level crossing. The route will be built on varied geological ground.

== Horna lehota - oravsky podzamok ==
Section R3 between Horná Lehota and Oravský Podzámok is a section of R3 in use since 2007, although only in half profile. The length of the section is 6.442 km, its construction took place in the years 2004 - 2007 by the companies Váhostav - SK, a.s., Max Bogl and Skanska, a.s., the construction was financed by the state budget. The section replaced I/59, which increased the flow and safety of traffic. According to STN 736100, category R11.5/100 was used for the section, as a result of which the maximum permitted speed is limited to 100 km/h. There are 9 bridges on the route, one of which is dominant over the Orava River and the railway, 750 meters long, 2 intersections (at the beginning and at the end).

=== Oravský Podzámok – Dolný Kubín north ===
Section R3, which will connect to Dolný Kubín to the expressway network, was to be built in the years 2016 - 2018, early use was planned for 2017. Its total length is 3,226 km. According to plans from 2007, the construction should cost the state budget €27,822,644.9 (SKK 838,185,000). The section will include 3 bridges, the "Dolný Kubín-sever" interchange.

=== Dolný Kubín-north – R3 D1 junction ===
The section Dolný Kubín - intersection D1 is a section connecting the town of Dolný Kubín with the D1 highway. Alternatives for connecting to the highway with connection to MÚK Hubová and MÚK Likavka are currently being assessed. The original variant for Kraľovany was rejected from an environmental point of view. Its length will be 17.8 km. The section is situated at the interface of Orava and Liptov. The section will have 3 level crossings and 2 tunnels near Dolný Kubín with a length of 1569 m and 3004 m.

=== Horna Štubna bypass ===
The construction of the 4.321 km long Horne Štubna section began in December 2008. The construction was financed from the state budget and was made by the companies Strabag, a.s. and Skanska, a.s. Ochvat is located near the junction of the mountain passes Kremnické Bane and Šturec. The route is located in the corridor Zvolen – Diviaky railway line. There are 6 bridges and two level crossings at the end and beginning of the route. The building was ceremonially handed over for use on 23 November 2010 .

=== Zvolen - Šahy ===
The process of assessing the effects of the proposed activity "Expressway R3 Zvolen – Šahy" on the environment was stopped. According to the NDS statement, the preparation of the 6.5 km long Krupina bypass and the 4.8 km long Šahy bypass will continue, for which the NDS will have financial coverage.

== See also ==
- Highways in Slovakia
- Transport in Slovakia
- Controlled-access highway
- Limited-access road

== Resources ==
- https://ww-w.ndsas.sk/narodna-dialnicna-spolocnost
- https://eznamka.sk/sk/
- https://www.emyto.sk/sk
