= Highways in Slovakia =

Highway network in Slovakia (2026)

Highways in Slovakia are divided into motorways (Slovak: diaľnica) and expressways (Slovak: rýchlostná cesta).

The majority of these highways are managed by the state-owned National Motorway Company of Slovakia (NDS), established in 2005. The first modern highway in Slovakia should have been built in the 1930s. The planned motorway would have connected Prague with northern Slovakia. However, the construction of Slovak motorways did not begin until the 1970s.

In 2026, 976 kilometers of expressways and motorways were operational.

== Speed limits ==
Maximum speed (km/h)
Vehicle	Motorways and expressways	Roads for motor vehicles
Private car, motorbike, van up to 3.5 t (does not apply if towing a trailer)	130	90—130
Bus (does not apply if towing a trailer)	100	90
Truck or van over 3.5 t, Vehicle signed as carrying e.g. dangerous, fragile articles; Car, motorbike, van or bus towing a trailer	90	90
Not allowed on motorways: pedestrians, bikes, mopeds, agricultural vehicles. The minimal speed on motorways and expressways is 80 km/h and 60 km/h on roads for motor vehicles unless there are any extraordinary circumstances (e.g., snow, ice, or a car broken down). It is forbidden to stop barring extraordinary situations, or travel backwards. Roads are protected from animals crossing the road.

Speed limits sign in Slovakia

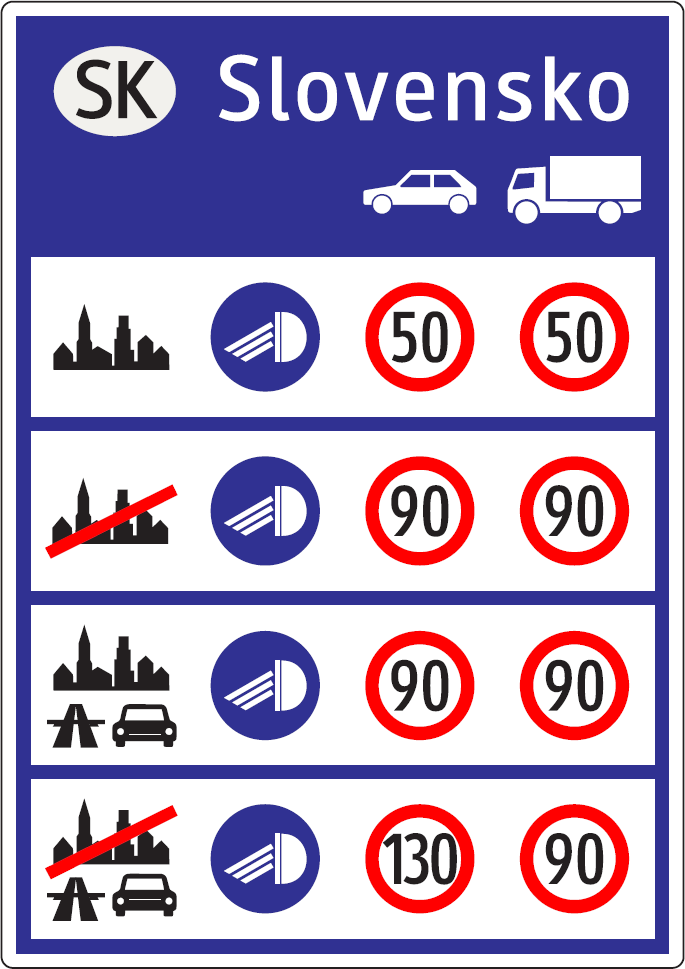
Old speed limit sign that does not apply after 2020.

== History ==
=== Motorways ===
==== Before the Second World War ====
Plan of the motorway network for the First Czechoslovak Republic (1935)

Plan of the motorway network for the Protectorate of Bohemia and Moravia within the Nazi Germany and the Slovak Republic (1939)

Plans of the motorway network for the Czechoslovak Socialist Republic (1963)

The first informal plan for a motorway (first called in Czechoslovak autostráda or dálková cesta) in Czechoslovakia dates back to 1935. This was to link Prague through Slovakia with the easternmost Czechoslovak territory, Carpathian Ruthenia (now Zakarpattia Oblast in Ukraine). The terminus was to be at Velykyy Bychkiv (Velký Bočkov in Czech) on the Romanian border. The definitive route, including a Prague ring motorway, was approved shortly after the Munich Agreement on 4 November 1938, with a planned speed limit of 120 km/h.

The Nazi authorities also made the second Czecho-Slovak Republic, already a German satellite state, build a part of the Reichsautobahn Breslau – Vienna as an extraterritorial German motorway with border checkpoints at each motorway exit. However, only a construction of the route within Bohemia and Moravia was initiated, but never finished. It still sporadically appears in some current Czech motorway plans.

On 1 December 1938 Nazi Germany had already initiated a construction of the so-called Sudetenautobahn (in Sudetenland, before the Munich agreement part of Czechoslovakia, then of Germany) in the route Streitau (Bavaria) – Eger – Karlovy Vary – Lobositz – Böhmisch Leipa – Reichenberg (capital of Sudetenland) – Görlitz (in Prussia, now in Saxony). The autobahn has never been finished, but some remnants in the landscape close to Pomezí nad Ohří, Cheb/Eger and Liberec/Reichenberg are still prominent and an unfinished part from Svárov via Machnín to Chrastava was used in the construction of the I/35 road.

==== Nazi occupation ====
Czechoslovakia was broken up with a declaration of independence by the Slovak Republic and by the short-lived Carpatho-Ukraine which was a prelude to the German occupation of Bohemia and Moravia on 15 March 1939. It was decided to build the motorway only as far as the Slovak border. The technical parameters of motorways (speed limit of 140 – 160 km/h) were adjusted to those of the German Reichsautobahn, as Czech (Bohemian-Moravian) motorways were to be integrated within the German Reichsautobahn network.

The project for the first segment Prague – Lužná was ready in January 1939, and construction in Moravia began on 24 January in Chřiby on the Zástřizly – Lužná segment. The construction in Bohemia from Prague began on 2 May 1939, with a switch to right-hand traffic in Bohemia and Moravia having already gone without a hitch. The motorway should have reached Brno in 1940, but building materials and labour shortages due to an absolute priority given to the Nazi armament industry delayed the work considerably. The construction in the route of approx. 77 km from Prague towards Brno advanced notably, but a prohibition of all civil constructions by the German authorities came into force in 1942.

==== After the Second World War ====
After the Second World War, the completion of only the first and unfinished 77 km of the motorway Prague – Brno as far as Humpolec was approved by the Government in November 1945 and was reinaugurated in 1946. The part-built construction sites of the Sudetenautobahn (28 km) were completely abandoned, as well as that of the Wroclaw – Vienna motorway (84 km). The latter was, however, incorporated in some plans as a future connection motorway between Brno and the D35 motorway. The 77 km of the Prague – Humpolec motorway had been completed except for some large bridges and a concrete surface when the new communist government decided to discontinue the work completely in early 1950.

Only on 8 August 1967 the Government of the Socialist Republic of Czechoslovakia resolved to continue the construction of motorways by adopting a new motorway plan for the whole country and resolved to continue the already twice interrupted construction of the motorway Prague – Brno (number D1) and further Brno – Bratislava (D2). The construction was solemnly inaugurated on 8 September 1967. Due to a change of technical parameters, some bridges finished before 1950 were replaced.

==== 1990–1998 ====
Highway network of Slovakia from 1998

The first post-socialist years were associated with a lack of funds for construction and problems with land settlement and ecological issues. The construction was also not benefited by its politicization. In 1990, the full profile of the section D1 Liptovský Hrádok – Hybe was completed, and a year later it was still possible to construct part of the Trenčín section (Cocholná – Skala), which had prepared documents from the communist era.

In principle, the highway network did not change even after the dissolution of the federation, the highway routes remained unchanged, it was just that the previously planned D18 highway was re-included in it, which, however, no longer headed to Český Těšín, but to the Polish border via Skalité. The stationing and numbering of roads also remained unchanged. The D1 highway near Trenčín, although it was actually at about the 20th kilometre, had a station with values around the 340th kilometre.

Over time, there was also consolidation in the area of highway construction, and in 1994 the construction of the second part of the Trenčín bypass (Skala – Nemšová) began, and in 1996 the missing sections between Horna Streda and Trenčín, the section Nemšová – Ladce, Hybe – Važec and Jarovce – border with Austria. During the government of Vladimír Mečiar, the opening of some (sometimes semi-profile) sections by foreign personalities (Claudia Schiffer or Gérard Depardieu) became known just before the parliamentary elections. By the end of his reign, 31.890 kilometers of full-profile highways were built in Slovakia, and 39.302 km of half-profile highways were also opened.

==== 2006–2010 ====
After the inauguration of the government of Róbert Fico, it was announced that the completion of the D1 highway between Bratislava and Košice, as well as the R1 expressway between Nitra and Banská Bystrica, would be accelerated. In 2007, construction was announced through the so-called PPP projects, although a year before Fico considered them only as a last resort. The missing sections of the mentioned highways were to be built and operated for 30 years by a private individual, to whom the state would repay the costs during the entire period as part of "availability payments". Practically all the missing sections except for the left lane of the Beharovce – Branisko section and the Prešov bypass (both on D1) were divided into so-called three packages. The first included the missing sections on the D1 between Vrútky and Prešov, the second included the sections on the R1 between Nitra and Tekovské Nemce and the northern bypass of Banská Bystrica, and the third formed the southern highway bypass of Žilina together with the route I/64 (the so-called Žilina – Lietavská Lúčka feeder). All public tenders for the concessionaire were accompanied by doubts about the purposeful setting of the conditions, or the dubious exclusion of the participating consortia. In addition to the procurement process, the amount of payments was also criticized. The lack of funds and the weak willingness of the financial markets to lend money for such large-scale projects led to the constant postponement of their financial closure and thus construction. During the first government of Róbert Fico, only the so-called 2nd package.

In addition to PPP projects, the construction of other sections, mainly financed with the help of European funds, was also implemented to a limited extent. This is how the Svidník bypass on the R4, the Figa bypass on the R2, and the Horná Štubna bypass on the R3 were gradually separated. In the years 2007–2010, the long-awaited D1 section across Považská Bystrica was gradually built, thus completing the highway connection between Bratislava and Žilina. For example, the bypass of Trstena on R3 was built from the state budget.

==== 2010 – 2015 ====
In 2011 the R4 between Kosice and border crossing Milhost (SK/H) was under construction making this the 5th expressway in Slovakia to connect to a border crossing (Which was completed in 2013). The R1 between Nitra and Zarnovice was fully complete which made the R1 between Trnava and Banska Bystrica fully complete. The D1 between Turany and Vrutky was complete in 2015 .

==== 2016–present ====
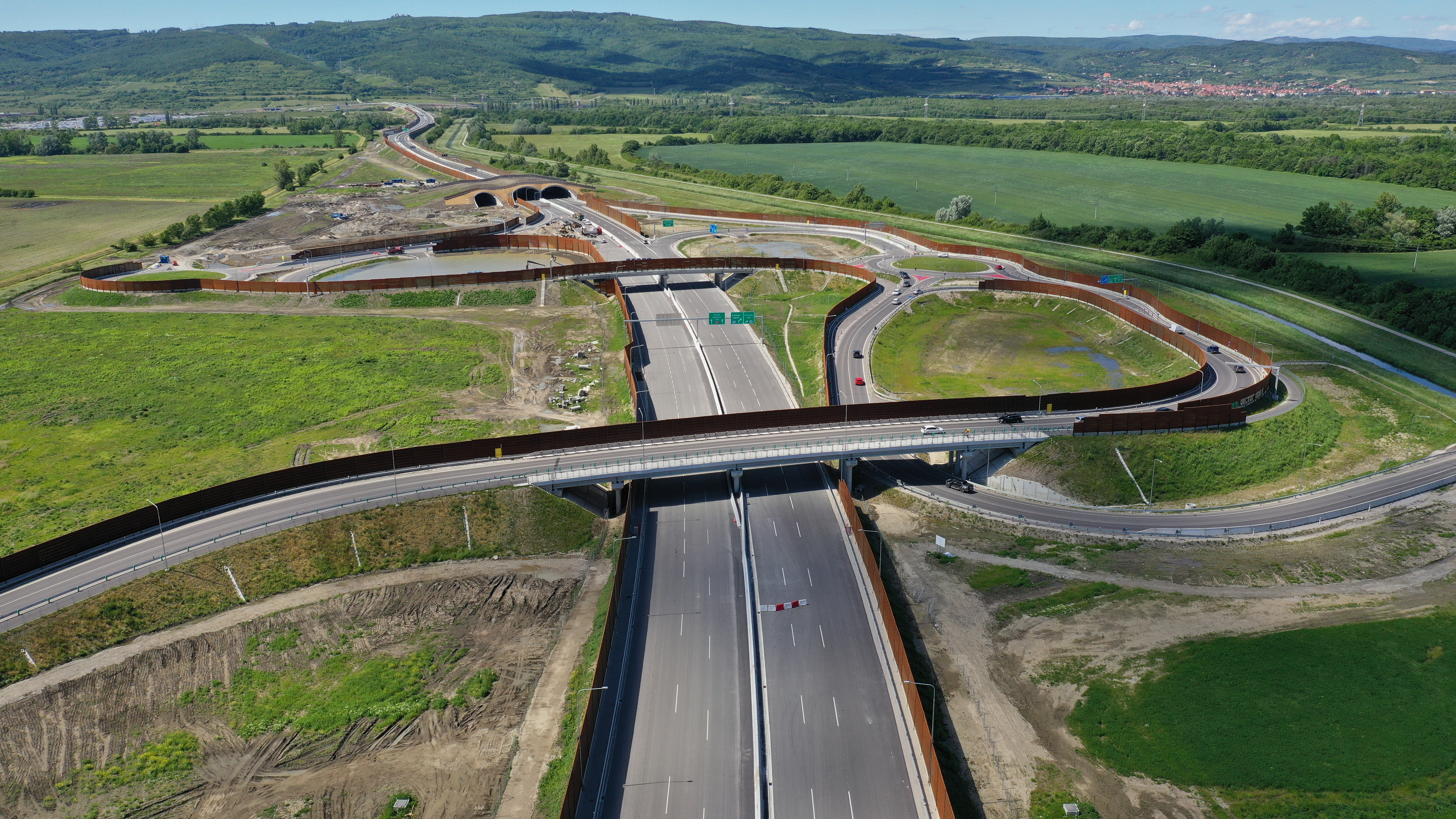
The D4 near Vajnory, Bratislava

In 2016 the D1 between Spišský Štvrtok and Spišské podhradie was opened alongside šibnek tunnel. The R2 between Zvolenská Slatina and Kriváň would open successfully in 2017. After 20 years of construction since 1997, the D3 between Svrčinovec and Skalité border crossing (SK/PL) would finally open, with the second half of the Čadca bypass opening in 2020. In April of 2020, new road rules in Slovakia as well as a redesign of its road signs would classify all full profile expressways starting with an 'R' as a motorway. The D4 Bratislava ring road would open in its full length between Jarovce and Rača throughout 2021 in various stages alongside the R7 between Ružinov and Holice. D1 Prešov bypass opened in 2021 which gave a free flowing motorway connection between Ružomberok and Košice.The southern Košice bypass between the D1 and Valaliky opened in 2025 completing the R4 between the D1 and Hungary. After 27 years of construction since 1998, Višňové tunnel would open to the public on the 22nd of December 2025 marking it as one of Slovakia's longest construction projects. As of 2026, the D1/D4 intersection in Bratislava would be fully complete 5 years after the Southern half of the D4 opened. The remainder of the D3 between Žilina and Čadca is under construction and is expected to be complete by 2029. Once completed, it will be Slovakia's second motorway to be fully completed, (first one being the D2 in 2007) and provide a fully complete motorway connenction for the E75 connecting Hungary and Poland via a full motorway.

New sign for motorways and expressways valid from April 2020

Highways in Slovakia as of 2026

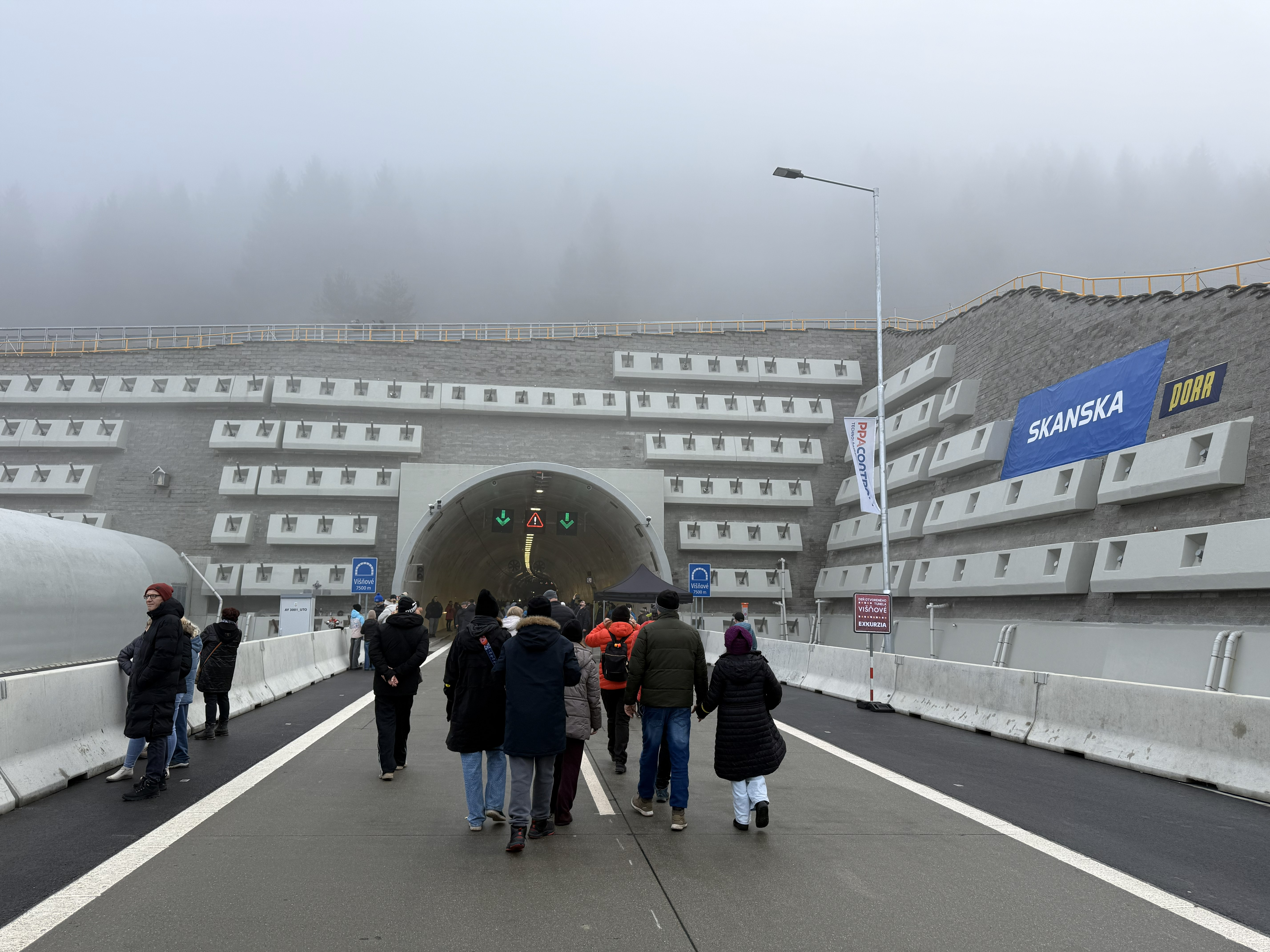
Tunel Višňové during its opening

Motorway number road sign in Slovakia

History of highways in Slovakia

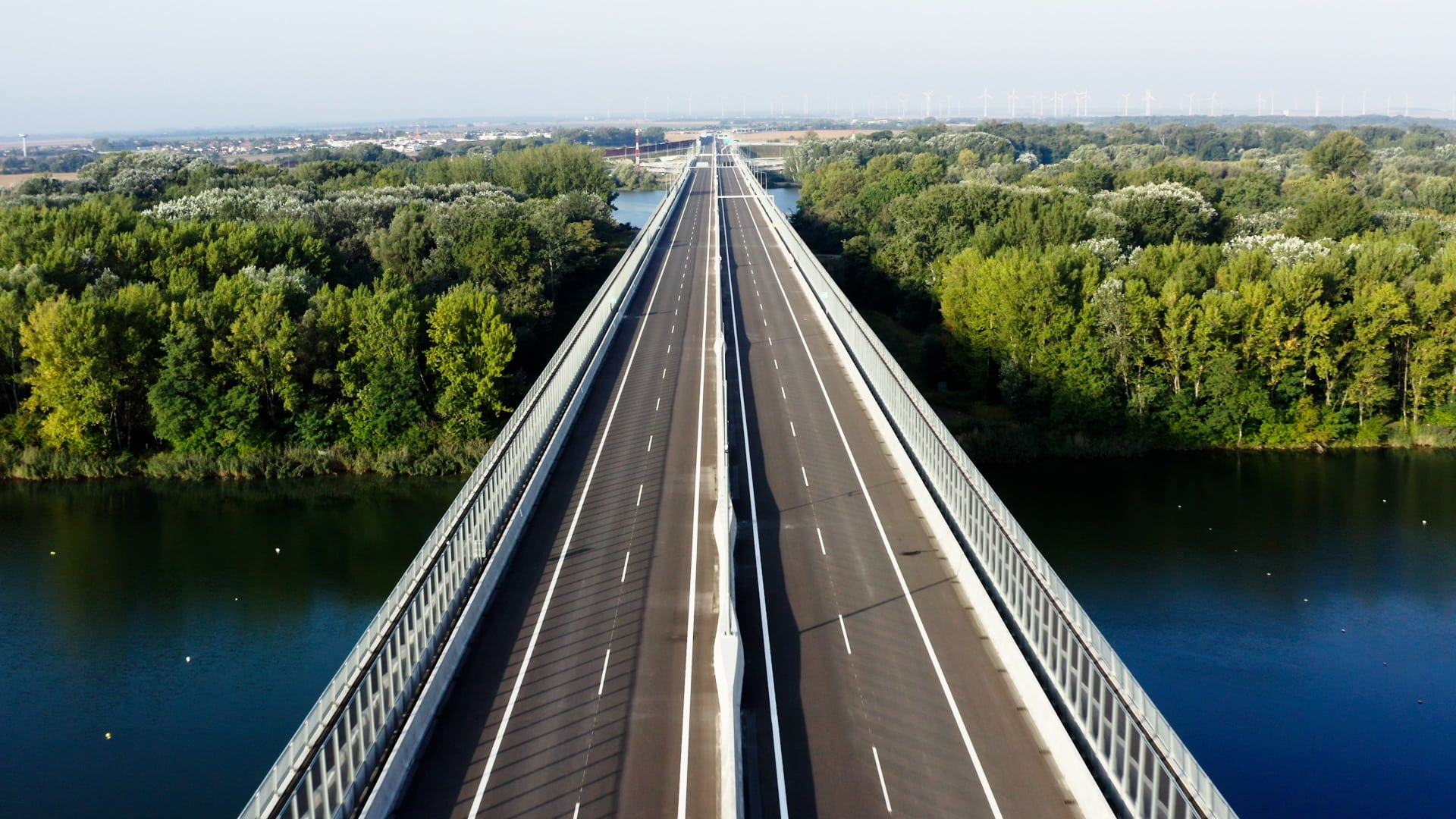
The D4 crossing the Danube river

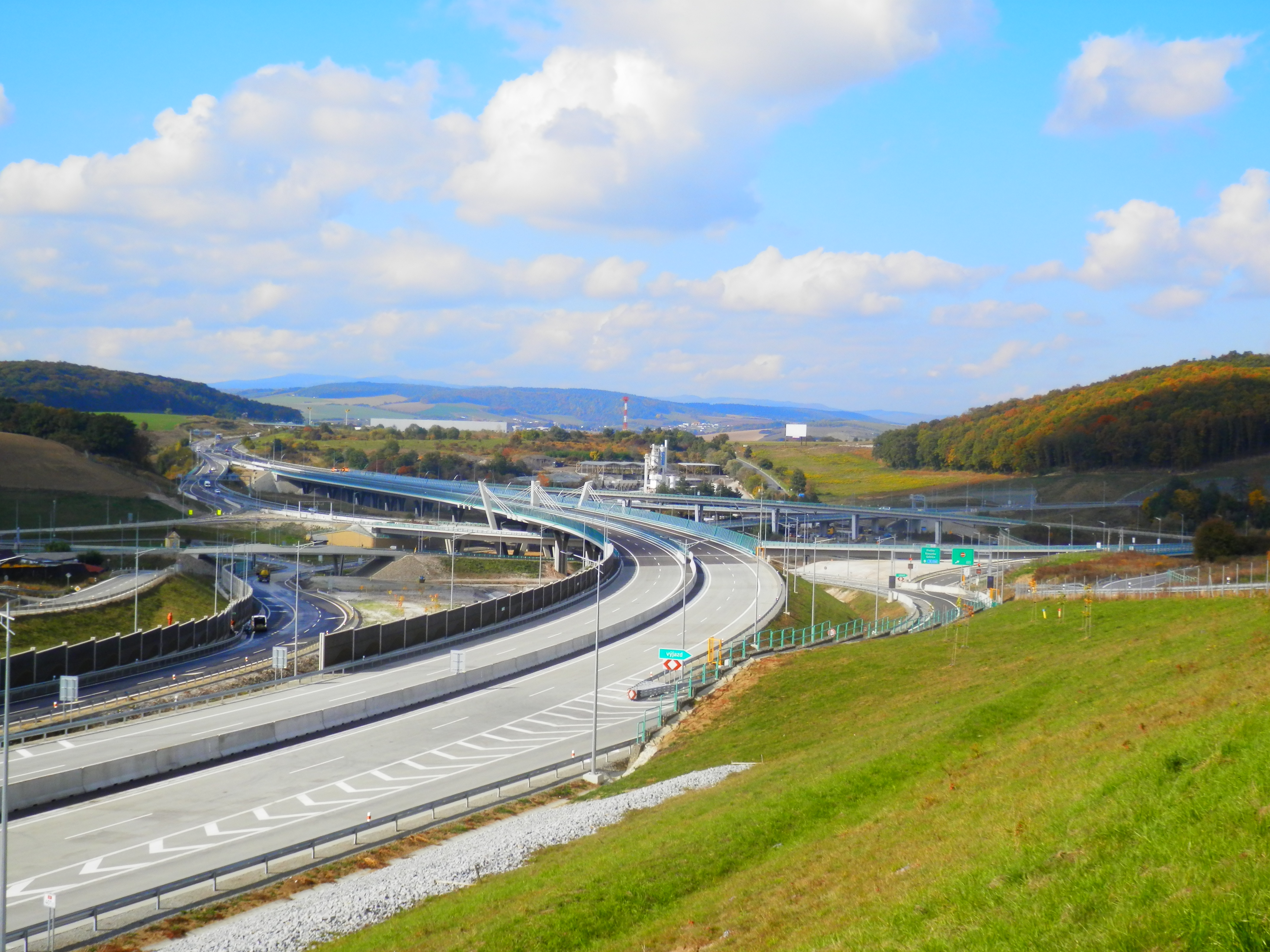
D1 R4 intersection near Prešov

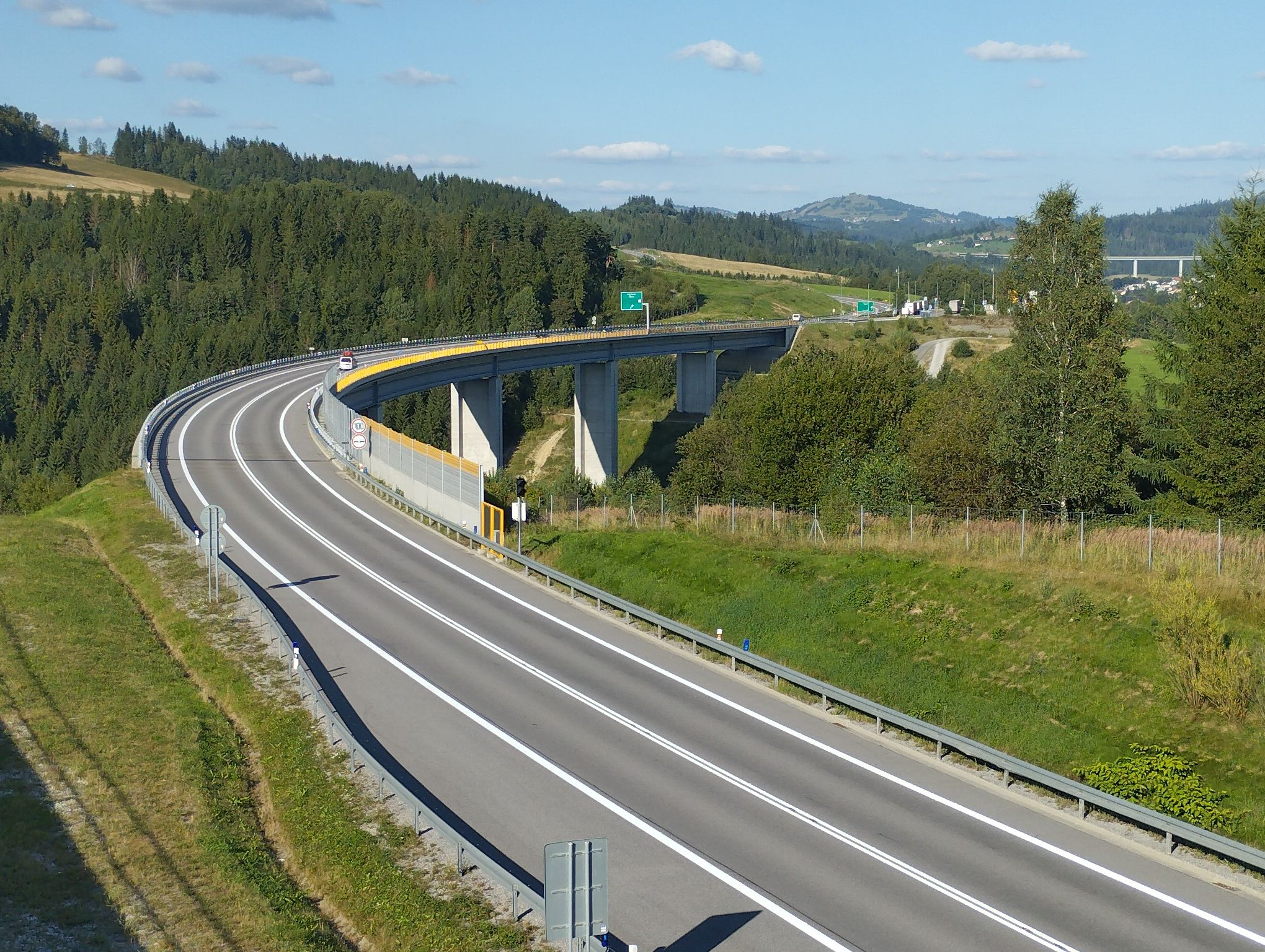
The D3 near Skalité

=== Other highways ===
Until 1938, separate lands of Czechoslovakia have different laws and road systems, inherited from the Austro-Hungarian period. Just in 1938, a unified Czechoslovak road act passed. In 1935, there existed Czechoslovak state roads (not distinguished by class) and several types of non-state public roads:

- in Bohemia, silnice zemské (land roads), silnice okresní (district roads), silnice a cesty obecní (municipal roads and ways) (there was only one remained 23 km land road in Bohemia, connecting Jilemnice, Vysoké nad Jizerou and Rokytnice nad Jizerou)
- in Moravia, silnice okresní (district roads) of 1st and 2nd class, silnice a cesty obecní (municipal roads and ways)
- in Czech Silesia, silnice okresní (district roads) of 1st and 2nd class, silnice a cesty obecní (municipal roads and ways) and veřejné cesty interesentů (public ways of interesents)
- in Slovakia and Zakarpattia, zemské cesty (land roads, formerly župné cesty, župa roads), príjezdné cesty (access roads), vicinální cesty (vicinal roads), cesty obecné (municipal roads and ways) and cesty interesentů (ways of interesents).

Thus, in the Moravian-Silesian Land existed no land roads, in Slovakia and Zakarpattia were no district roads but existed a special class of "access roads", and in Bohemian and Moravia existed not a status of "public ways of interesents".

Historically, local communications is a successor term for the former obecní silnice (municipal roads) and obecní cesty (municipal ways). The terms "utilitarian communications" replaced the former term cesty interesentů or zájemnické cesty (ways of interesents) since 1961. However, in Bohemia and Moravia, public way on a private plot was concepted as a municipal way before the 1961 reform, and maintained by the municipality.

Příjezdní komunikace (access communications) to the railway stations were a special class of roads before 1938 in Slovakia nad Zakarpattia. Since 1938, access communications to railway stations, airports and ports should be built as municipal roads or district roads, as was the previous praxis in Bohemia, Moravia and Silesia. Paradoxically, the today's main access road to the main Prague airport (Václav Havel International Airport in Prague-Ruzyně) is a private property of the airport and has a status of a "utilitarian communication".

Czechoslovak act no. 147/1949 Sb. nationalized all previous státní (state), zemské (land), and okresní (district) roads and authorized the government to list other individual roads (vicinal, municipal and others) to be nationalized) or negotiate a transfer of redundant state roads to administration by municipalities. The Czechoslovak act no. 135/1961 Sb. stated a terminology and classification which is in essence continued in today's Czech Republic and Slovakia.

== Road categories ==
The road hierarchy originates from the Czechoslovak 1961 road act, although there were changes since the dissolution of Czechoslovakia.

=== Motorways ===
Motorways in Slovakia (Slovak: diaľnica, abbr. D) form the trunk of the road network and have at least two separated lanes in each direction, with an emergency lane on each side and auxiliary lanes for entering and leaving the motorway in intersections. The speed limit is 130 km/h (81 mph) with white-on-red highway shield. The road directional signage is white-on-green and red rectangular shields display the motorway number prefixed by the letter D. They have two lanes in each direction or some motorways are 3 or 4 lanes in each direction with smart motorway features. They are owned and maintained by the state and the use of most of their sections is paid via electronic vignettes or toll. Bypasses of large towns and other sections that are used for local traffic tend to be exempt from the vignette requirement.

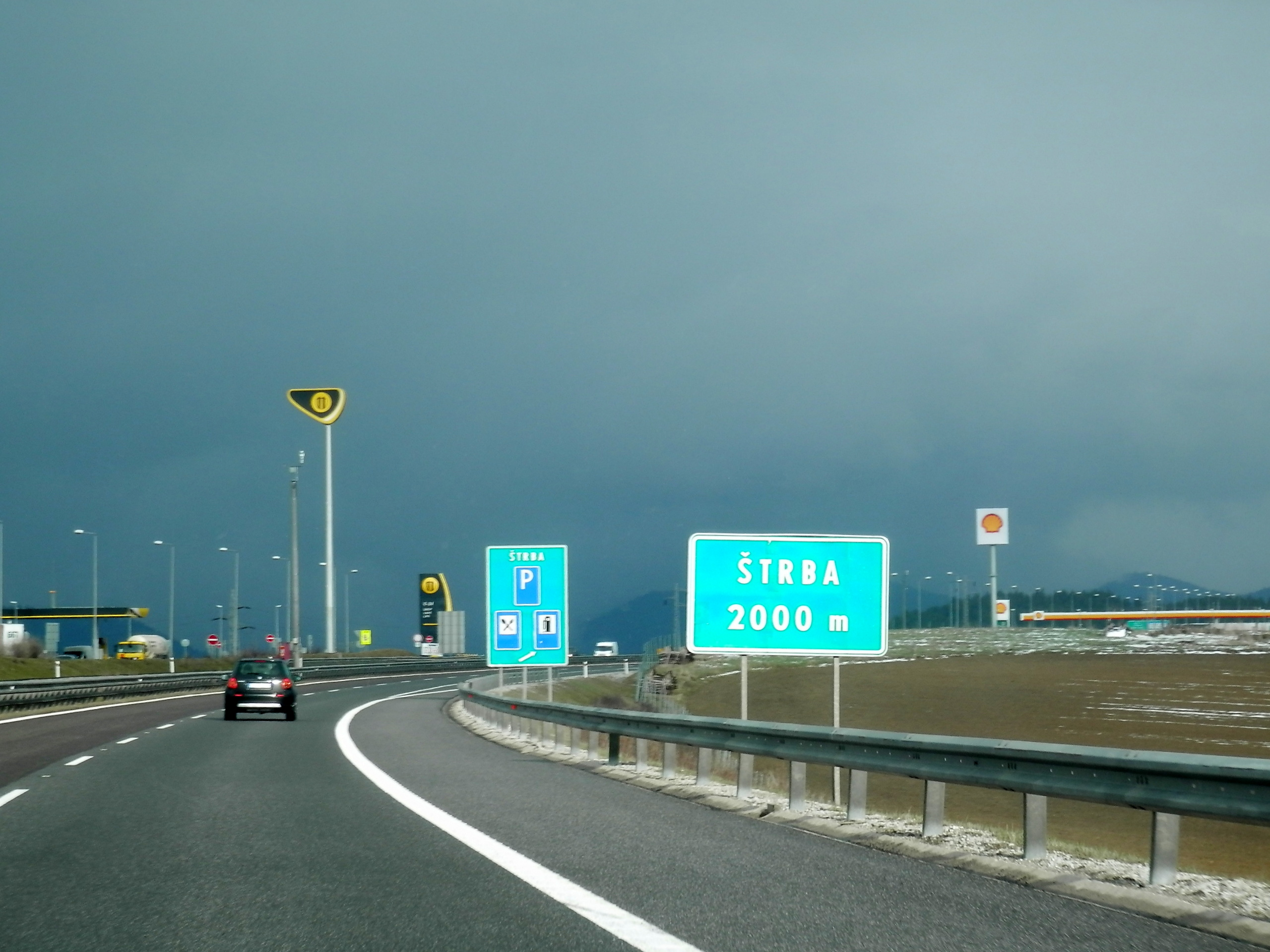
D1 near Štrba

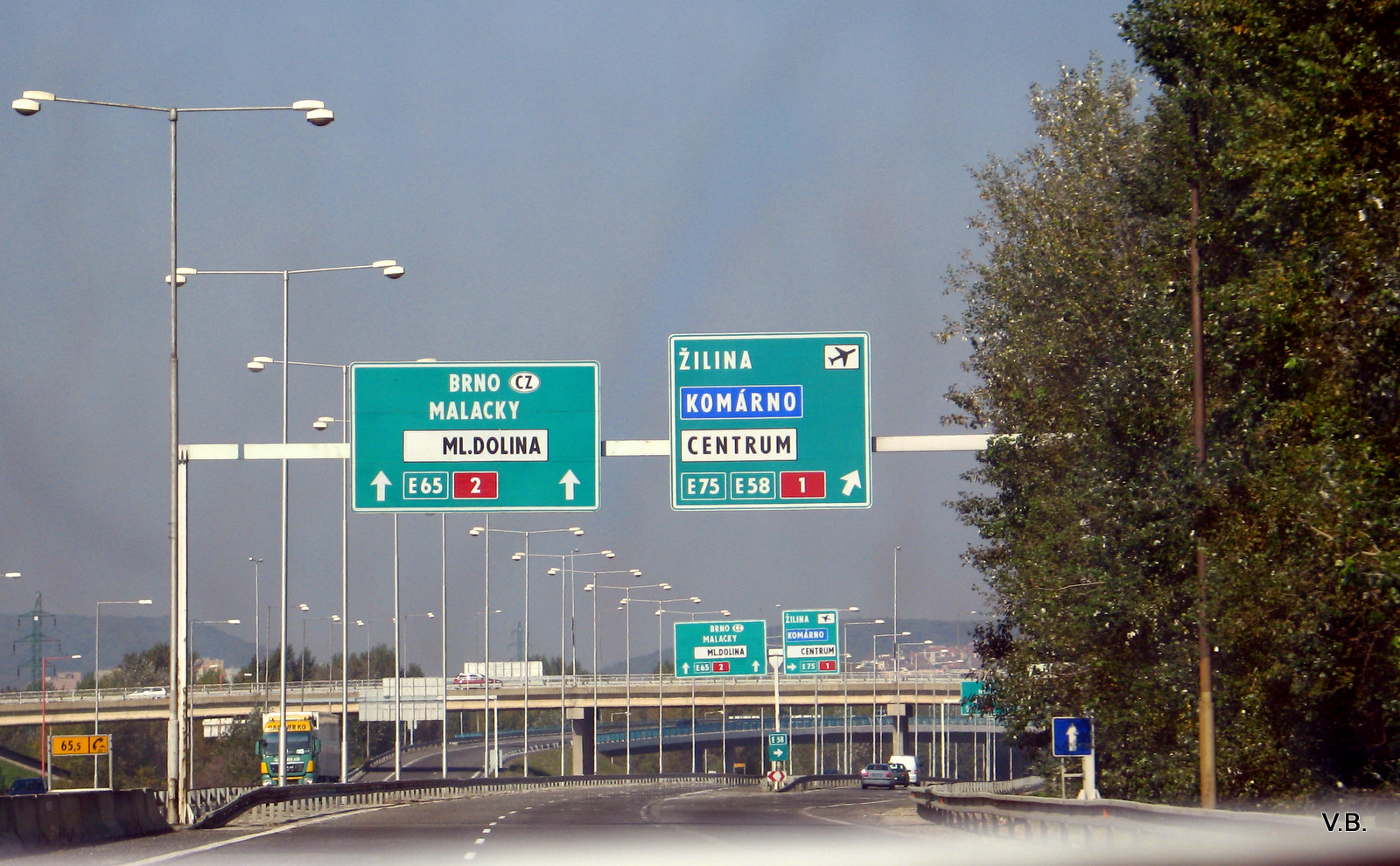
D2 in Bratislava

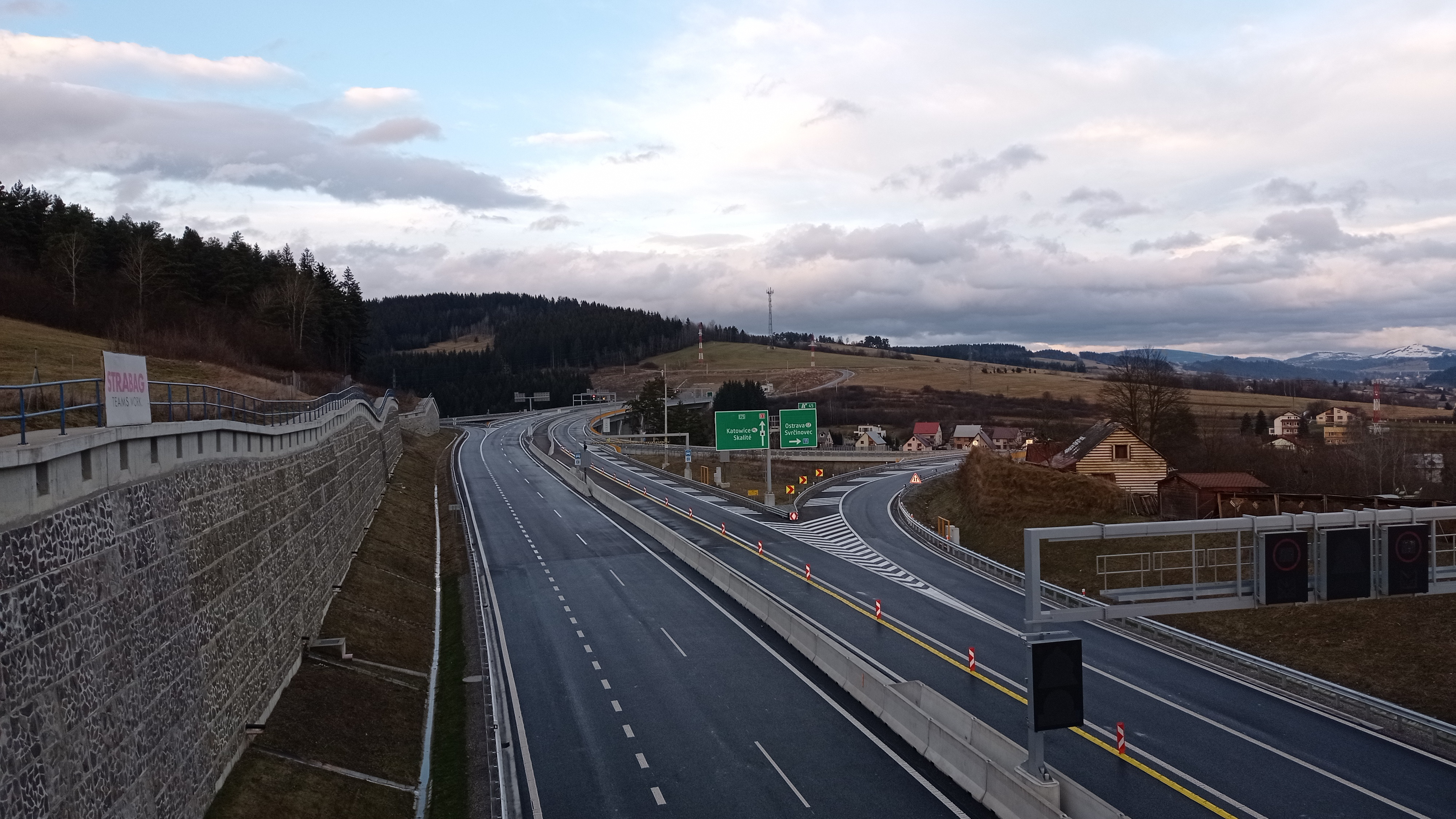
D3 at the Svrčinovec intersection

Sign	E-roads	Route			Total length (km)	In use		Under construction (km)	Map
Sign	E-roads	From	Via	To	Total length (km)	(km)	%	Under construction (km)	Map
D1 motorway (Slovakia)	European route E50 European route E58 European route E75 European route E571	Bratislava	Trnava – Trenčín – Žilina – Prešov – Košice	Záhor (Ukraine)	510.49	410.12	78%	0	
D2 motorway (Slovakia)	European route E58 European route E65 European route E75	Brodské (Czech Republic)	Malacky – Bratislava	Čunovo (Hungary)	80.50	80.50	100%	–	
D3 motorway (Slovakia)	European route E75	Hričovské Podhradie	Žilina – Čadca	Skalité (Poland)	65.58	33.91	52%	31.67	
D4 motorway (Slovakia)	European route E58	Jarovce (Austria)	Bratislava orbital motorway	Devínska Nová Ves (Austria)	48.78	32.79	67%	0	
					705.35	558	77%	31.67	

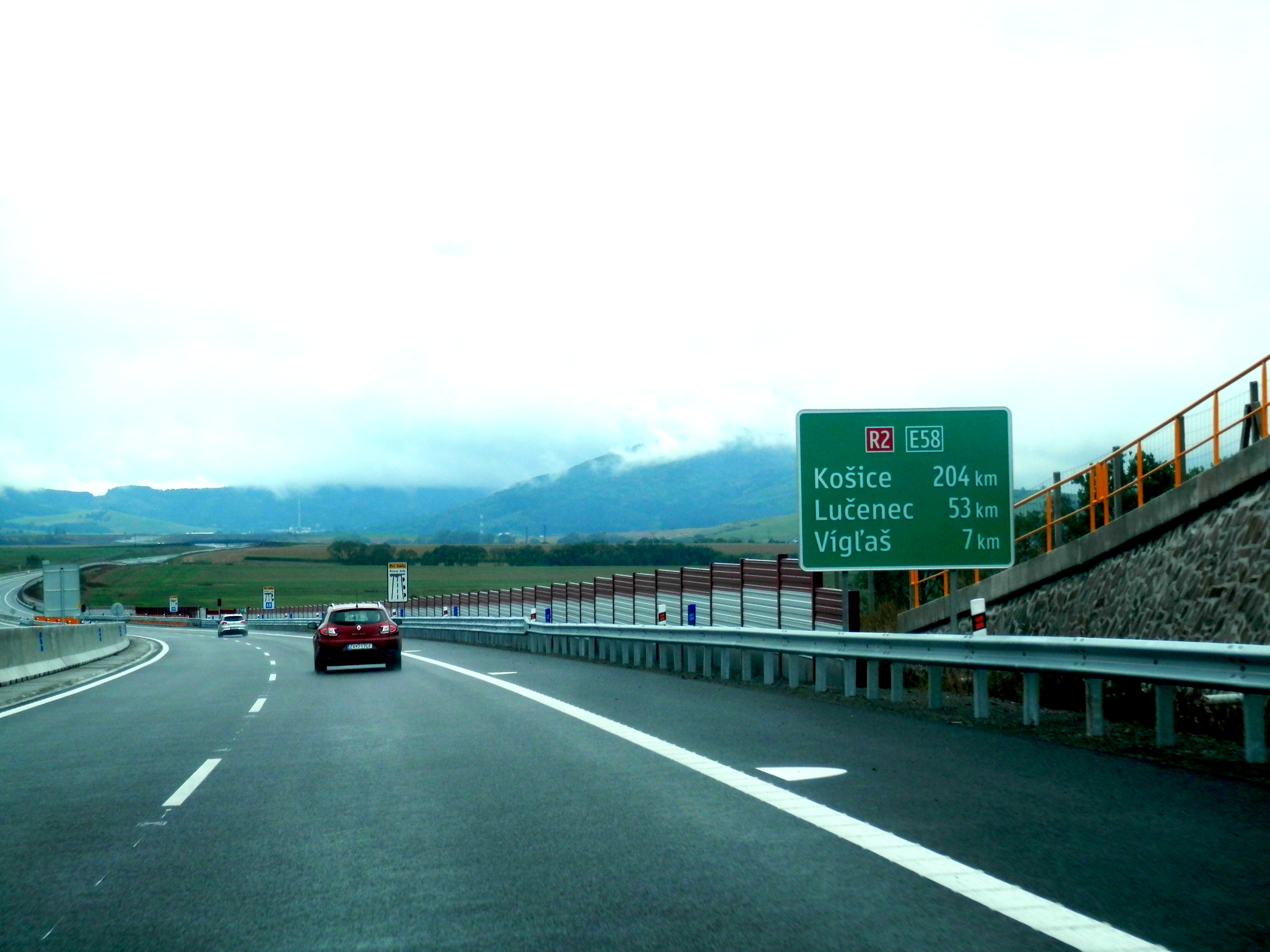
The R2 expressway near Zvolen

=== Expressways ===
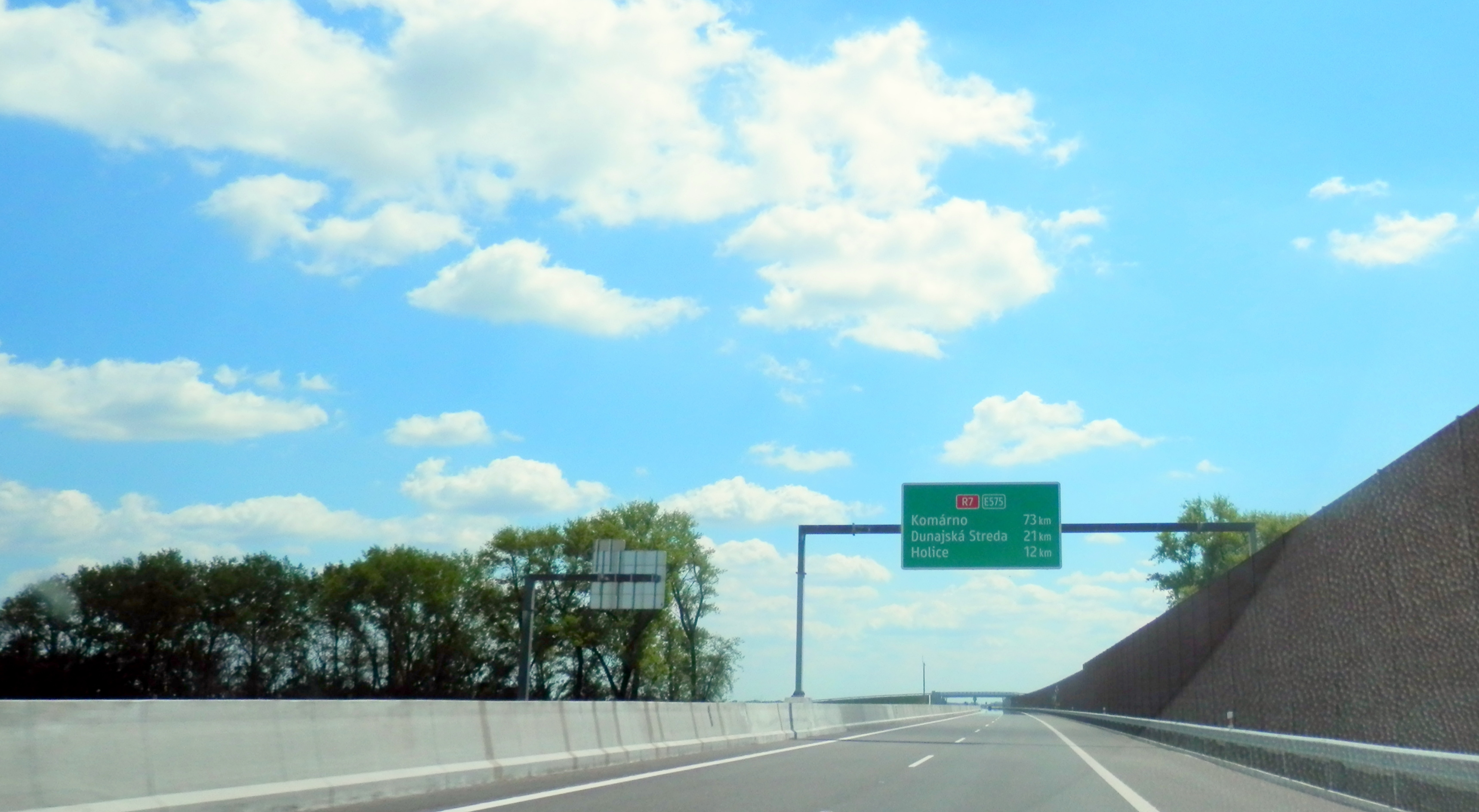
The R7 near Šamorín

Expressway number road sign in Slovakia

Expressways in Slovakia (Slovak: rýchlostná cesta, abbr. R) are dual carriageways with lower standards than those of motorway, but with the same restrictions. Their speed limit is 130 km/h (81 mph) with white-on-red highway shield and they are designated by a number prefixed by the letter R. It has the same white on green road signs as found on motorways, albeit with the different prefix. Expressways have a higher road curve. They have narrower lanes in some places but they can only have 2 lanes in each direction with only a few having 1 lane in each direction with an emergency lane. The term "motor vehicle road" (cesta pre motorové vozidlá) has also been used variably to refer to the network, although this term is now used for a separate category of roads. In 2020, an amendment redefined expressways as a type of motorway, and likewise, they are owned and maintained by the state and the use of most of their sections is paid via electronic vignettes or toll. Bypasses of large towns and other sections that are used for local traffic tend to be exempt from the vignette requirement.

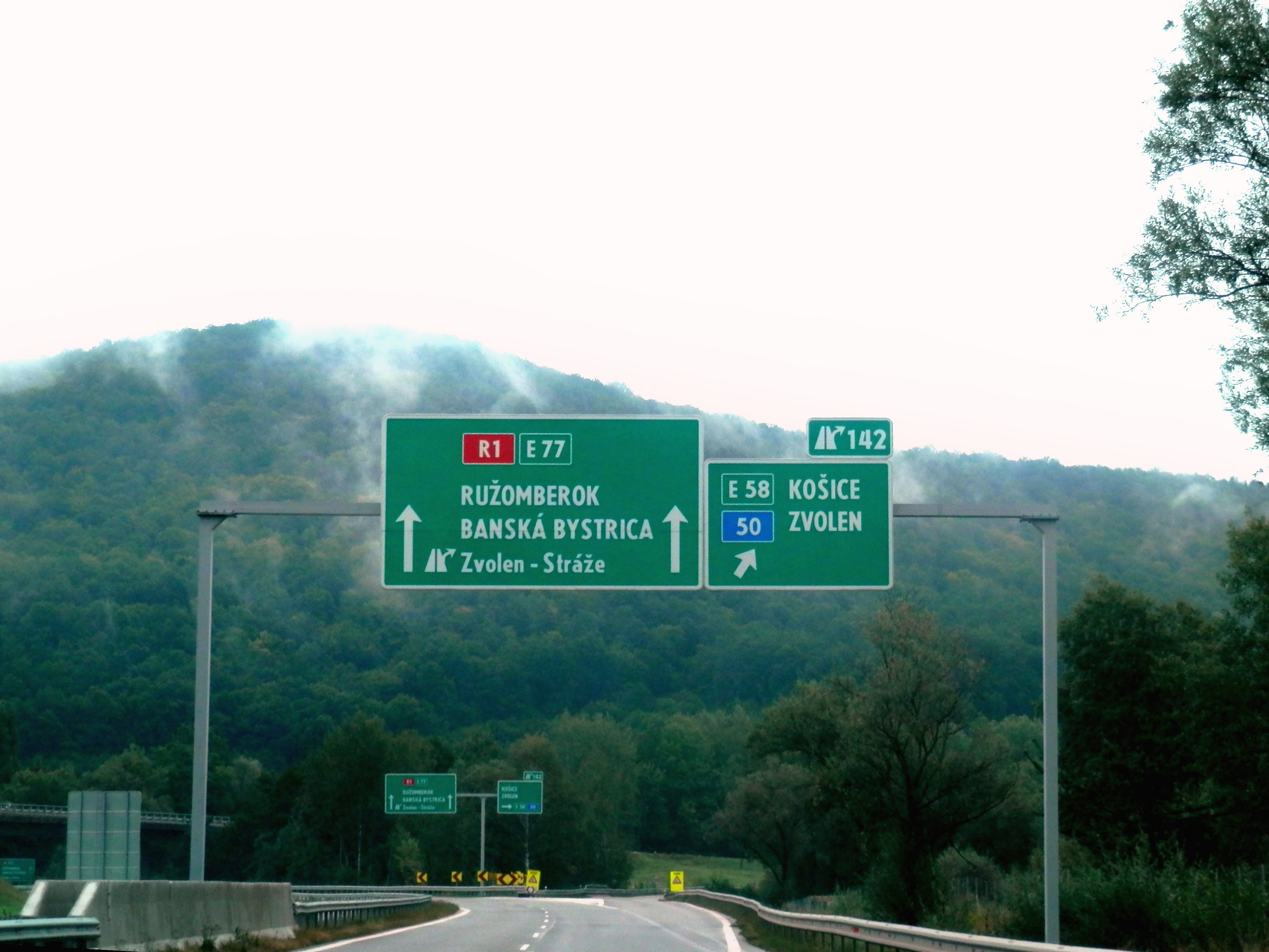
R1 near Zvolen

Sign	E-roads	Route			Total length (km)	In use		Under construction (km)	Map
Sign	E-roads	From	Via	To	Total length (km)	(km)	%	Under construction (km)	Map
R1 expressway (Slovakia)	European route E58 European route E77 European route E571	Trnava	Nitra – Zvolen – Banská Bystrica	Ružomberok	270.94	178.71	66%	3.1	
R2 expressway (Slovakia)	European route E58 European route E77 European route E571 European route E572	Trenčín	Prievidza – Zvolen – Lučenec	Košice	337.28^{[0]}	91.6.^{[0]}	27%	0	
R3 expressway (Slovakia)	European route E58 European route E77 European route E572	Trstená (Poland)	Martin – Žiar nad Hronom	Šahy (Hungary)	184.67^{[0]}	24.2^{[0]}	11%	0	
R4 expressway (Slovakia)	European route E50 European route E58 European route E71 European route E371	Vyšný Komárnik (Poland)	via carpathia Svidník − Prešov – Košice	Milhosť (Hungary)	99.40^{[0]}	23.1^{[0]}	26%	4.3	
R5 expressway (Slovakia)	European route E75	Svrčinovec (Czech Republic)		Svrčinovec	1.71	0	0%	0	
R6 expressway (Slovakia)		Lysá pod Makytou (Czech Republic)	Púchov	Beluša	30.55	7.55	25%	0	
R7 expressway (Slovakia)	European route E575	Bratislava	Dunajská Streda – Nové Zámky – Veľký Krtíš	Lučenec	219.81	32.12	15%	0	
R8 expressway (Slovakia)		Nitra	Topoľčany	Hradište	54.89	0	0%	0	
^{0} length of the expressway is stated without concurrences					1199.25	357.28	26%	7.4	

=== Road network ===
The road network is divided into three classes, which are distinguished by the number of digits in the road number. The class number can be optionally mentioned in written text alongside the road number, separated by a slash. First and second class roads use blue rectangular shields, and the third class roads use a white oval highway shield.

First class roads (cesta I. triedy) are designated by an up to two-digit number and are owned by the state. Road numbers 61 and above run exclusively on Slovak territory under the original Czechoslovak numbering.

Second class roads (cesta II. triedy) are designated by a three-digit number (5xx in Slovakia) and are owned by the regions.

Third class roads (cesta III. triedy) are also owned by the regions. These are designated by a four digit numbering where the first three digits identify the district that the road runs in. Slovakia has started marking these roads' numbers in maps and road signs in 2015.

The general speed limit on highways is 90 kilometers per hour, reduced to 50 km/h in urban areas. A section of a highway can also be signed as a road for motor vehicles (cesta pre motorové vozidlá), which are off-limits for other kinds of traffic.

Sign used for roads for motor vehicles

Road for motor vehicles (Cesta pre motorové vozidlá). These roads are usually dual carriageways with a divider that take the form of a first class road that usually have multi level junctions with some at level junctions. Also some sections of motorways/expressways that are single carriageways (like the R3 in Orava) are signposted as Road for motor vehicles. Speed limits usually range from 90 km/h in a settlement to 130 km/h on some stretches of road, but they are mostly limited to 100 km/h (62 mph). Vehicles that can't reach a minimum speed of 60 km/h (40 mph), bicycles, scooters, pedestrians and horse drawn vehicles are banned on these roads. These roads are usually upgraded from former first class roads or are single carriageway motorways/expressways. They are built to a similar level as a motorway but aren't always required a hard shoulder (except if it's a single carriageway motorway which always requires a hard shoulder) and the lanes are narrower then on a motorway and the roads have a sharper turning curve than a motorway.

=== Local roads ===
Local roads (miestna cesta) are public roads that serve local traffic and are not already part of a highway or a motorway. They are owned and maintained by municipalities. Similarly to highways, they are divided into four classes according to their importance, where the first class includes the most important collector roads in cities, while the fourth class includes walk paths and bike roads that are off-limits to automobiles. The Road Act also allows for so-called "express local roads" to be built up to expressway standards to accommodate for fast motor traffic.

=== Utilitarian roads ===
Utilitarian roads (účelová komunikácia) can be owned by any subject, private as well as public. Such roads are often subject of litigations because the legal status is a bit inconsistent and unclear.

- Publicly accessible utilitarian roads have similar traffic mode as local roads; generally, forest roads and field roads are count among "utilitarian/purpose roads". However, motor vehicles are prohibited at the forest roads by the Forest Act. The national law doesn't concern over compensations or subventions to the owner, and the duty of maintenance is questionable and not stated explicitly by the law.
- Closed utilitarian roads tend to be located in enclosed objects or facility; outside of them, the owner needs an administrative decision to exclude or restrict the public traffic. Traffic rules applies to such communications, but the owner can permit exceptions.

== Toll requirements ==
A Slovak electronic motorway vignette is required for all motorized vehicles in order to use tolled sections of motorways and expressways in Slovakia. Motorized vehicles (Note: Including vehicles with a trailer) up to 3.5 tonnes need to buy a single vignette which costs 8,10€ for 1 day, 10,80€ for 10 days, 17,10€ for 30 days and 90€ for 365 days. Vehicles with a trailer whose total weight exceeds 3.5 tonnes need to buy two vignettes. ANPR cameras are stationed across the tolled sections to verify the validity of vignettes and the police have the ability to pull a driver over and request proof of purchase. Entering the tolled sections without a valid vignette will result in a fine of 150€. However, if a tolled section is entered but a vignette is purchased before the end of the day, no fine will be issued.

Lorries have to buy an e-myto via the e-myto website to use the motorways and expressways. There are different fares for lorries below 3.5 tonnes and lorries above 3.5 tonnes.

While the majority of motorways and expressways are subject to the vignette requirement, there are specified sections that have been temporarily or permanently exempted from the toll network. These sections are usually bypasses of towns or located within major cities such as Bratislava and Banská Bystrica. As of 2026, there are 143 kilometers of motorways/expressways that are toll-free.

A road sign indicating a motorway/an expressway section not subject to the vignette requirement. This sign is always located at entrances to toll-free sections.

A road sign indicating a motorway/an expressway section subject to the vignette requirement.

== See also ==
- Transport in Slovakia
- List of controlled-access highway systems
- Evolution of motorway construction in European nations
