= Transport in Slovakia =

Transport in Slovakia is possible by rail, road, air, or rivers. Slovakia is a developed Central European country with a well-developed rail network (3,662 km) and a highway system (854 km). The main international airport is the M. R. Štefánik Airport in the capital, Bratislava. The most important waterway is the river Danube, which is used by passenger, cargo, and freight ships. The two most important harbours in Slovakia are Komarno harbour and Bratislava harbour.

== Railways ==
Railway network in Slovakia (2026)

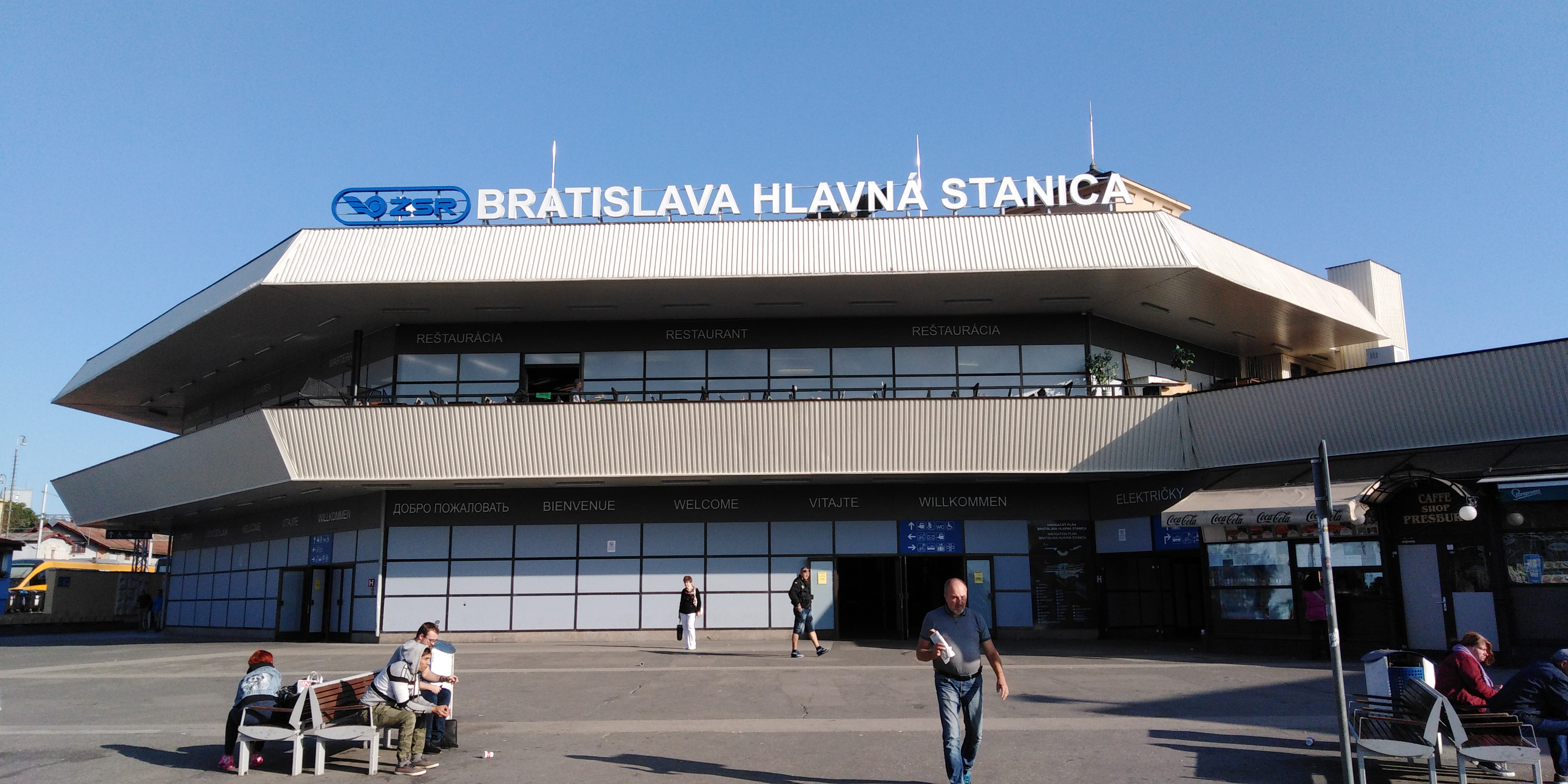
Bratislava main railway station

- Total: 3,662 km (2008)
  - Broad gauge: 99 km of 1,520 mm (4 ft 11 27/32 in) gauge - used for freight transport only, see Uzhhorod - Košice broad gauge track
  - Standard gauge: 3,473 km of 1,435 mm (4 ft 8 1/2 in) gauge (1,588 km electrified; 1,011 km double track)
  - Narrow gauge: 50 km (45 km of 1,000 mm (3 ft 3 3/8 in) gauge; 5 km of 760 mm (2 ft 5 15/16 in) gauge)

Slovakia has a range of railway connections that provide access to all of Slovakia in the country and from the rest of Europe. There are many railway operators that control railways across the country, with the main railway operator being ZSSK. The railway network is very dense in the western and eastern parts of Slovakia but is less accessible in central Slovakia. The singular high-speed rail line in Slovakia is the Rychlik between Bratislava and Kosice (Via Zillina). The top speed of the line is 200 km/h (120 mph). The Rychlik was established in 2002 after ZSSK took over ZSR. Most of the country's railways run on Tas REX (Regional Express) which operates at speeds between 140 and 160 km/h (87 and 99 mph).

=== Train operators ===
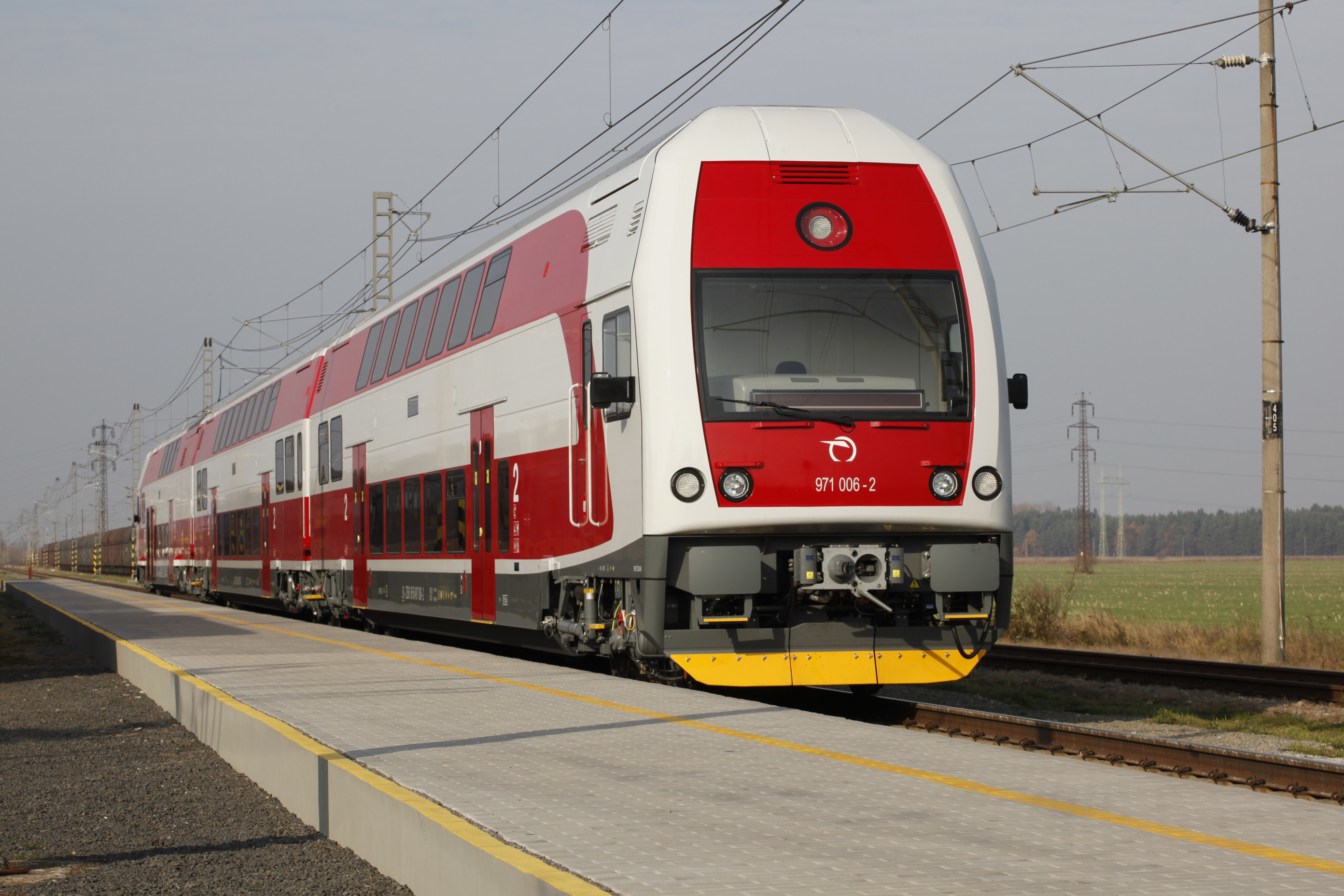
A train of Železničná spoločnosť Slovensko

Passenger

Company	Types of train transport
ZSSK	High-speed trains Regional express trains
Leo Express	Intercity trains
RegioJet	Intercity trains
Railjet (ÖBB)	High-speed trains

Cargo

The main cargo train operator for the cargo freight rail in Slovakia is ZSSK cargo.

== Roads ==
Highway network in Slovakia (2023)

- Total: 43,761 km
- Paved: 38,085 km (including 384 km of express-ways)
- Unpaved: 5,676 km

Slovakia has a total of 43,761 km of roads in the country with 3,336.6 km being main or national roads, 13,958.7 km being secondary and regional roads, and 861.2 km (535.1 mi) being highways, with the rest being other types of roads.

=== Highways ===
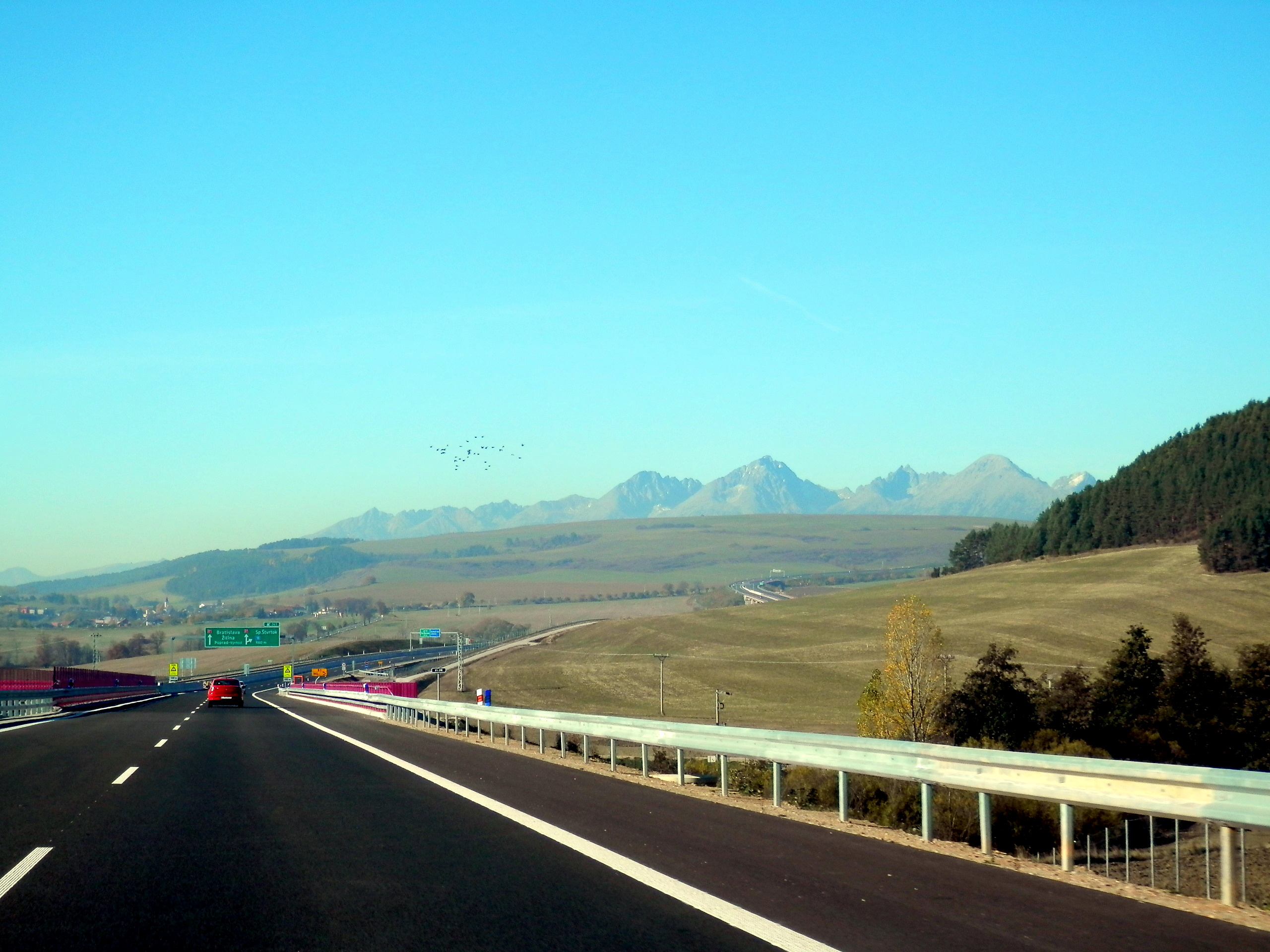
Highway D1

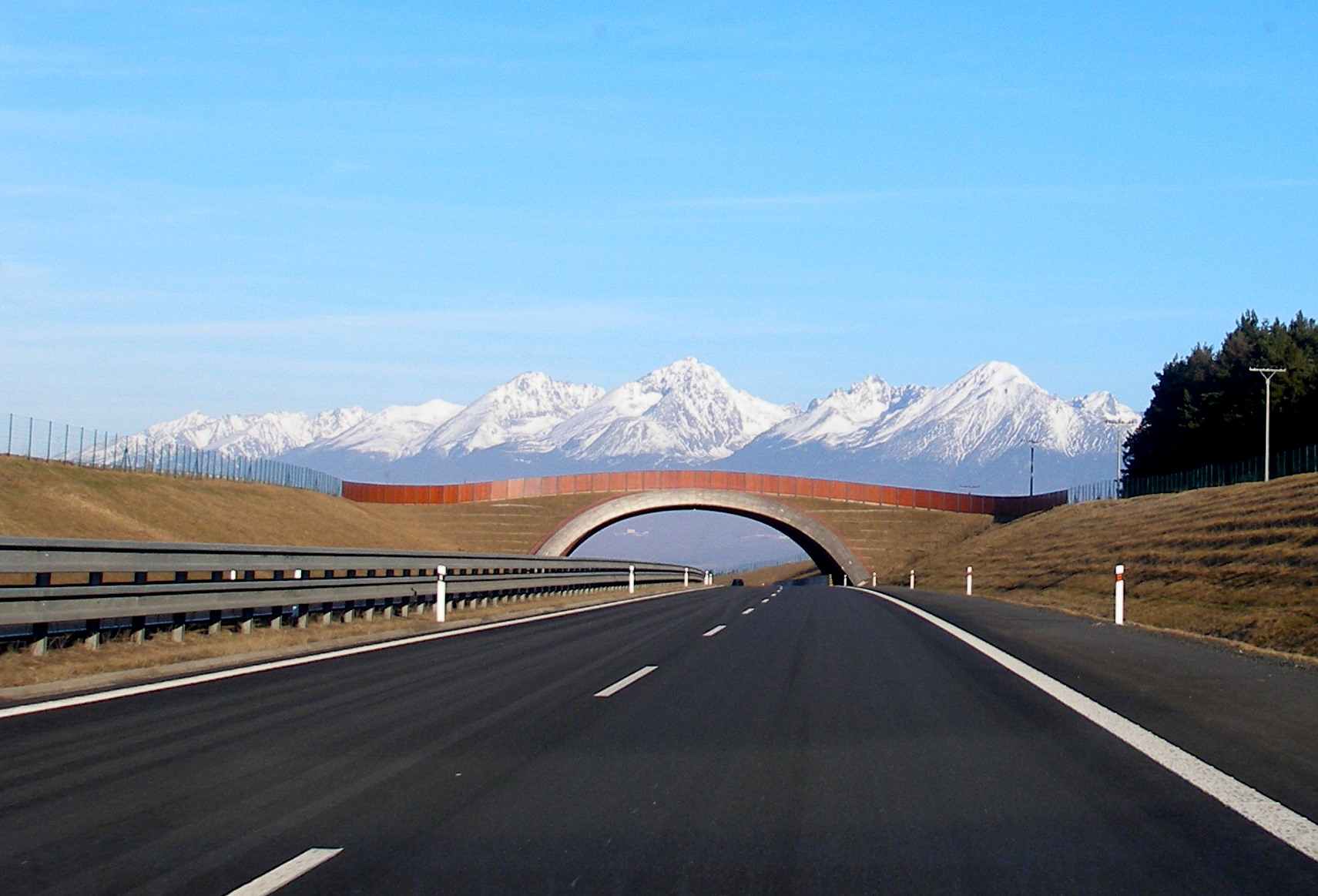
D1 motorway

Motorways in Slovakia 543 km (337 mi) (2022)

- D1: Bratislava - Trnava - Trenčín - Považská Bystrica - Žilina, Liptovský Mikuláš - Jánovce, Prešov - Košice - Záhor(SK/UA border)
- D2: Kúty (CZ/SK border) - Malacky - Bratislava - Jarovce (SK/H border)
- D3: Dolný Hričov - Žilina - Čadca - Skalité(SK/PL border)
- D4: Bratislava orbital motorway - Jarovce - (SK/A border)

Expressways in Slovakia 311 km (193 mi)

- R1: Trnava - Nitra - Zvolen - Banská Bystrica
- R2: (SK/CZ border) - Trenčín - Prievidza - Zvolen - Rimavská Sobota - Košice
- R3: (SK/H border) - Zvolen - Martin - (SK/PL border)
- R4: (SK/H border) - Košice - Prešov - Svidník - (SK/PL border)
- R5: Svrčinovec - (SK/CZ border)
- R6: Beluša - Púchov - (SK/CZ border)
- R7: Bratislava - Nové Zámky - Krupina - Lučenec
- R8: Nitra - Topoľčany - Bánovce nad Bebravou

== Airports ==
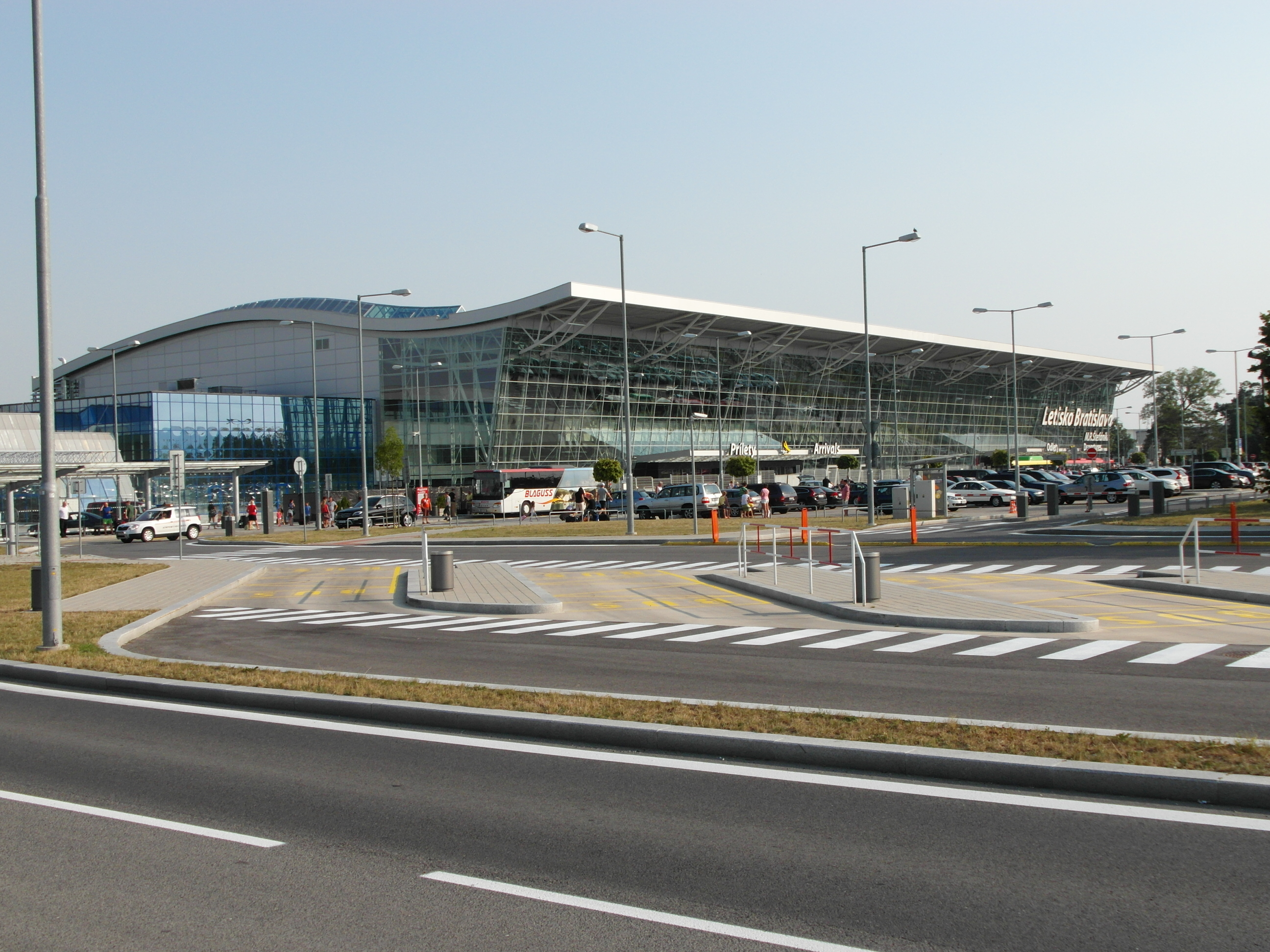
Bratislava Airport

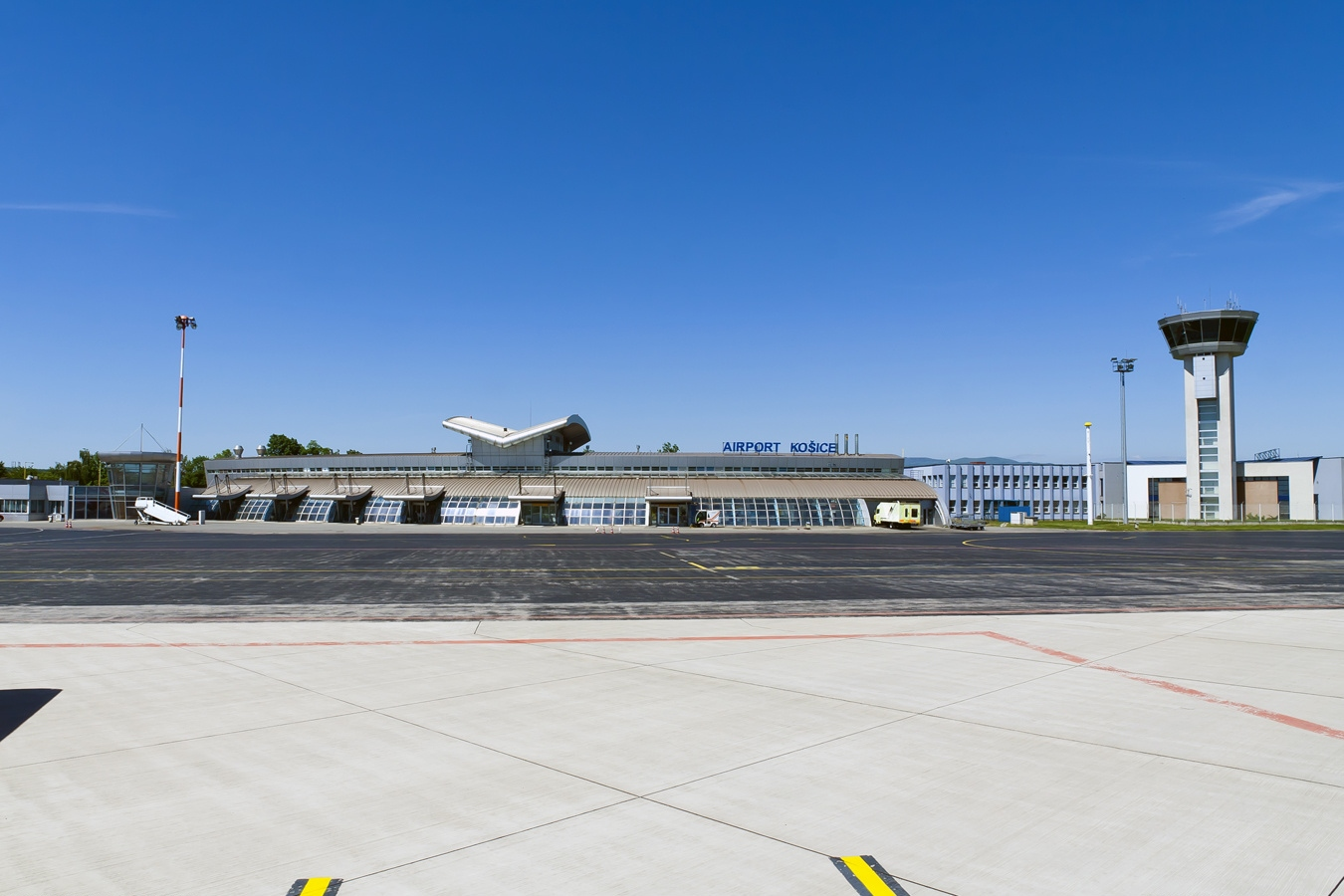
Košice International Airport

Slovakia has three international airports. Bratislava Airport is the main and largest international airport. It is located nine kilometres (5 1/2 miles) northeast of the city centre. It serves civil and governmental, scheduled and unscheduled domestic and international flights. The current runways support the landing of all common types of aircraft currently used. The airport has enjoyed rapidly growing passenger traffic in recent years; it served 279,028 passengers in 2000 and 2,292,712 in 2018.

Košice International Airport is an airport serving Košice. It is the second-largest international airport in Slovakia.

The Poprad–Tatry Airport is the third busiest airport, the airport is located 5 km west-northwest of Poprad. It is an airport with one of the highest elevations in Central Europe, at 718 m, which is 150 m higher than Innsbruck Airport in Austria.

== Ports and harbours ==
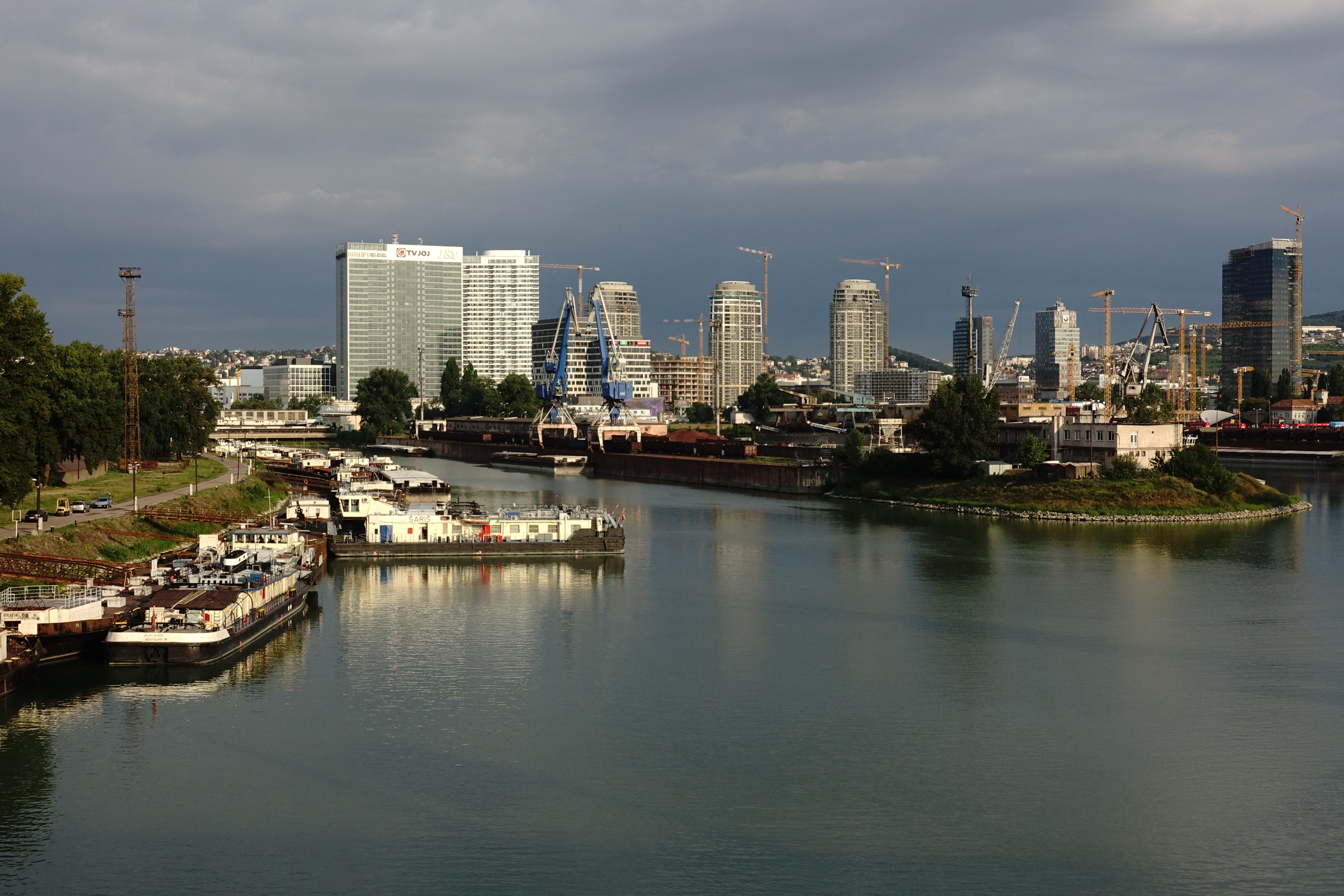
Port of Bratislava

- Port of Bratislava
- Port of Komárno

== Waterways ==
- The Danube waterway is 172 km and is used by passenger, cargo, and freight ships of nearly all sizes.

== Pipelines ==
- Petroleum products 416 km; natural gas 6,769 km (2010)
- Gas pipelines 162 km Poland Slovakia interconnector
- Crude oil 19 km Druzhba pipeline

== Public transport ==
=== Buses and trolleybuses ===
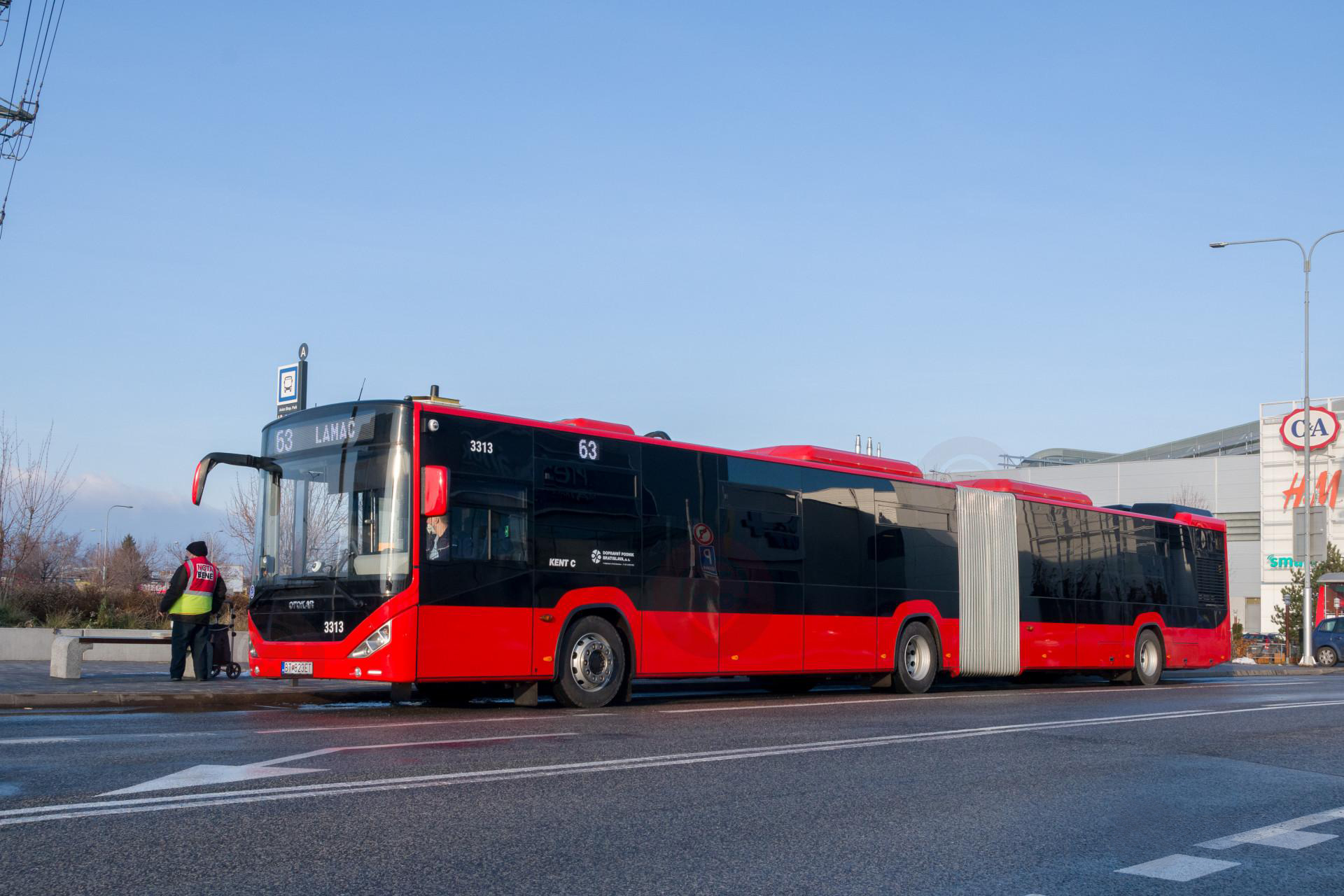
City bus in Bratislava

Most towns and cities in Slovakia have well-developed bus networks. Most of the buses are operated by the city or town council but most regional buses are operated by private operators with the permission of local authorities and/or the county council. There is also a trolleybus system which only operates in large cities and is operated by the town council. They are more of an ecological system of transport than a standard bus.

=== Tram ===

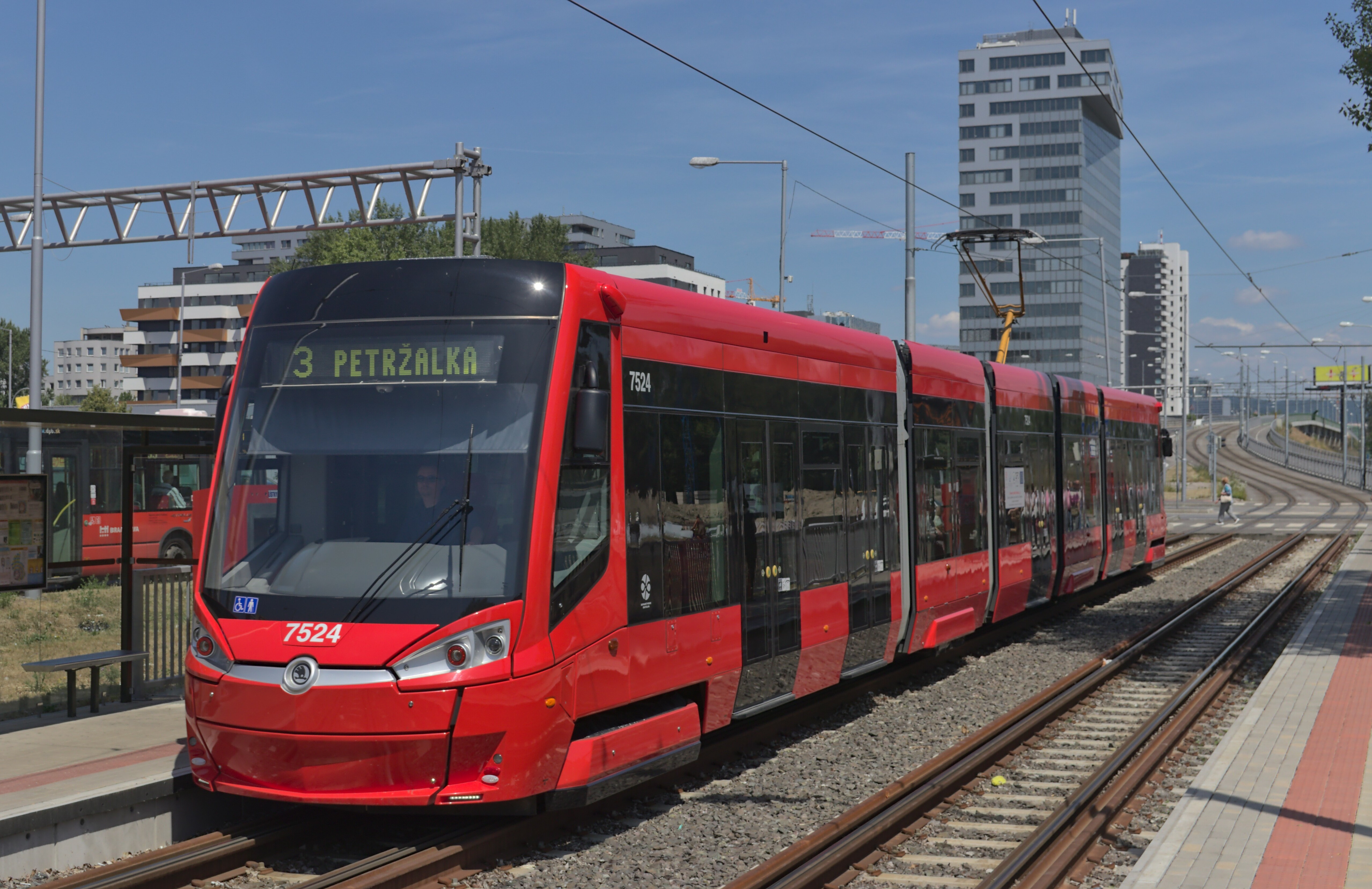
Škoda 30 T tram in Bratislava

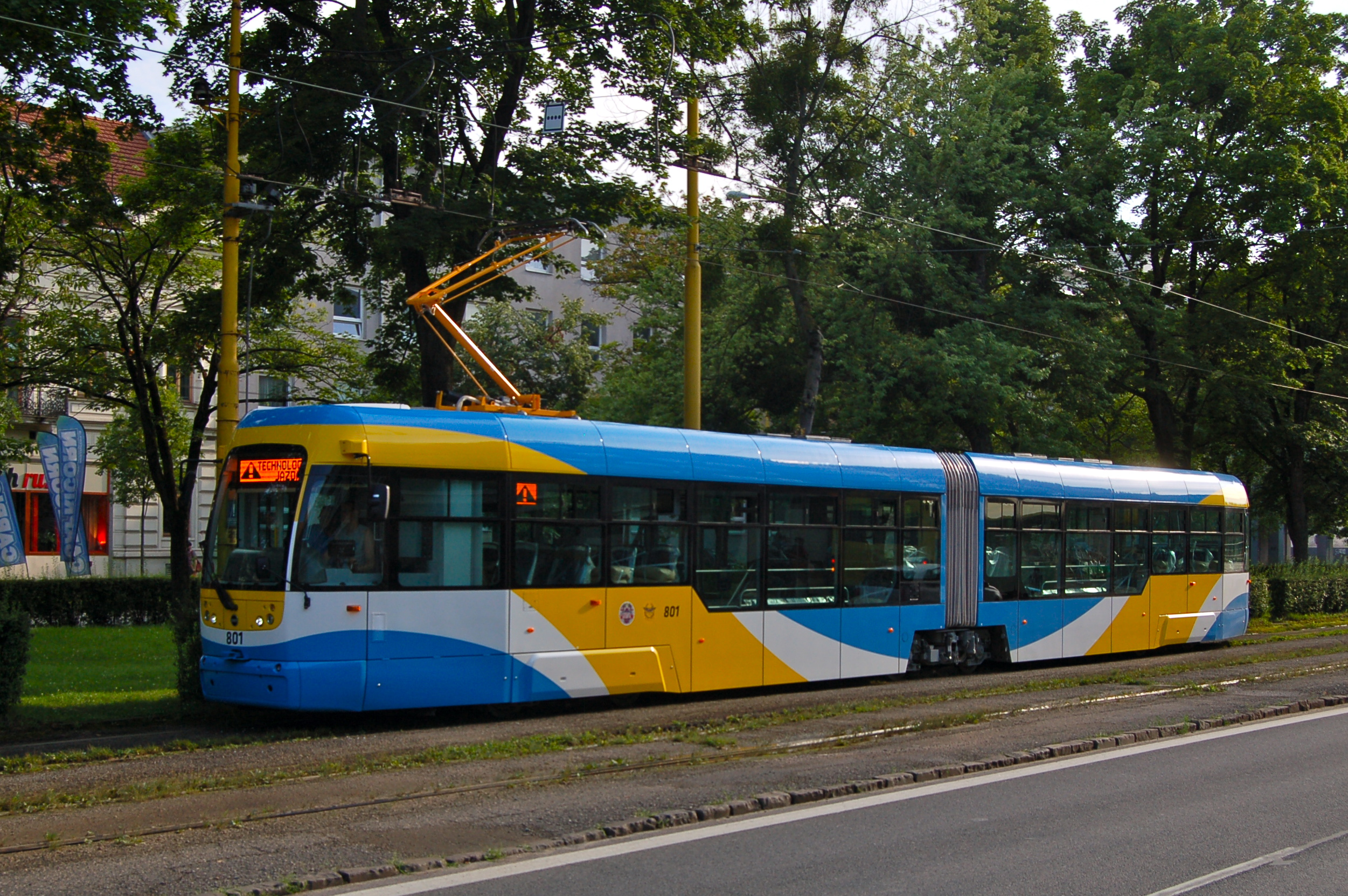
Vario LF2 tram in Košice

Trams are only found in Bratislava and Košice. The first tram to arrive in Slovakia was in 1895 in Bratislava and then later on in 1913 trams arrived in Košice. Today the tram network is expanding rapidly in both cities.

== See also ==
- Slovakia
- Rail transport in Slovakia
- Highways in Slovakia
- List of airports in Slovakia
