= Speed limits in Slovakia =

Speed limits in Slovakia vary by type of vehicle. The common national speed limits are 50 km/h (31 mph) in built-up areas, 90 km/h (56 mph) on country roads that are not in a settlement, and 130 km/h (81 mph) on motorways. From 2020, all expressways that have an R (rýchlostná cesta) number are considered as a motorway. Amendment No. 455/2021, which came into force on July 6, 2022, abolished the speed limit of 90 km/h (56 mph) on motorways in built-up areas. Trucks whose total weight exceeds 7.5 tonnes are disallowed to overtake other vehicles on the motorways. Since February 1, 2009, all types of vehicles have been required to use headlights all the time.

National speed limits sign in Slovakia

== Current speed limits ==
National speed limits by vehicle type and road type as of September 1, 2026.
	Pedestrian zones	Residential and school zones	Built-up areas	Roads outside built-up areas	Motorways
Motor vehicles with a maximum permissible total weight not exceeding 3500 kg (without trailer or with a trailer with a maximum permissible total weight not exceeding 750 kg)	10 km/h (6.2 mph)	20 km/h (12 mph)	50 km/h (31 mph)	90 km/h (56 mph)	130 km/h (81 mph)
Buses (without trailer or with a trailer with a maximum permissible total weight not exceeding 750 kg)	10 km/h (6.2 mph)	20 km/h (12 mph)	50 km/h (31 mph)	90 km/h (56 mph)	100 km/h (62 mph)
Other motor vehicles	10 km/h (6.2 mph)	20 km/h (12 mph)	50 km/h (31 mph)	90 km/h (56 mph)	90 km/h (56 mph)
Vehicles (including buses) with a trailer with a maximum permissible total weight over 750 kg	10 km/h (6.2 mph)	20 km/h (12 mph)	50 km/h (31 mph)	90 km/h (56 mph)	90 km/h (56 mph)

== Minimum speed limits ==
Vehicles incapable of achieving 80 km/h (50 mph) are forbidden from entering motorways. On roads for motor vehicles, the minimum speed limit is set to 60 km/h (37 mph) and vehicles that are unable to reach the limit are prohibited. There is no specified minimum speed limit on roads within and outside built-up areas.

== Enforcement ==
Speed limits are predominantly enforced by mobile speed cameras found in law enforcement vehicles. While Act No. 8/2009 does not specify any tolerance for exceeding the speed limits, the mobile speed cameras have a tolerance of 3 km/h up to 100 km/h and 3% over 100 km/h. As of 2026, there are no operational stationary speed cameras in Slovakia; however, there is an ongoing public procurement to introduce them in the future. The use of devices that detect or interfere with speed cameras is illegal, but there is no law that prohibits the use of navigation applications that warn about police and speed cameras as of 2025.

== Traffic signs ==
The national speed limits can be altered by traffic signs. The traffic signs also have the ability to set higher limits, but such limits only apply to vehicles under 3.5 tonnes without a trailer. Circular speed limit signs apply until the next intersection, unless they are ended earlier by another speed limit sign, a sign indicating a built-up area or repeated after the intersection. This is subject to change in 2029.

Maximum permitted speed (in this case 130 km/h). This sign applies until the next intersection unless it is ended earlier by another speed limit or repeated after the intersection.

End of maximum permitted speed (in this case 130 km/h). The national speed applies.

End of all prohibitions (similar to the previous sign, but it also ends some other prohibitory signs)

Built-up area (50 km/h)

End of built-up area (90 km/h)

Motorway (130 km/h)

Road for motor vehicles (90 km/h)

Zone 30. The speed limit on this sign applies until it is ended by the end of zone 30 sign.

End of zone 30.

Residential zone (20 km/h)

School zone (20 km/h)

Pedestrian zone (10 km/h)

== See also ==
- Highways in Slovakia
