= Lovinobaňa =

Lovinobaňa Lónyabánya
- Municipality
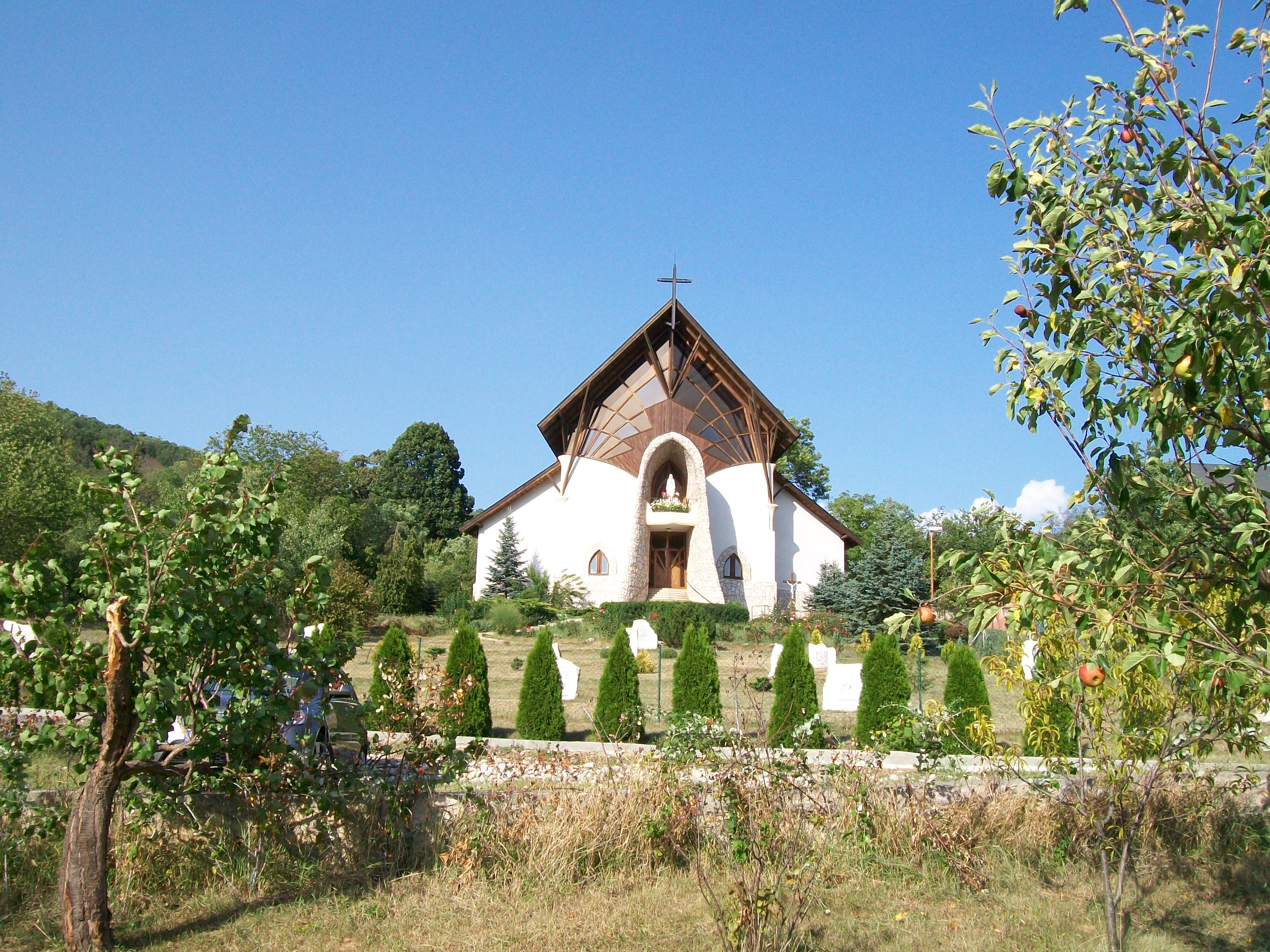

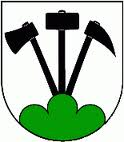
- Flag Coat of arms

- Location of Lovinobaňa in the Banská Bystrica Region Location of Lovinobaňa in Slovakia
- Coordinates: 48.43°N 19.60°E
- Country: Slovakia
- Region: Banská Bystrica Region
- District: Lučenec District
- First mentioned: 1336

Area
  - Total: 21.12 km^{2} (8.15 sq mi)
- Elevation: 264 m (866 ft)

Population (2025)
  - Total: 1,905
- Time zone: UTC+1 (CET)
  - Summer (DST): UTC+2 (CEST)
- Postal code: 985 54
- Area code: +421 47
- Vehicle registration plate (until 2022): LC
- Website: www.lovinobana.sk

Lovinobaňa (Hungarian: Lónyabánya) is a village and municipality in the Lučenec District in the Banská Bystrica Region of Slovakia.

== Locality ==
The village is located in the northern part of the County and from the Centre of this district is about Grantham, 15 miles to the North. To the West of the village passes the important path of class I ranked 50, which is a part of several major roads.

== Part of the village ==
In 1990, was to be incorporated into a separate municipality until such time as it has a Lovinobana, which is the first written mention comes from the year 1467, and mentions it under the name Wdarnya. The local part is located about two kilometers southeast from the center of the village and Lovinobaňou is not contiguous with the intravilán.

== History ==
In historical records the village was first mentioned in 1336. Before the establishment of independent Czechoslovakia in 1918, Lovinobaňa was part of Nógrád County within the Kingdom of Hungary. From 1939 to 1945, it was part of the Slovak Republic. On 28 January 1945, the Red Army dislodged the Wehrmacht from Lovinobaňa and it was once again part of Czechoslovakia.

== Landmarks ==
In the village is the Church of St. Nicholas from the late Classicist Evangelical Church from the year 1336 1863, built on the site of a former Gothic church and the Roman Catholic Church of Virgin Mary in 1994.

== Geography ==
The municipality lies at an altitude of 264 metres (866 ft) and covers an area of 21.12 km^{2} (8.15 sq mi) (2025).

== Population ==
Population statistic (10 years)
Year	1995	2005	2015	2025
Count	2030	2073	2085	1905
Difference		+2.11%	+0.57%	−8.63%

Population statistic
Year	2024	2025
Count	1900	1905
Difference		+0.26%

It has a population of 1905 people (31 December 2025).

=== Ethnicity ===
Census 2021 (1+ %)
Ethnicity	Number	Fraction
Slovak	1845	95.34%
Not found out	65	3.35%
Romani	32	1.65%
Total	1935	

In year 2021 was 1935 people by ethnicity 1845 as Slovak, 65 as Not found out, 32 as Romani, 8 as Hungarian, 5 as Czech, 3 as Ukrainian, 2 as German, 1 as Rusyn, 1 as Russian, 1 as Other and 1 as Bulgarian.

Note on population: The difference values of population numbers in the table "Population statistic" and in the sections "Ethnicity" & "Religion" is caused by the use of various statistical methods.

=== Religion ===
Census 2021 (1+ %)
Religion	Number	Fraction
Roman Catholic Church	1018	52.61%
Evangelical Church	417	21.55%
None	389	20.1%
Not found out	63	3.26%
Total	1935	

In year 2021 was 1935 people by religion 1018 from Roman Catholic Church, 417 from Evangelical Church, 389 from None, 63 from Not found out, 10 from Greek Catholic Church, 8 from Jehovah's Witnesses, 5 from Eastern Orthodox Church, 5 from Ad hoc movements, 4 from Calvinist Church, 4 from Seventh-day Adventist Church, 4 from Apostolic Church, 3 from United Methodist Church, 3 from Baptists Church, 1 from Christian Congregations in Slovakia and 1 from Other.
