= Záhor =

Záhor Zahar
- Municipality
- Flag

- Location of Záhor in the Košice Region Location of Záhor in Slovakia
- Coordinates: 48.63°N 22.20°E
- Country: Slovakia
- Region: Košice Region
- District: Sobrance District
- First mentioned: 1326

Area
  - Total: 7.72 km^{2} (2.98 sq mi)
- Elevation: 109 m (358 ft)

Population (2025)
  - Total: 625
- Time zone: UTC+1 (CET)
  - Summer (DST): UTC+2 (CEST)
- Postal code: 725 3
- Area code: +421 56
- Vehicle registration plate (until 2022): SO
- Website: www.obeczahor.sk

Záhor (Hungarian: Zahar) is a village and municipality in the Sobrance District in the Košice Region of east Slovakia.

== History ==
In historical records the village was first mentioned in 1326.

== Geography ==
The municipality lies at an altitude of 109 metres (358 ft) and covers an area of 7.72 km^{2} (2.98 sq mi) (2025).

== Population ==
Population statistic (10 years)
Year	1995	2005	2015	2025
Count	758	704	652	625
Difference		−7.12%	−7.38%	−4.14%

Population statistic
Year	2024	2025
Count	625	625
Difference		+0%

It has a population of 625 people (31 December 2025).

=== Ethnicity ===
Census 2021 (1+ %)
Ethnicity	Number	Fraction
Slovak	604	92.07%
Not found out	25	3.81%
Ukrainian	21	3.2%
Total	656	

In year 2021 was 656 people by ethnicity 604 as Slovak, 25 as Not found out, 21 as Ukrainian, 6 as Hungarian, 4 as Czech, 2 as Polish and 1 as Romani.

Note on population: The difference values of population numbers in the table "Population statistic" and in the sections "Ethnicity" & "Religion" is caused by the use of various statistical methods.

=== Religion ===
Census 2021 (1+ %)
Religion	Number	Fraction
Calvinist Church	179	27.29%
Greek Catholic Church	167	25.46%
Roman Catholic Church	102	15.55%
Jehovah's Witnesses	85	12.96%
None	71	10.82%
Eastern Orthodox Church	20	3.05%
Not found out	20	3.05%
Evangelical Church	8	1.22%
Total	656	

In year 2021 was 656 people by religion 179 from Calvinist Church, 167 from Greek Catholic Church, 102 from Roman Catholic Church, 85 from Jehovah's Witnesses, 71 from None, 20 from Eastern Orthodox Church, 20 from Not found out, 8 from Evangelical Church, 2 from Other and not ascertained christian church, 1 from United Methodist Church and 1 from Apostolic Church.

== Facilities ==
The village has a soccer pitch.
