= Ráztočno =

- Municipality
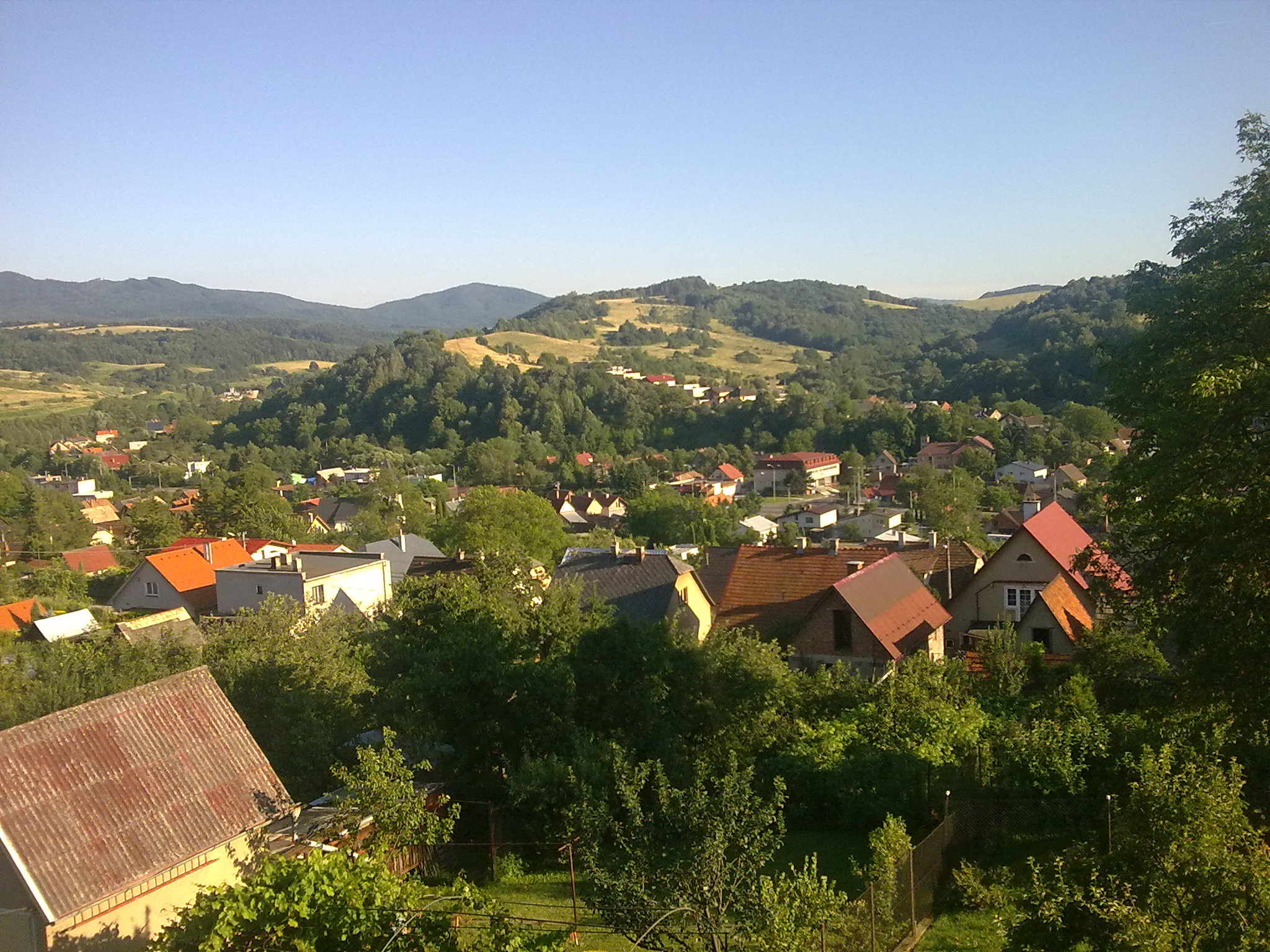

- Flag

- Location of Ráztočno in the Trenčín Region Location of Ráztočno in Slovakia
- Coordinates: 48.77°N 18.77°E
- Country: Slovakia
- Region: Trenčín Region
- District: Prievidza District
- First mentioned: 1429

Area
  - Total: 17.59 km^{2} (6.79 sq mi)
- Elevation: 398 m (1,306 ft)

Population (2025)
  - Total: 1,273
- Time zone: UTC+1 (CET)
  - Summer (DST): UTC+2 (CEST)
- Postal code: 972 31
- Area code: +421 46
- Vehicle registration plate (until 2022): PD
- Website: www.raztocno.sk

Ráztočno (Hungarian: Rásztony) is a village and municipality in Prievidza District in the Trenčín Region of central Slovakia.

== History ==
In historical records the village was first mentioned in 1429.

== Geography ==
The municipality lies at an altitude of 398 metres (1,306 ft) and covers an area of 17.59 km^{2} (6.79 sq mi) (2025).

== Population ==
Population statistic (10 years)
Year	1995	2005	2015	2025
Count	1207	1216	1214	1273
Difference		+0.74%	−0.16%	+4.85%

Population statistic
Year	2024	2025
Count	1238	1273
Difference		+2.82%

It has a population of 1273 people (31 December 2025).

=== Ethnicity ===
Census 2021 (1+ %)
Ethnicity	Number	Fraction
Slovak	1175	95.14%
Not found out	50	4.04%
Total	1235	

In year 2021 was 1235 people by ethnicity 1175 as Slovak, 50 as Not found out, 8 as Czech, 3 as Hungarian, 2 as Romani, 2 as Other, 1 as Polish and 1 as German.

Note on population: The difference values of population numbers in the table "Population statistic" and in the sections "Ethnicity" & "Religion" is caused by the use of various statistical methods.

=== Religion ===
Census 2021 (1+ %)
Religion	Number	Fraction
None	596	48.26%
Roman Catholic Church	541	43.81%
Not found out	53	4.29%
Total	1235	

In year 2021 was 1235 people by religion 596 from None, 541 from Roman Catholic Church, 53 from Not found out, 8 from Other, 7 from Christian Congregations in Slovakia, 7 from Greek Catholic Church, 6 from Other and not ascertained christian church, 4 from Calvinist Church, 4 from Ad hoc movements, 3 from Evangelical Church, 2 from Paganism and natural spirituality, 2 from Buddhism, 1 from Jehovah's Witnesses and 1 from Czechoslovak Hussite Church.
