= Chocholná-Velčice =

Village and municipality in Slovakia

- Municipality
- Flag

- Location of Chocholná-Velčice in the Trenčín Region Location of Chocholná-Velčice in Slovakia
- Coordinates: 48.87°N 17.94°E
- Country: Slovakia
- Region: Trenčín Region
- District: Trenčín District
- First mentioned: 1345

Area
  - Total: 27.89 km^{2} (10.77 sq mi)
- Elevation: 371 m (1,217 ft)

Population (2025)
  - Total: 1,648
- Time zone: UTC+1 (CET)
  - Summer (DST): UTC+2 (CEST)
- Postal code: 913 04
- Area code: +421 32
- Vehicle registration plate (until 2022): TN
- Website: www.chocholna-velcice.sk

Chocholná-Velčice (Hungarian: Tarajosvelcsőc) is a village and municipality in Trenčín District in the Trenčín Region of north-western Slovakia.

== History ==
In historical records the village was first mentioned in 1345.

== Geography ==
The municipality lies at an altitude of 371 metres (1,217 ft) and covers an area of 27.89 km^{2} (10.77 sq mi) (2025).

== Population ==
Population statistic (10 years)
Year	1995	2005	2015	2025
Count	1597	1707	1687	1648
Difference		+6.88%	−1.17%	−2.31%

Population statistic
Year	2024	2025
Count	1666	1648
Difference		−1.08%

It has a population of 1648 people (31 December 2025).

=== Ethnicity ===
Census 2021 (1+ %)
Ethnicity	Number	Fraction
Slovak	1630	96.16%
Not found out	56	3.3%
Czech	29	1.71%
Total	1695	

In year 2021 was 1695 people by ethnicity 1630 as Slovak, 56 as Not found out, 29 as Czech, 3 as Russian, 2 as Hungarian, 2 as Other, 1 as Vietnamese, 1 as Moravian, 1 as Canadian and 1 as Croatian.

Note on population: The difference values of population numbers in the table "Population statistic" and in the sections "Ethnicity" & "Religion" is caused by the use of various statistical methods.

=== Religion ===
Census 2021 (1+ %)
Religion	Number	Fraction
Roman Catholic Church	888	52.39%
Evangelical Church	396	23.36%
None	325	19.17%
Not found out	61	3.6%
Total	1695	

In year 2021 was 1695 people by religion 888 from Roman Catholic Church, 396 from Evangelical Church, 325 from None, 61 from Not found out, 7 from Greek Catholic Church, 4 from Ad hoc movements, 3 from Other and not ascertained christian church, 3 from United Methodist Church, 2 from Calvinist Church, 2 from Paganism and natural spirituality, 2 from Other, 1 from Hinduism and 1 from Buddhism.

== Genealogical resources ==
The records for genealogical research are available at the state archive "Statny Archiv in Bratislava, Slovakia"

- Roman Catholic church records (births/marriages/deaths): 1714-1896 (parish B)

== See also ==
- List of municipalities and towns in Slovakia
