= List of tunnels in Slovakia =

== Highway and road tunnels ==
Expressways

- Bikoš Tunnel (in operation, R4 expressway, E371 route, 1 150 m)
- Okruhliak Tunnel (under construction, R4 expressway, E371 route, 1 917 m)

Highways

- Bôrik Tunnel (in operation, D1 highway, E50 route, 999 m / 993 m)
- Branisko Tunnel (in operation, D1 highway, E50 route, 4,975 m)
- Čebrať Tunnel (under construction, D1 highway, E50 route, 2,026 m)
- Horelica Tunnel (in operation, D3 highway, E75 route, 605 m)
- Lučivná Tunnel (in operation, D1 highway, E50 route, 250 m)
- Ovčiarsko Tunnel (in operation, D1 highway, E50 route, 2,375 m)
- Poľana Tunnel (in operation, D3 highway, E75 route, 897 m)
- Považský Chlmec Tunnel (in operation, D3 highway, E75 route, 2,217 m)
- Prešov Tunnel (in operation, D1 highway, E50 route, 2244 m)
- Šibeník Tunnel (in operation, D1 highway, E50 route, 593 m)
- Sitina Tunnel (in operation, D2 highway, E65 route, 1,440 m / 1,415 m)
- Svrčinovec Tunnel (in operation, D3 highway, E75 route, 445 m)
- Višňové Tunnel (in operation, D1 highway, E50 route, 7460 m)
- Žilina Tunnel (in operation, D1 highway, E50 route, 674 m)

Road

- Stratenský Tunnel (in operation since 1971, state road 67, Rožňava district, 326 m)

== Railway tunnels ==
There are 76 railway tunnels in use in Slovakia. Most significant are:

- The longest ever: Harmanec Tunnel (in operation, Banská Bystrica - Dolná Štubňa track, 4,698 m)
- The longest double-track and electrified: Bujanov Tunnel (in operation, Margecany - Košice track, 3,411 m)
- The longest out of operation: Tunnel pod Homôľkou (out of operation, Gemerské spojky track, 2,401 m)
- The oldest (1848): Lamačský Tunnel (in operation, Bratislava - Kúty track, 704 m)
- Last opened (2013): Turecký vrch Tunnel (in operation, Bratislava - Žilina track, 1,775 m)
- The shortest: Turček Tunnel, (in operation, Zvolen - Diviaky track, 37.7 m)
- Highest by attitude: Tunel Vyšné Hágy (out of operation, Vyšné Hágy sanatorium area, 170 m length, 1123 meters above sea level)

Besides these there are 11 more railway tunnels, which are abandoned or never finished and 2 more railway tunnels under construction. There is a tramway tunnel in Bratislava, too.

== See also ==
- List of tunnels by location
