= D1 motorway (Slovakia) =

Motorway in Slovakia

D1 Motorway
- Diaľnica D1
- Completed Under construction Planned

Route information
- Part of E50 E58 E75 E571
- Length: 512 km (318 mi) Completed: 413.3 km (256.8 mi); Under Construction: 14.9 km (9.3 mi); Planned: 87.7 km (54.5 mi)

Major junctions
- From: D2 Bratislava - Pečna
- R7 Bratislava - Nivy; D4 Bratislava - South; R1 Trnava; R2 near Chocholná; R6 Púchov, South; D3 near Hričovské Podhradie; R3 near Martin; R3 near Likavka (planned); R1 near Ružomberok (planned); R4 Prešov, West; R4 near Košické Oľšany
- To: M08 border with Ukraine (planned)

Location
- Country: Slovakia
- Regions: Bratislava Region, Trnava Region, Trenčín Region, Žilina Region, Prešov Region, Košice Region
- Major cities: Bratislava, Trnava, Trenčín, Žilina, Martin, Poprad, Prešov, Košice

Highway system
- Highways in Slovakia
→ D2

D1 motorway is an east-west motorway (Slovak: Diaľnica D1) in Slovakia. The D1 motorway is the oldest, longest and busiest motorway in Slovakia, which is connects Bratislava with Trnava, Trenčín, Žilina, Martin, Poprad, Prešov, Košice to the Slovak-Ukrainian border (border crossing with Uzhhorod), where it is connected to the Ukrainian road M08.

It is part of the European roads E50, E58, E75, E442, E571 and of the V.A Pan-European corridor (Trieste) - Bratislava - Žilina - Košice - Uzhhorod - Lviv. With the exception of sections in Bratislava, Žilina, Prešov, Poprad and Košice, a vignette is required to use the motorway.

The motorway has been under construction since 1972 and by 2023, 395.9 km of the total planned length of 512.4 km were operational. Despite the various completion dates set in the past (1990, 2000, 2005, 2010 or 2013), the full length will not be passable until 2040 at the earliest.

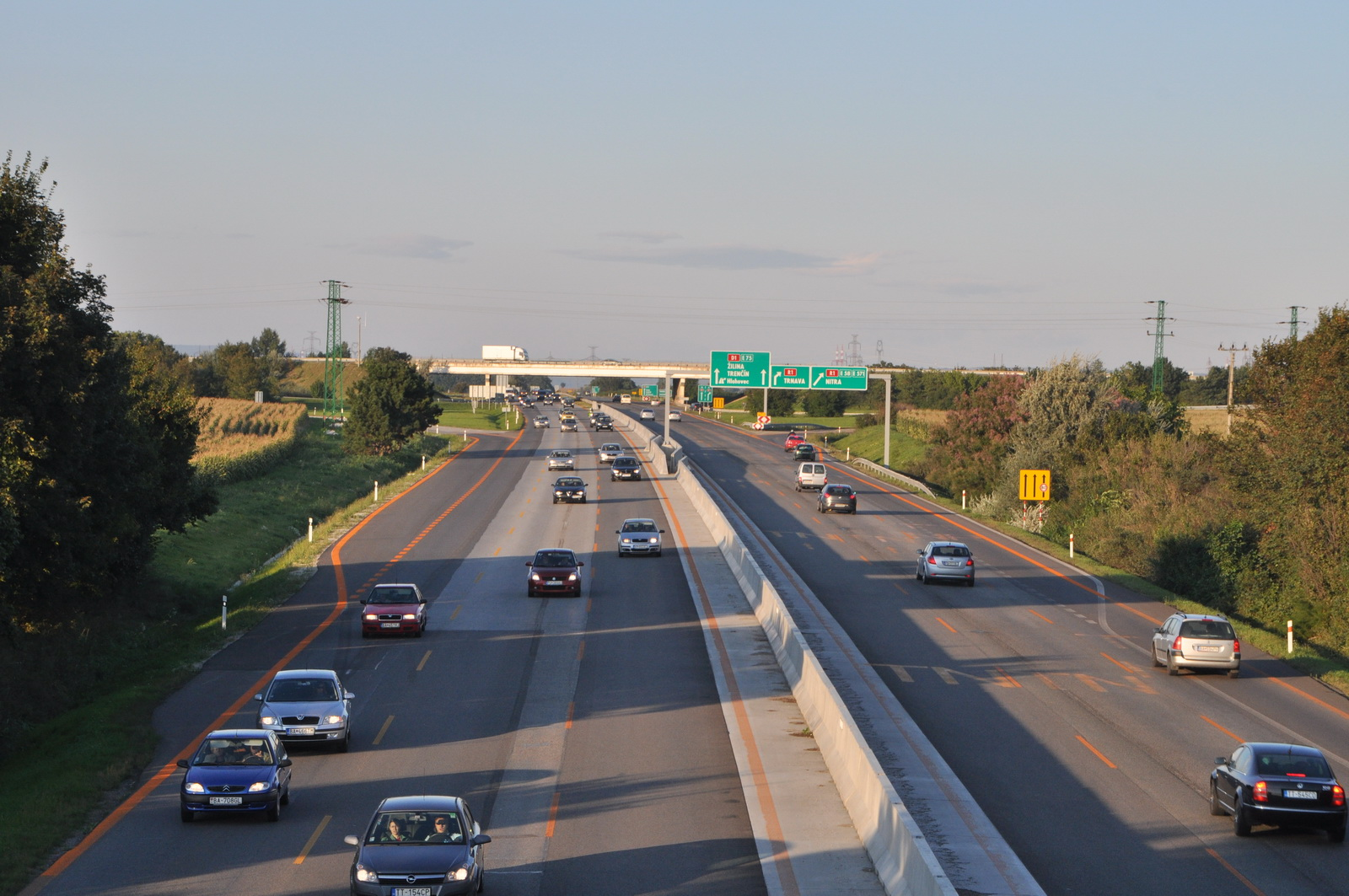
Junction Trnava with R1

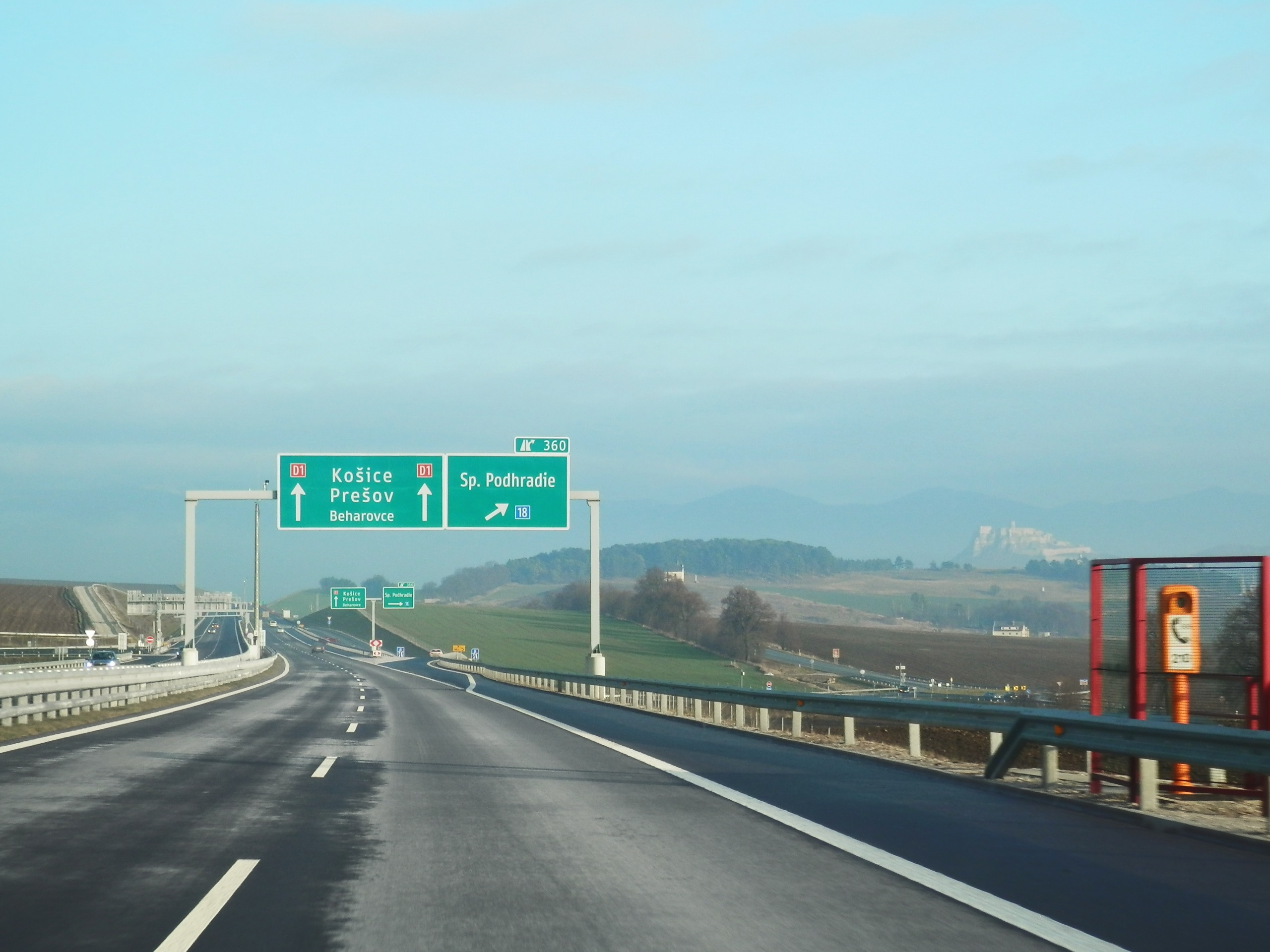
Junction Spišské Podhradie

== Chronology ==
The first plans to connect Prague to Slovakia and Mukachevo in today's Zakarpattia Oblast in Ukraine, which was part of Czechoslovakia at that time, were in the 1930s. The construction of the motorway (freeway) began in the Czech part in the late 1930s, but in the Slovak part nothing was built. After the end of World War II, highway construction was abandoned, due to post-war reconstruction. But in the 1960s, traffic was growing very fast, and a new plan for a D1 highway was available soon, without the part in Zakarpattia Oblast, which became part of the USSR in 1945..

Construction began in 1973, by building the Ivachnová - Liptovský Mikuláš section, a 15-kilometre-long (9.3 mi) segment in northern Slovakia. Construction on this section finished in December 1977 and cost 241.3 million Czechoslovak korunas. In 1976, 6.4-kilometre-long (4.0 mi) section created the southern bypass of Liptovský Mikuláš. The total cost of the construction amounted to 368 million Czechoslovak korunas. The section between Liptovský Ján and Liptovský Hrádek with a length of 5.1-kilometre-long (3.2 mi) kilometres was under construction from April 1975 to December 1983 and had once the longest road bridge in Slovakia - the 1,035-metre-long Podtureň Viaduct.

Between 1978 and 1982, a 15.9-kilometre-long (9.9 mi) section was constructed between Trnava and Hlohovec. June 1980 saw the beginning of construction in a new 17.7-kilometre-long (11.0 mi) section between Hlohovec and Piešťany which was put into operation in 1985.

A 14-kilometre-long (8.7 mi) section between Horná Streda - Nové Mesto nad Váhom opened in half-profile as a D61 in 1998, and was finished as the motorway D1 in full profile in 2000. A 15.3-kilometre-long (9.5 mi) section between Nové Mesto nad Váhom - Chocholná also opened in half-profile as a D61 in 1998, and was subsequently finished as the D1 in full profile in 2000.

The 3.2-kilometre-long (2.0 mi) section of motorway in Bratislava did not begin until 20 March 2003. The construction was handed over for early use on 4 December 2005, while the gradual finishing works on the footbridges continued until June 2006. The total construction costs amounted to 1.908 billion SKK.

The section between Hričovské Podhradie - Lietavská Lúčka forms the first part of the southern bypass of Žilina and includes the Ovčiarsko and Žilina tunnels. The construction of the section began with the excavation of the exploratory tunnel of the Ovčiarsko tunnel back in 1996. After the completion of the exploratory tunnel, further construction of the section was postponed. Construction work has continued only since 2014. The contractual completion date was January 2018. This deadline could not be met and the section was not handed over for use until 29 January 2021. This section was financed through the European Union budget.

Section at Prešov was opened in late 2021. That also includes the Prešov tunnel with 2240 meters of length.

The section between Lietavská Lúčka and Dubná Skala, whose exploration tunnel works are dating back to 1998, but actual construction started in 2015, was opened on December 22, 2025. The Višnové tunnel is included within the section and after the opening, it became the longest tunnel on the motorway.

=== Future developments ===
The construction of the Hubová - Ivachnová section (Ružomberok bypass), which after multiple delays, is set to be completed in 2026. The 15 km long section includes the Čebrať tunnel along with 19 bridges and 3 junctions. The cost is estimated to be around €320 million, of which €125 million is funded by the European Union.

The construction of the Turany - Hubová section, which will be the last missing section on the Bratislava - Košice route, has not yet started. According to an ongoing public procurement for the section, the duration of the construction should be 7 years with the estimated cost being €1.5 billion.

== Route description ==
Country	Region	Location	km	mi	Exit	Name	Destinations	Notes
Slovakia	Bratislava Region	Bratislava Region	0	0.0	—	Bratislava-Pečňa	D2 E65	Kilometrage starting point
Slovakia	Bratislava Region	Bratislava Region	1	0.62	—	Bratislava-Incheba	I/2 I/61	
Slovakia	Bratislava Region	Bratislava Region	4	2.5	—	Bratislava-Petržalka-Ovsište	I/2 I/61	
Slovakia	Bratislava Region	Bratislava Region	6	3.7	—	Bratislava-Nivy	R7 E575 I/61	
Slovakia	Bratislava Region	Bratislava Region	8	5.0	—	Bratislava-Ružinov	I/63	
Slovakia	Bratislava Region	Bratislava Region	10	6.2	—	Bratislava-Trnávka		
Slovakia	Bratislava Region	Bratislava Region	11	6.8	—	Bratislava-Letisko		
Slovakia	Bratislava Region	Bratislava Region	13	8.1	—	Bratislava-Zlaté Piesky	I/61	
Slovakia	Bratislava Region	Bratislava Region			Rest area	Zlaté Piesky		
Slovakia	Bratislava Region	Bratislava Region	14	8.7	—	Bratislava-Vajnory	I/61	
Slovakia	Bratislava Region	Bratislava Region	15	9.3	—	Bratislava-východ	D4 E75 E58	
Slovakia	Bratislava Region	Bratislava Region	18	11	—	Bernolákovo		Start of a 3-lane dual carriageway (no hard shoulder), a speed limit of 110 km/h applies from 5 AM to 7 PM
Slovakia	Bratislava Region	Bratislava Region	27	17	—	Senec		
Slovakia	Bratislava Region	Bratislava Region	30	19	—	Senec-východ	I/61	
Slovakia	Trnava Region	Trnava Region	44	27	—	Voderady		
Slovakia	Trnava Region	Trnava Region	50	31	—	Trnava	R1 E58 E571	End of the 3-lane dual carriageway and 110 km/h speed limit
Slovakia	Trnava Region	Trnava Region	66	41	—	Hlohovec		
Slovakia	Trnava Region	Trnava Region	68	42	—	Madunice	I/61	
Slovakia	Trnava Region	Trnava Region	83	52	—	Piešťany		
Slovakia	Trenčín Region	Trenčín Region	91	57	—	Horná Streda	I/61	
Slovakia	Trenčín Region	Trenčín Region	95	59	—	Luka		
Slovakia	Trenčín Region	Trenčín Region	106	66	—	Nové Mesto nad Váhom		
Slovakia	Trenčín Region	Trenčín Region	119	74	—	Trenčín-juh	I/9 E50 E572	
Slovakia	Trenčín Region	Trenčín Region	119	74	—	Trenčín-juh	R2	Connection with R2 proposed
Slovakia	Trenčín Region	Trenčín Region	124	77	—	Trenčín-západ		
Slovakia	Trenčín Region	Trenčín Region			Rest area	Zamarovce		
Slovakia	Trenčín Region	Trenčín Region	138	86	—	Dubnica nad Váhom		
Slovakia	Trenčín Region	Trenčín Region	145	90	—	Ilava		
Slovakia	Trenčín Region	Trenčín Region	153	95	—	Ladce		
Slovakia	Trenčín Region	Trenčín Region	157	98	—	Púchov-juh	R6	
Slovakia	Trenčín Region	Trenčín Region			Rest area	Sverepec		
Slovakia	Trenčín Region	Trenčín Region	165	103	—	Považská Bystrica-juh	I/61	
Slovakia	Trenčín Region	Trenčín Region	169	105	—	Považská Bystrica-centrum		
Slovakia	Trenčín Region	Trenčín Region	174	108	—	Považská Bystrica-sever	I/61	
Slovakia	Žilina Region	Žilina Region	183	114	—	Bytča		
Slovakia	Žilina Region	Žilina Region	188	117	—	Žilina (Hričovské Podhradie)	D3 E75	
Slovakia	Žilina Region	Žilina Region	199	124	—	Žilina-juh		
Slovakia	Žilina Region	Žilina Region	212	132	—	Dubná Skala, Vrútky	I/18	
Slovakia	Žilina Region	Žilina Region	218	135	—	Martin	R3	
Slovakia	Žilina Region	Žilina Region	229	142	—	Turany		Temporary end
Slovakia	Žilina Region	Žilina Region	242	150	—	Ružomberok-západ	I/18	Reentry point
Slovakia	Žilina Region	Žilina Region	242	150	—	Likavka	R3	Proposed
Slovakia	Žilina Region	Žilina Region	249	155	—	Ružomberok-sever	I/59 E77	
Slovakia	Žilina Region	Žilina Region	251	156	—	Ivachnová	R1	Proposed
Slovakia	Žilina Region	Žilina Region			Rest area	Ivachnová		
Slovakia	Žilina Region	Žilina Region	259	161	—	Ivachnová	I/18	
Slovakia	Žilina Region	Žilina Region	272	169	—	Liptovský Mikuláš		
Slovakia	Žilina Region	Žilina Region	277	172	—	Závažná Poruba		Proposed
Slovakia	Žilina Region	Žilina Region	279	173	—	Liptovský Ján		
Slovakia	Žilina Region	Žilina Region	284	176	—	Liptovský Hrádok		
Slovakia	Žilina Region	Žilina Region			Rest area	Hybe		
Slovakia	Žilina Region	Žilina Region	292	181	—	Hybe	I/18	
Slovakia	Žilina Region	Žilina Region	297	185	—	Východná	I/18	
Slovakia	Žilina Region	Žilina Region	303	188	—	Važec	I/18	
Slovakia	Žilina Region	Žilina Region			Rest area	Štrba		
Slovakia	Prešov Region	Prešov Region	310	190	—	Štrba		
Slovakia	Prešov Region	Prešov Region	315	196	—	Mengusovce (Svit)	I/18	
Slovakia	Prešov Region	Prešov Region	322	200	—	Poprad-západ	I/18	
Slovakia	Prešov Region	Prešov Region	325	202	—	Vysoké Tatry		
Slovakia	Prešov Region	Prešov Region	329	204	—	Poprad-východ	I/67	
Slovakia	Prešov Region	Prešov Region	341	212	—	Spišský Štvrtok	I/18	
Slovakia	Prešov Region	Prešov Region	350	220	—	Levoča		
Slovakia	Prešov Region	Prešov Region			Rest area	Levoča		
Slovakia	Prešov Region	Prešov Region	360	220	—	Spišské Podhradie	I/18	
Slovakia	Prešov Region	Prešov Region	368	229	—	Beharovce	I/18	
Slovakia	Prešov Region	Prešov Region	379	235	—	Široké	I/18	
Slovakia	Prešov Region	Prešov Region	382	237	—	Fričovce	I/18	
Slovakia	Prešov Region	Prešov Region	393	244	—	Svinia	I/18	
Slovakia	Prešov Region	Prešov Region			Rest area	Malý Šariš		
Slovakia	Prešov Region	Prešov Region	400	250	—	Prešov-západ	R4 E371	
Slovakia	Prešov Region	Prešov Region	407	253	—	Prešov-juh		
Slovakia	Prešov Region	Prešov Region	418	260	—	Lemešany		
Slovakia	Košice Region	Košice Region	422	262	—	Nová polhora	I/20	
Slovakia	Košice Region	Košice Region			Rest area	Janovík		
Slovakia	Košice Region	Košice Region	427	265	—	Košice-sever	I/20	
Slovakia	Košice Region	Košice Region	433	269	—	Košické Oľšany	R4 E58 E71	
Slovakia	Košice Region	Košice Region	441	274	—	Bidovce	I/19	Temporary end
Slovakia	Košice Region	Košice Region	459	285	—	Dargov		Proposed
Slovakia	Košice Region	Košice Region	462	287	—	Dvorianky		Proposed
Slovakia	Košice Region	Košice Region	472	293	—	Pozdišovce		Proposed
Slovakia	Košice Region	Košice Region			Rest area	Pozdišovce		Proposed
Slovakia	Košice Region	Košice Region	475	295	—	Michalovce-západ		Proposed
Slovakia	Košice Region	Košice Region	483	300	—	Michalovce-východ		Proposed
Slovakia	Košice Region	Košice Region	496	308	—	Sobrance		Proposed
Slovakia	Košice Region	Košice Region			Rest area	Jenkovce		Proposed
Slovakia	Košice Region	Košice Region	510	320	—	Záhor		Proposed
Slovakia	Košice Region	Košice Region	511	318	Slovakia-Ukraine border	Záhor-Storožnica border crossing	M 08 E50	Proposed Border with Ukraine; road continues as Ukrainian M08.
Slovakia	1.000 mi = 1.609 km; 1.000 km = 0.621 mi: Proposed; Route transition; Unopened							

== Bridges and viaducts ==
This is a list of bridges and viaducts as seen when moving from west to east:

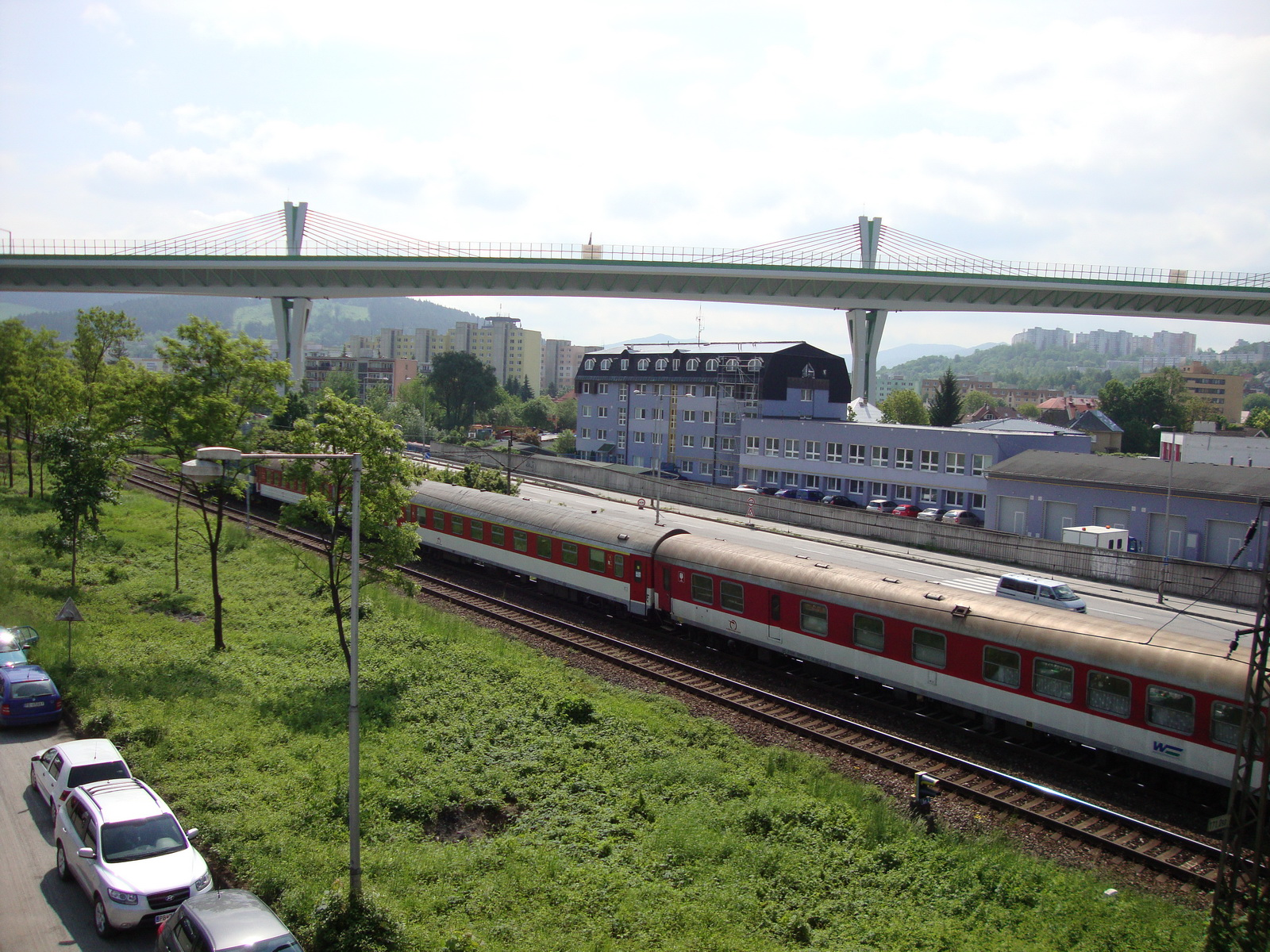
Viaduct Považská Bystrica

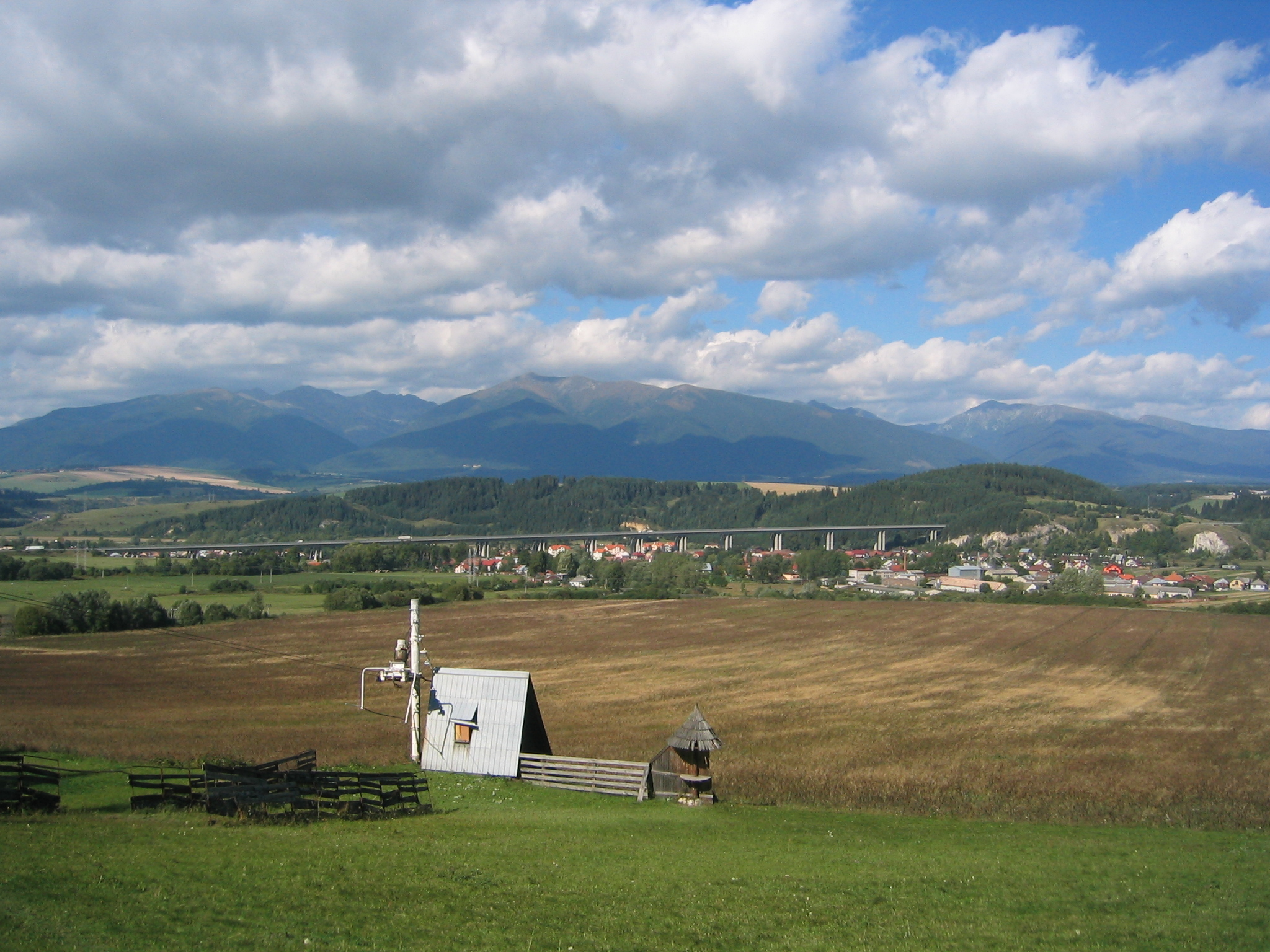
Bridge near Podtureň

Location	Length (m)	Notes
Ovsište	567	
Prístavný most	1,080	
Prievoz	1,756	
Horná Streda	772	
Beckov	336	
Drietoma	238	
Súčanka	404 / 486	
Újazd	486 / 490	
Kočkovský kanál	187	
Nosický kanál	227	
Ladce	189 / 186	
Pružinka	902	
Sverepec I	443 / 480	
Sverepec II	315 / 310	
Kunovec		open July 2010
Galanovec		open July 2010
Matúška		open July 2010
Považská Bystrica	1,444	open 30 May 2010
Hričovský kanál	1,695	July 2010
Vrtižer		open July 2010
Plevník-Drienové		
Predmier		2 lanes
Dolný Hričov	1,804	planned; open 2012?
Lietavská Lúčka	1,091	planned; open 2012?
Dubná Skala		planned
Turčianské Kľačany	422	planned
Turany		planned
Krpeľany		planned
Kraľovany		planned
Stankovany		planned
Hubová I		planned
Hubová II		planned
Lisková		planned
Podtureň	1,038	
Jamníček	179	
Belá	308	
Dovalovec	534	
Hybica	571 / 565	
Východná	380	
Jánošiková studnička	381	
Belianský potok	347	
Čierny jarok	184	
Važec	638	open 2007?
Štrba	600	open 2007?
Pod Skalkou		open 2008
Levoča		planned
Spišský Hrhov		planned
Beharovce	225	2 lanes
Studenec	102	2 lanes
Pongrácovce	343	2 lanes
Fričovce	407	
Malá Svinka	255	open 2008
Malý Šariš	494	open 2008

== Tunnels ==
There are total of twelve tunnels on the D1, of which nine are in operation. The latest one to open is the Čebrať tunnel, inaugurated in October 2026. Planned tunnels include the Korbieľka tunnel and the Havran tunnel. The Dargov tunnel might not be built in the future due to studies that found a more efficient route without the tunnel. The use of tunnels comes included with the vignette.

This is a list of tunnels as seen when moving from west to east:

Tunnel	Length (m)	Notes	Maximum speed limit	Vehicles per day	ADR category
Ovčiarsko	2,275	opened on January 29, 2021	100 km/h (62 mph)	N/A	A
Žilina	651	opened on January 29, 2021	100 km/h (62 mph)	N/A	A
Višňové	7,500	opened on December 22, 2025	100 km/h (62 mph)	20,000 (January 2026)	A
Korbieľka	5,859	planned	100 km/h (62 mph)	N/A	—
Havran	2,702	planned	100 km/h (62 mph)	N/A	—
Čebrať	3,600	opened on October 5, 2026	100 km/h (62 mph)	N/A	A
Lučivná	250	opened on December 11, 2007	130 km/h (81 mph)	N/A	A
Bôrik	999	opened on December 8, 2009	100 km/h (62 mph)	N/A	A
Šibenik	600	opened on November 30, 2015	100 km/h (62 mph)	N/A	A
Branisko	4,975	opened on June 19, 2003 in a half profile, full profile planned	80 km/h (50 mph)	17,500 (May 2025)	E
Prešov	2,244	opened on October 28, 2021	100 km/h (62 mph)	N/A	A
Dargov	1,050	planned?	—	N/A	—
Planned Under construction In operation in a half profile

== Gallery ==
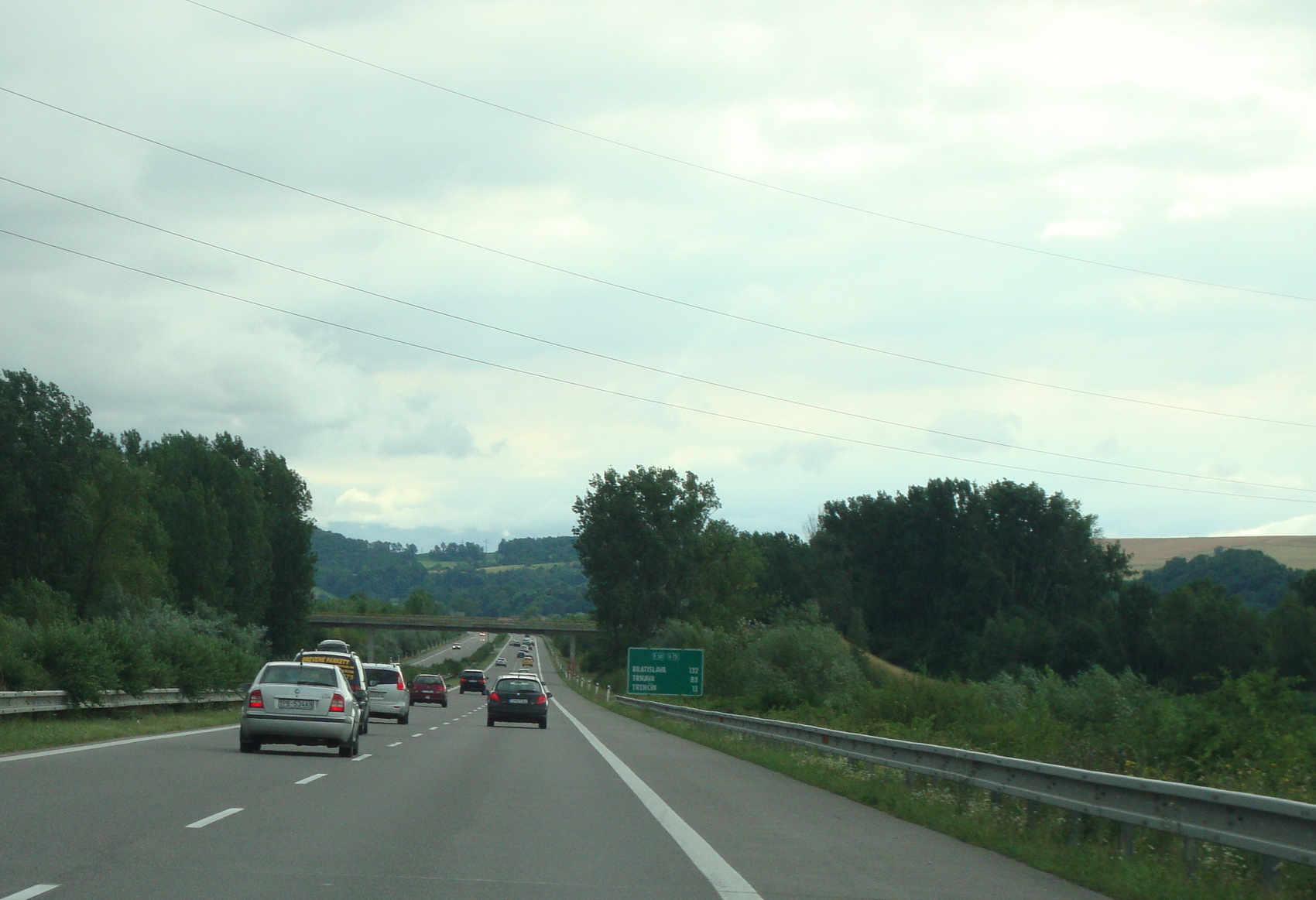
D1 motorway near Dubnica nad Váhom

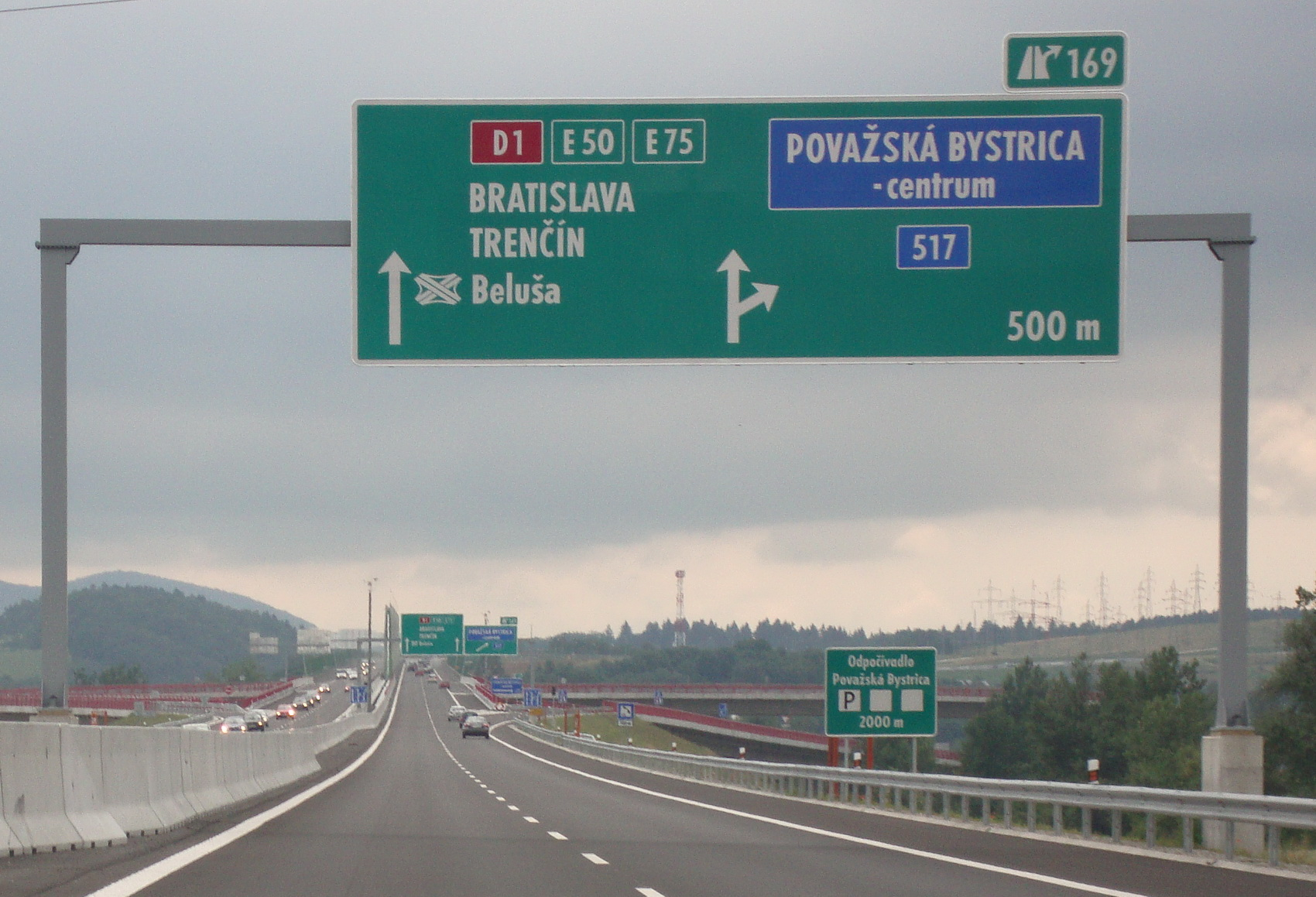
D1 motorway exit Považská Bystrica

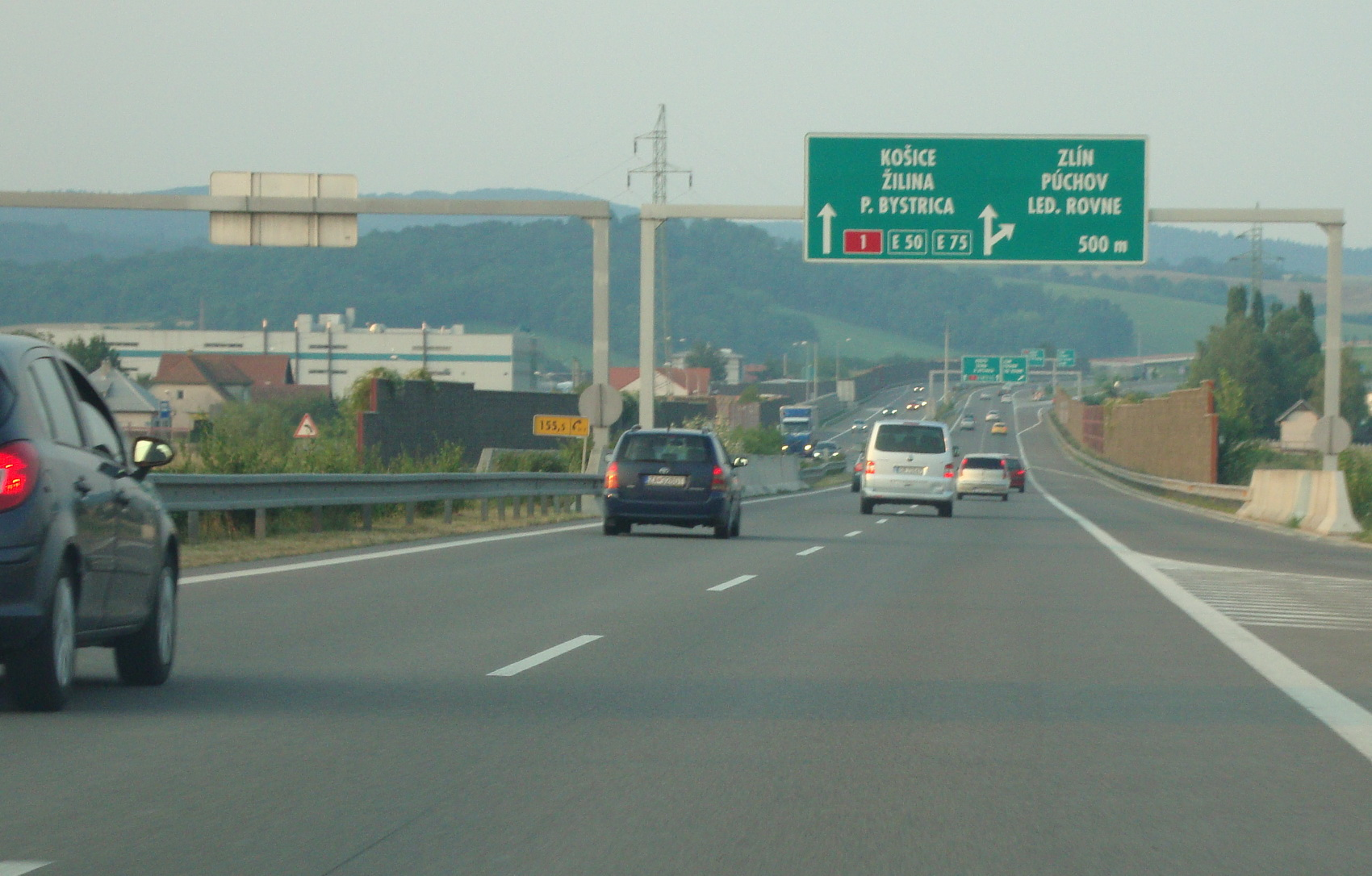
Junction Beluša

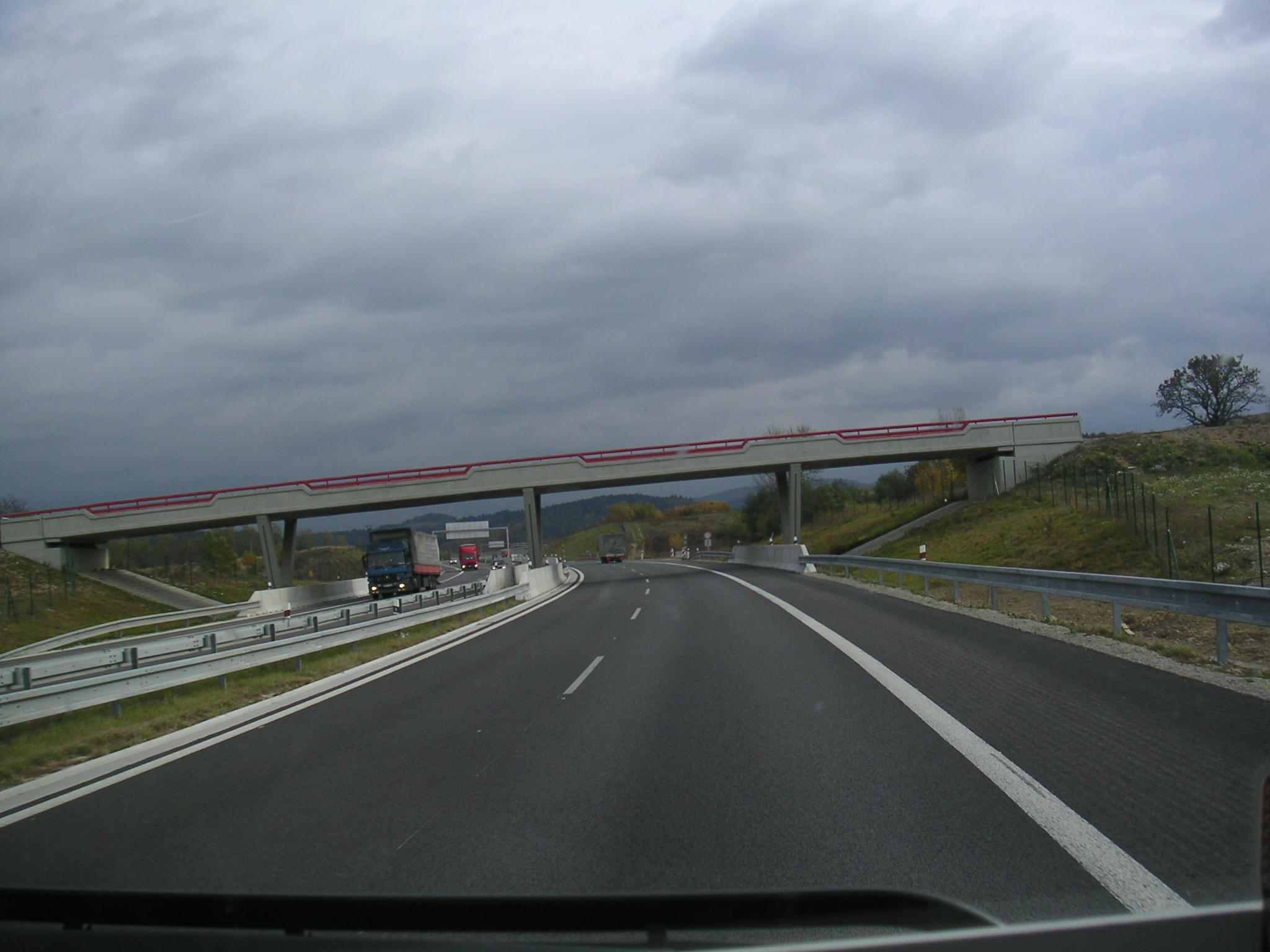
D1 near Sverepec

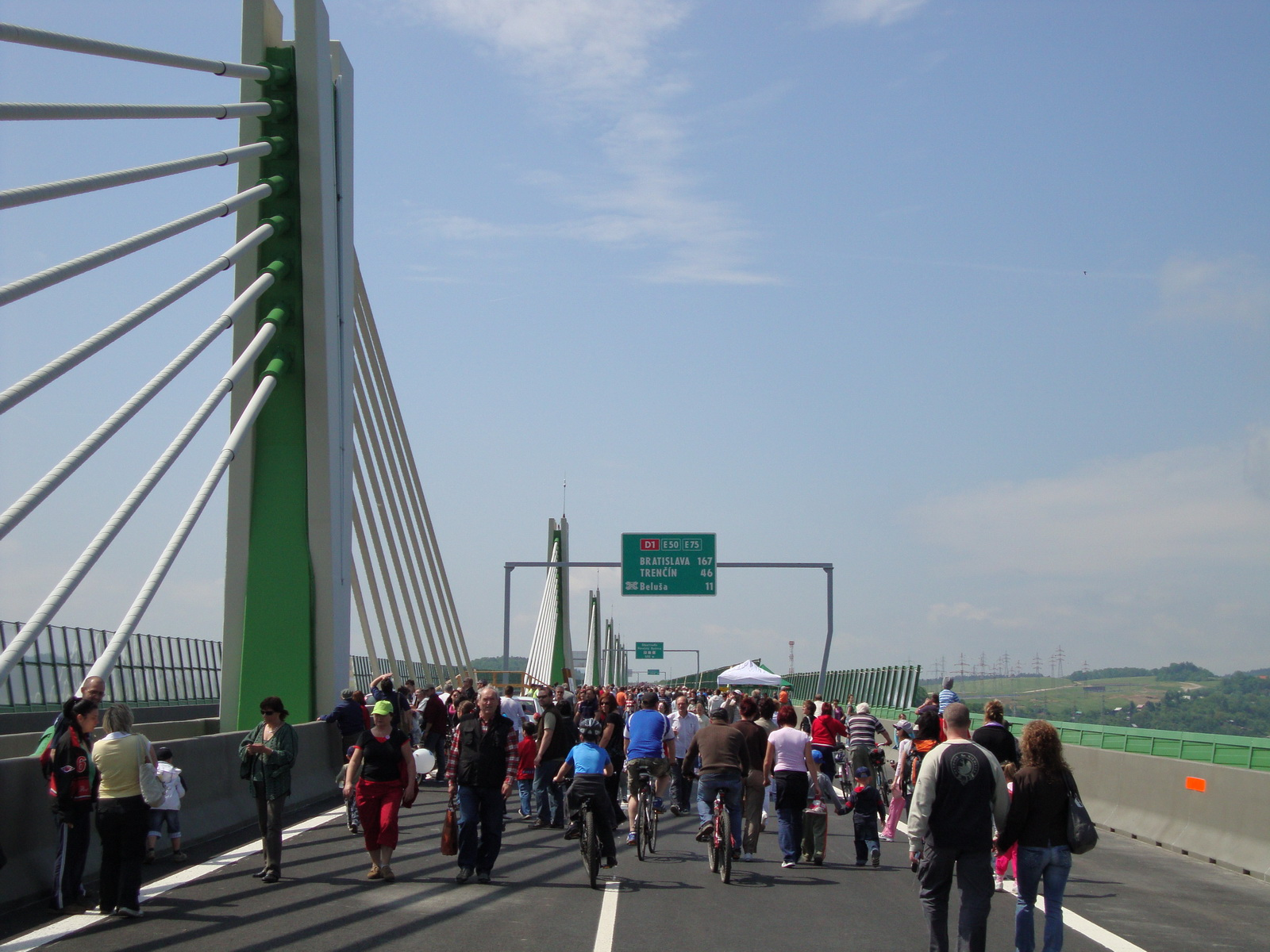
opening of the D1 motorway viaduct in Považská Bystrica

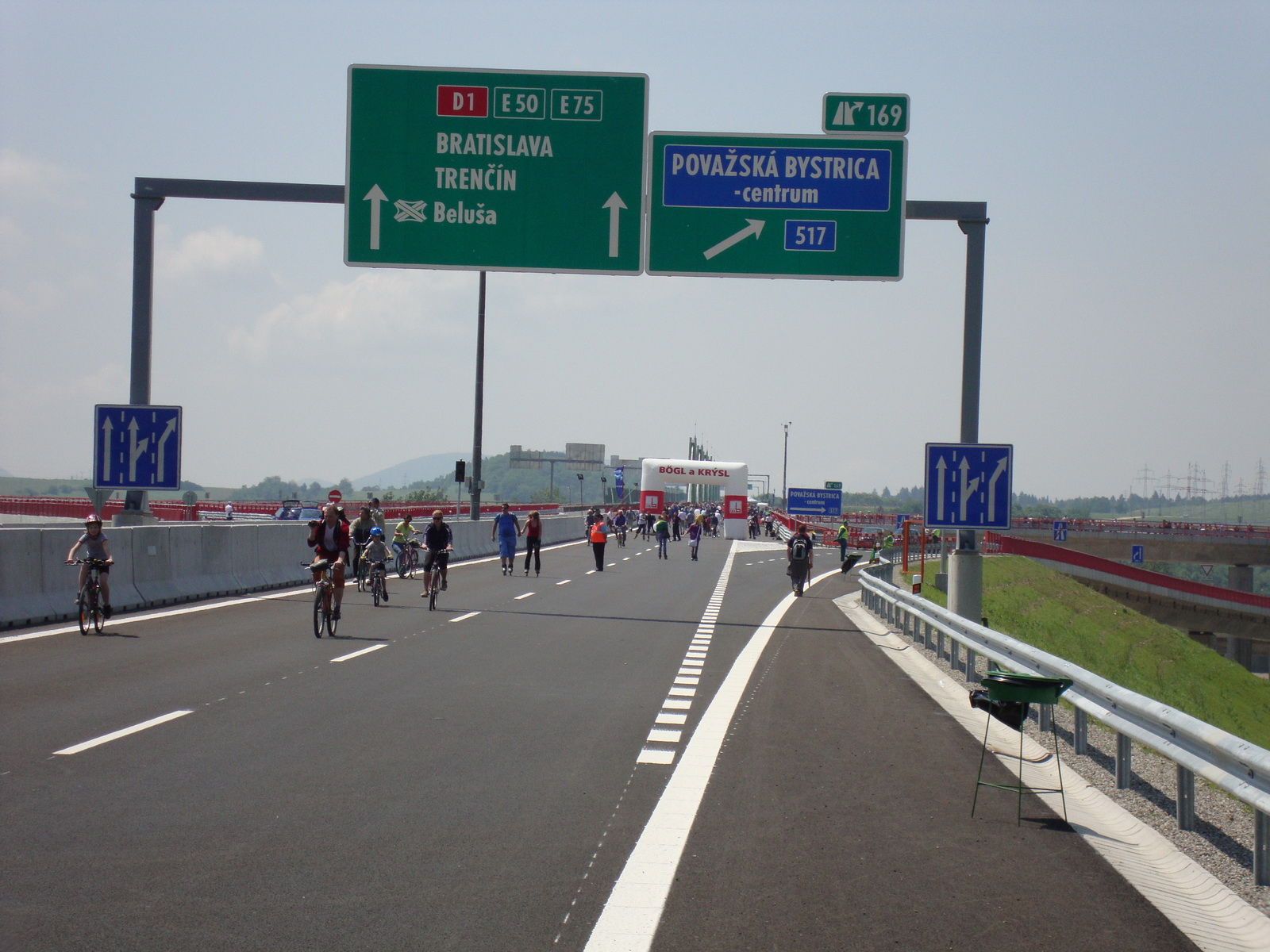
opening of the D1 motorway viaduct in Považská Bystrica

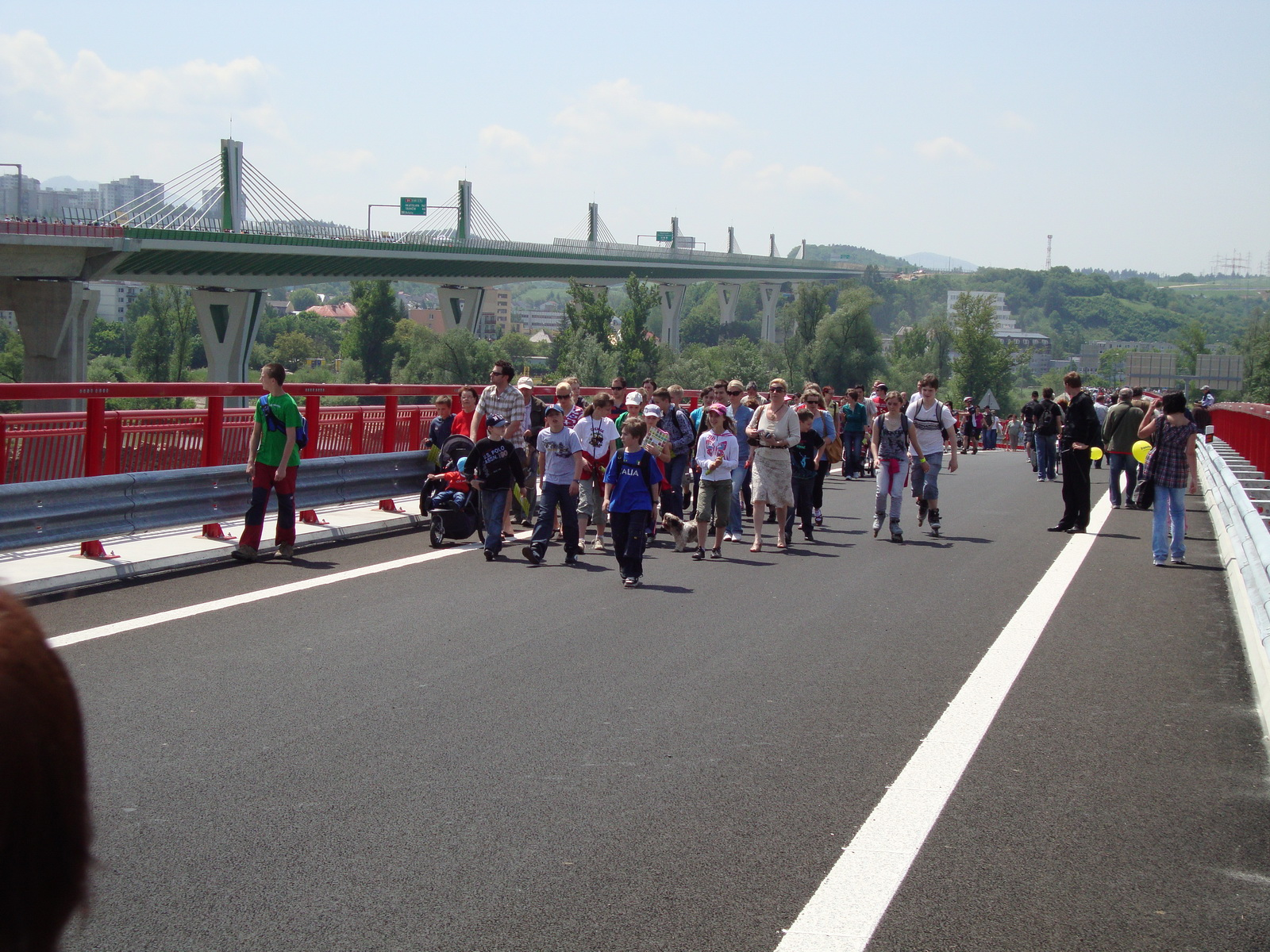
opening of the D1 motorway viaduct in Považská Bystrica

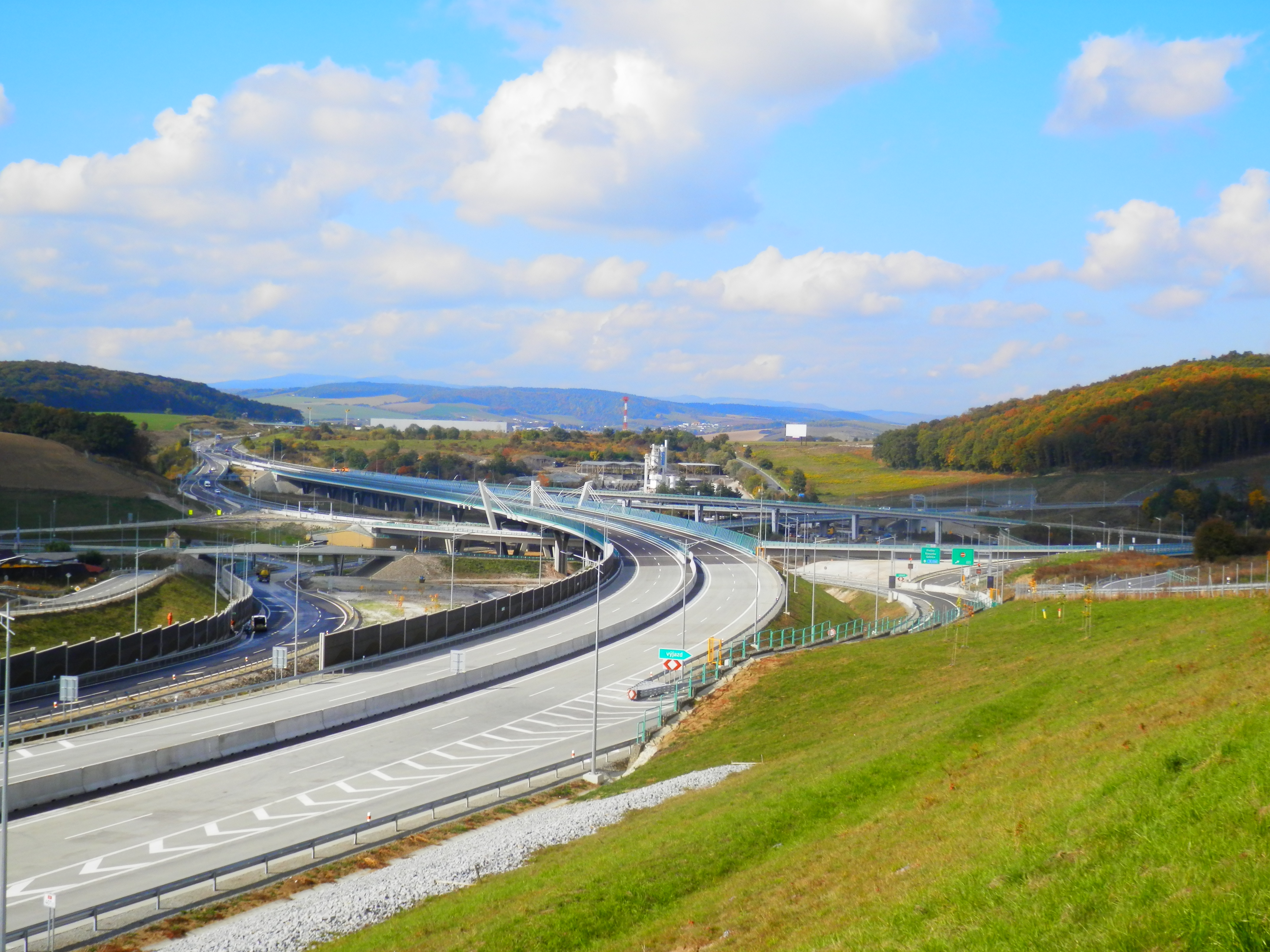
The D1 R4 intersection in Prešov west

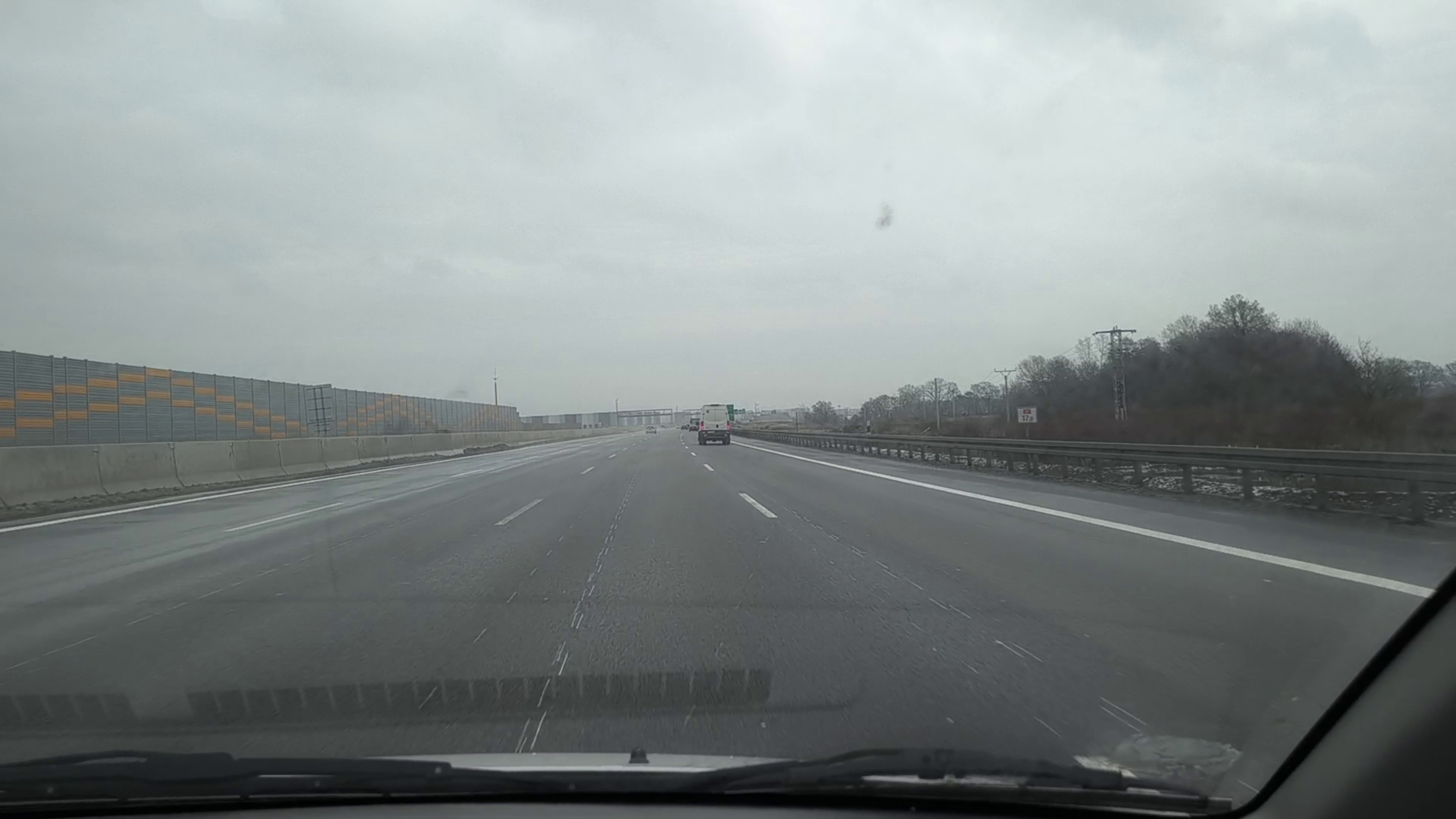
The D1 with 4 lanes on the 17th kilometer

== See also ==
- Motorway D61
