= ŠK Cementáreň Lietavská Lúčka =

Slovak football club

- Full name: ŠK Cementáreň Lietavská Lúčka
- Nickname(s): Cementári
- Founded: 1917
- Ground: Štadión Lietavská Lúčka, Lietavská Lúčka
- Capacity: 3,600
- Chairman: Stanislav Černobrad
- Manager: Pavol Šugár
- League: 1. trieda (6th division)
- 2015–16 5. Liga: 13th (relegated)

ŠK Cementáreň Lietavská Lúčka is a Slovak football team, based in the town of Lietavská Lúčka.
