= Podtureň Viaduct =

Coordinates: 49.0573°N 19.6963°E

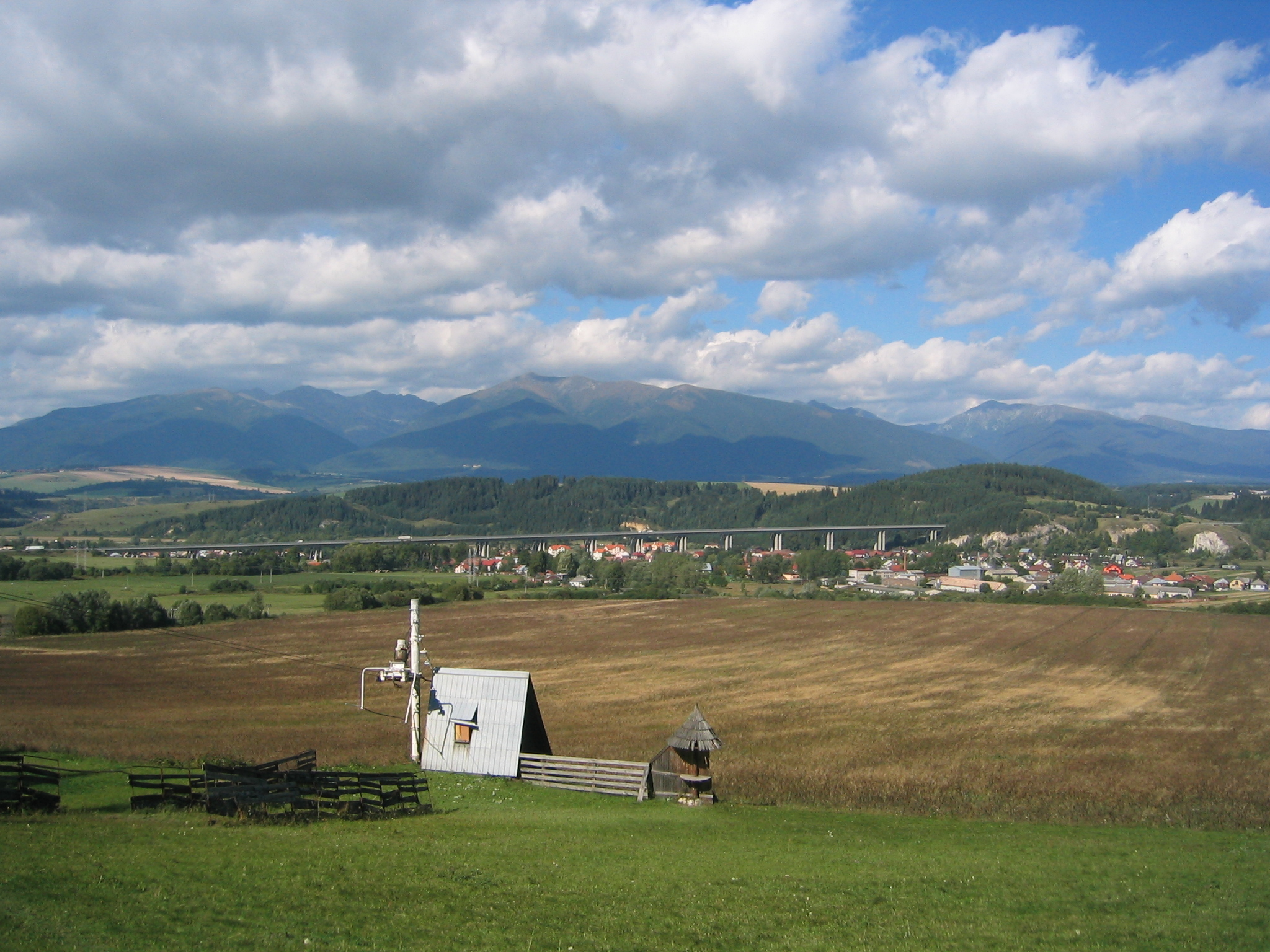
Podtureň viaduct

Podtureň Viaduct (Slovak: Most Podtureň/Viadukt Podtureň) is a 1,035-metre-long (3,396 ft) highway bridge in northern Slovakia, located on the D1 motorway, around 10 km east of Liptovský Mikuláš. It was built from 1975 to 1983. It spans the Váh river valley, several roads, main railway track and two villages of Uhorská Ves and Podtureň. The viaduct opened on 21 December 1983.
