= D1 motorway =

D1 motorway may refer to:

- D1 motorway (Czech Republic)
- D1 motorway (Slovakia)
