= D61 motorway (Slovakia) =

Road in Slovakia

The D61 motorway (Slovak: diaľnica D61) was a motorway in Slovakia, connecting Bratislava to Trenčín via Trnava. It was eventually merged with the D1 motorway.

Most of the D61 part of new D1 highway is still marked with old kilometres (except in some parts of Bratislava).

== Sections of the motorways ==
The motorway was first mentioned in plans in 1963 and its construction started in 1972 by constructing Bratislava - Senec section.

The sections were:

- Bratislava - SK/A border, (2,5 km, added to plan in 1987, now part of D4)
- Bratislava Viedenská street - Prístavný most (3,9 km, constructed and opened as a D1, opened 2005)
- Bratislava Prístavný most - Mierová street (3,5 km, open 1985)
- Bratislava Mierová street - Senecká street (6,5 km, constructed as D61, opened as D1, opened 2002)
- Bratislava Senecká street - Senec - (16,8 km, opened 1975)
- Senec - Trnava (19,3 km, opened 1978)
- Trnava - Hlohovec (18,5 km, opened 1982)
- Hlohovec - Piešťany (15,1 km, opened 1985)
- Piešťany - Horná Streda (8,3 km, opened 1988, last one opened during the Czechoslovakia)
- Horná Streda - Nové Mesto nad Váhom (14 km, opened in half-profile as a D61 in 1998, finished as the D1 motorway in full profile in 2000)
- Nové Mesto nad Váhom - Chocholná (15,3 km, opened in half-profile as a D61 in 1998, finished as the D1 motorway in full profile in 2000)

== See also ==
- D1 motorway (Slovakia)
- Prístavný most
