= D61 =

D61 may refer to:

- HMAS Swan (D61), a 1915 Royal Australian Navy River class torpedo boat destroyer
- HMS Calypso (D61), a 1917 British Royal Navy C class cruiser
- HMS Ilex (D61), a 1937 British Royal Navy I-class destroyer
- INS Delhi (D61), a 1995 Indian Navy Delhi class destroyer
- JNR Class D61, a Japanese steam locomotive converted from the JNR Class D51
- D61 motorway (Slovakia)
- SPS Churruca (D61), a 1972 Spanish Navy Gearing-class destroyer
- Queen's Gambit Declined, Encyclopaedia of Chess Openings code

and also :

- the ICD-10 code for other aplastic anaemias
