= Margecany tunnel =

Tunnel in Slovakia

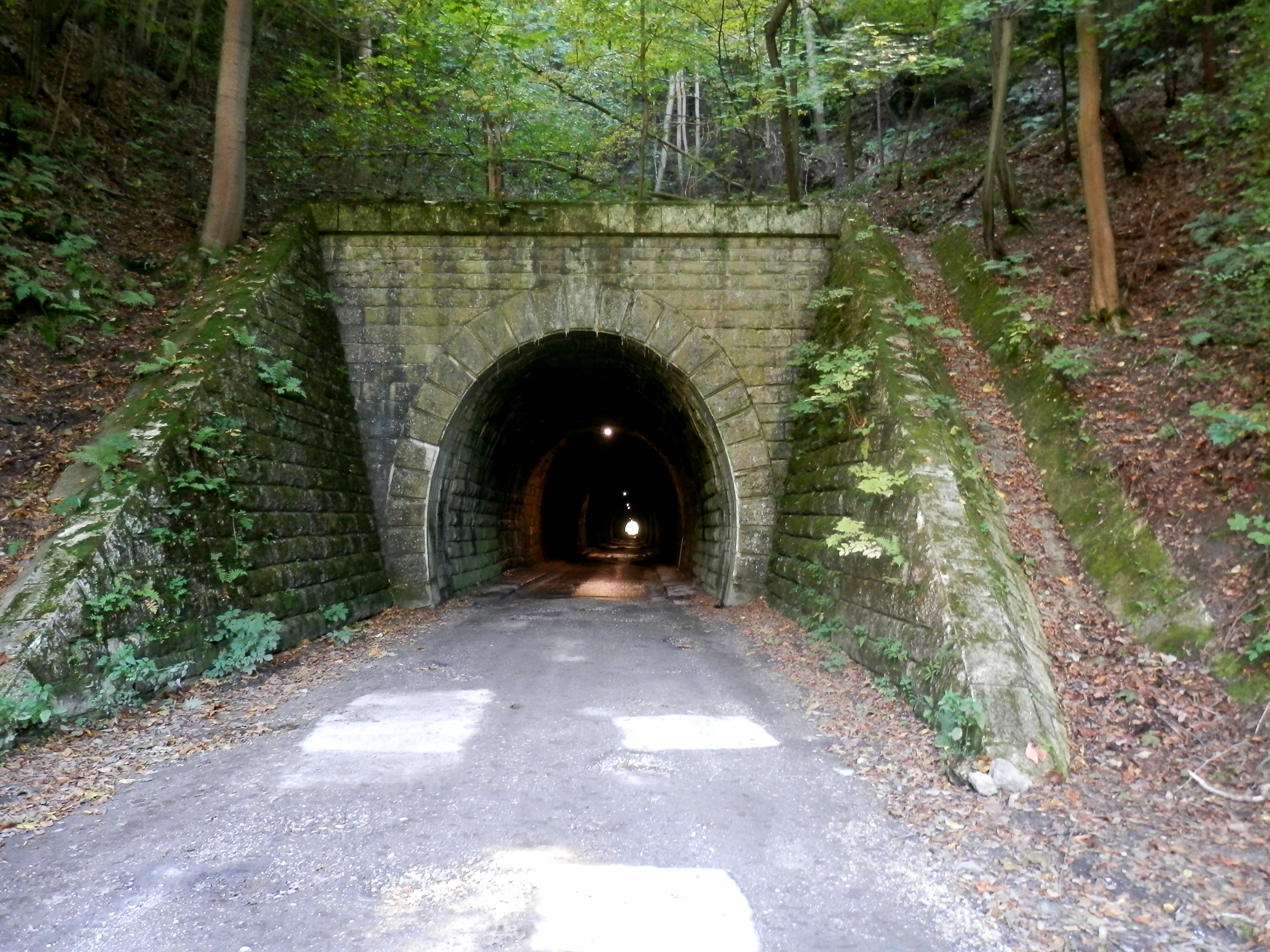
- Interactive map of Margecany tunnel

Overview
- Other name: Margeciansky tunel
- Location: Margecany, Košice Region, Slovakia
- Coordinates: 48.8845°N 21.0494°E

Technical
- Length: 431 m

The Margecany Tunnel (Slovak: Margeciansky tunel; also known as Rolovsky tunnel) is a tunnel located in the Hornád valley near the village of Margecany. It was originally built as a railway tunnel. It is currently an illuminated road tunnel and is served by a local purpose-built road.

== History ==
The tunnel was built between 1867 and 1872 as part of the construction of the Košice-Bohumín Railway as part of the most important railway line in northern Hungary. It served the railways until 1955, when the new Bujanovský Tunnel was put into operation. Since 1985, it has been registered as a technical monument in the Central List of Monuments of the Slovak Republic. In 2018, the municipality of Margecany implemented the project "Margecany Tunnel, Open Gallery".

== Description ==
The Margecian railway tunnel is 431 m long. It was dug in the hard rock of the Čierna Hora mountain range, and therefore almost half of its length consists of only processed rocks. The tunnel has two modified portals in the shape of a parabolic arch, a parabolic tunnel tube. The walled parts of the tunnel tube and the portals have a parabolic arch shape typical of tunnels. The material of the masonry blocks is mainly travertine. The road has a concrete base and is covered with asphalt. Since 2018, electric lighting has been installed in the tunnel along its entire length.

== See also ==
- List of tunnels in Slovakia
