= R6 expressway (Slovakia) =

Expressway in Slovakia

Expressway R6
- Rýchlostná cesta R6
- Completed Under construction Planned

Route information
- Length: 2.7 km (1.7 mi) Planned: 25.9 km (16.1 mi)

Major junctions
- From: D49 border with the Czech Republic (planned)
- To: D1 Púchov, South

Location
- Country: Slovakia
- Regions: Trenčín Region
- Major cities: Púchov

Highway system
- Highways in Slovakia
| ← R5 | → R7 |

Expressway R6 is an expressway in Slovakia, which after its completion will connect D1 (intersection Beluša) with Púchov and the border crossing to the Czech Republic at Lysá pod Makytou. It will be located in the corridor I/49 and will pass through slightly undulating terrain. At the border, the R6 road will be connected to the Czech highway D49. Both roads, R6 and D49 are included in the pan-European network of multimodal corridors TEN-T.

According to the current plans of the Ministry of Transport, no sections of the R6 road will be constructed or open until 2028. With regard to the current intentions of the Ministry of Transport, the operation of the expressway along the entire length of the route cannot be expected before the year 2050.
