= European route E571 =

Road in trans-European E-road network

E571

Route information
- Length: 403 km (250 mi)

Major junctions
- From: Bratislava
- Žiar nad Hronom; Zvolen
- To: Košice

Location
- Countries: Slovakia

Highway system
- International E-road network; A Class; B Class

E 571 is a B-class European route connecting Bratislava and Košice, the two most populous cities in Slovakia. The route is approximately 403 km long.

== Route and E-road junctions ==
- Slovakia (on shared signage D1 then R1 then I16, which is a Class 1 road undergoing upgrades to extend R2)
  - Bratislava: E58, E65, E75, E575
  - Žiar nad Hronom: E572
  - Zvolen: E77
  - Košice: E50, E58, E71
