= Vrtižer =

Coordinates: 49°09′N 18°28′E

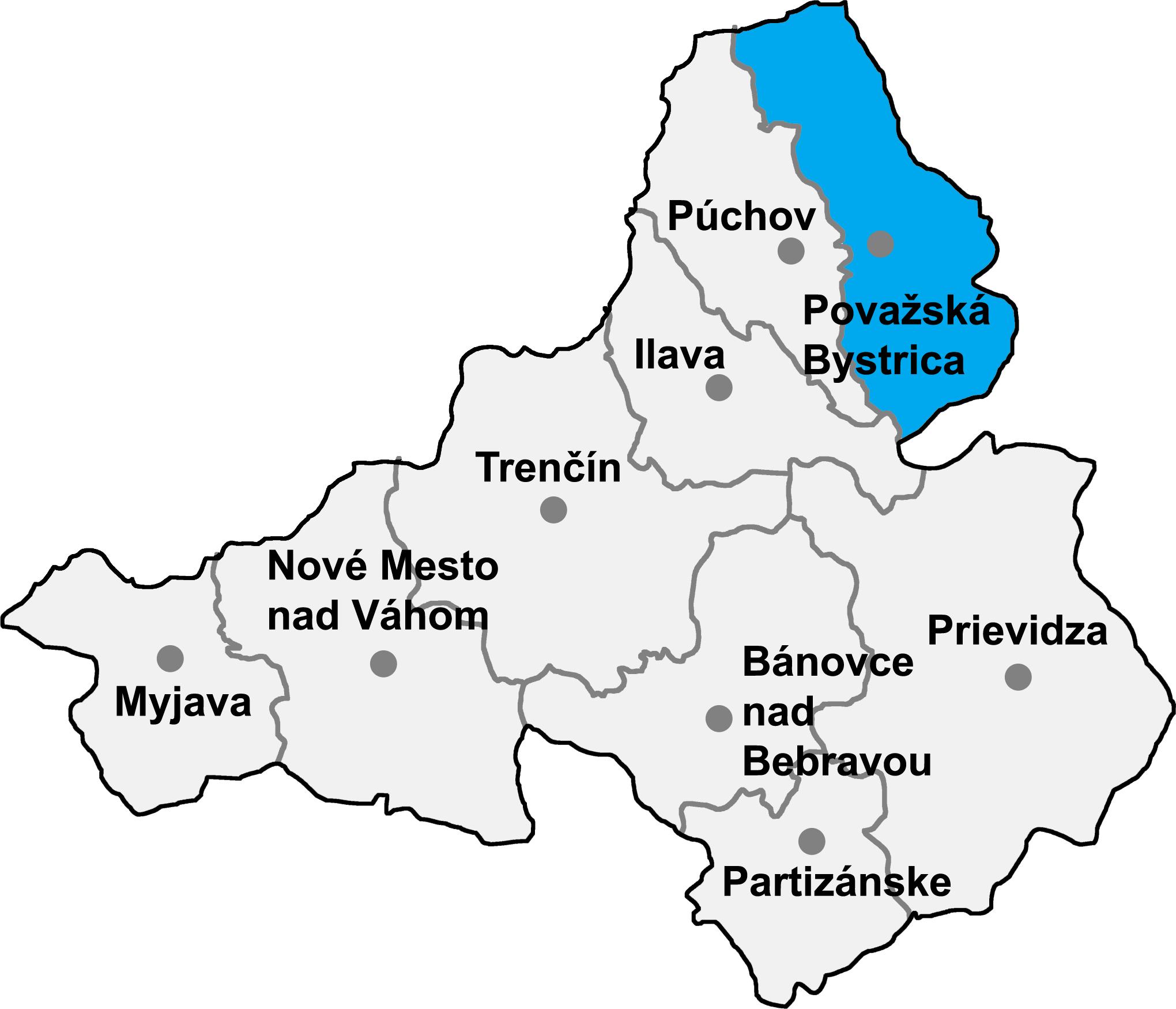
Považská Bystrica District in the Trenčín Region

Vrtižer (Hungarian: Kisfarkasd) is a city part of Považská Bystrica, in the Považská Bystrica District, Trenčín Region, Slovakia.

The Highway bridge of the D1 motorway between Vrtižer and Sverepec was opened to vehicle traffic 31 May 2010.
