= Višňové tunnel =

Motorway tunnel in Slovakia

Višnové tunnel
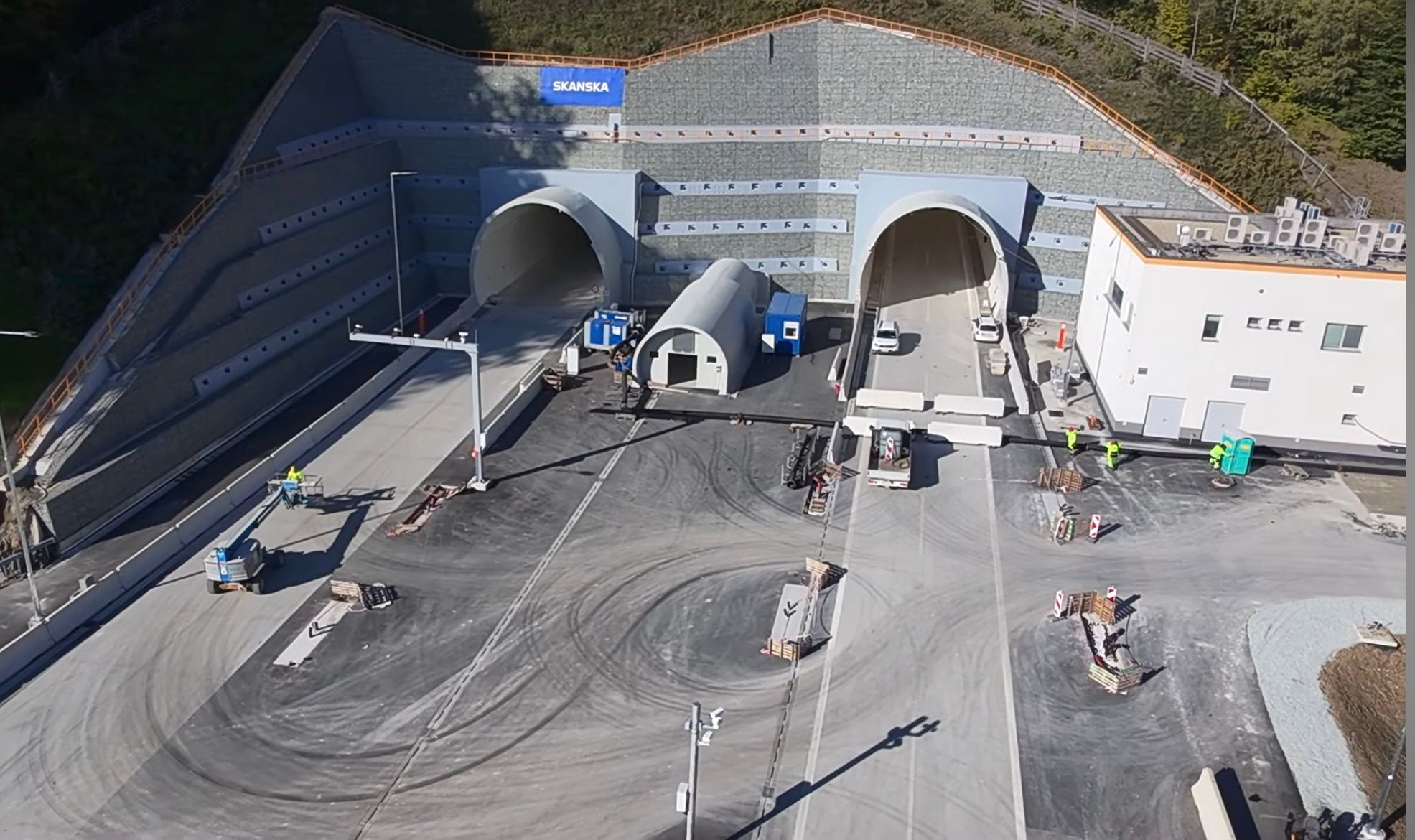
- The Višňové tunnel in October 2025
- Interactive map of Višnové tunnel

Overview
- Location: Žilina Region, Slovakia
- Coordinates: 49°08′34″N 18°48′42″E
- Status: Open
- Route: D1 motorway

Operation
- Work began: May 22, 1998
- Constructed: 2015–2019 (Dúha and Salini Impregilo); 2021–2025 (Skanska)
- Opened: December 22, 2025
- Owner: National Motorway Company
- Traffic: Automobile
- Toll: None - included with the vignette
- Vehicles per day: 20,000 (January 2026)

Technical
- Length: 7,500 m (24,600 ft)
- No. of lanes: 4 (2 in each direction)
- Operating speed: 100 km/h (62 mph)
- Max elevation: 1,300 m (4,300 ft)
- Min elevation: 800 m (2,600 ft)
- Tunnel clearance: 4.80 m (15.7 ft)
- Width: 7.5 m (25 ft)
- Grade: 2.29%

The Višňové tunnel (Slovak: tunel Višňové) is an automobile tunnel located on the D1 motorway segment between the cities of Lietavská Lúčka and Dubná Skala in Slovakia. With the length of 7,500 m (24,600 ft), it is the longest tunnel on the motorway and third longest in the country after the planned tunnels of Karpaty and Hradište. Its purpose is to ease off automobile traffic on the I/18 in the Žilina Region.

== Traffic intensity ==
It was reported that in the first month after the opening, the tunnel accumulated over 600,000 vehicles passing through it with average daily traffic of 20,000.

== Sources ==
Frankovský, Miloslav; Mitrenga, Petr (2016). "THE LONGEST SLOVAK TUNNEL, VIŠŇOVÉ, UNDER CONSTRUCTION" (PDF).
