= Margecany =

Margecany Margitfalva
- Municipality
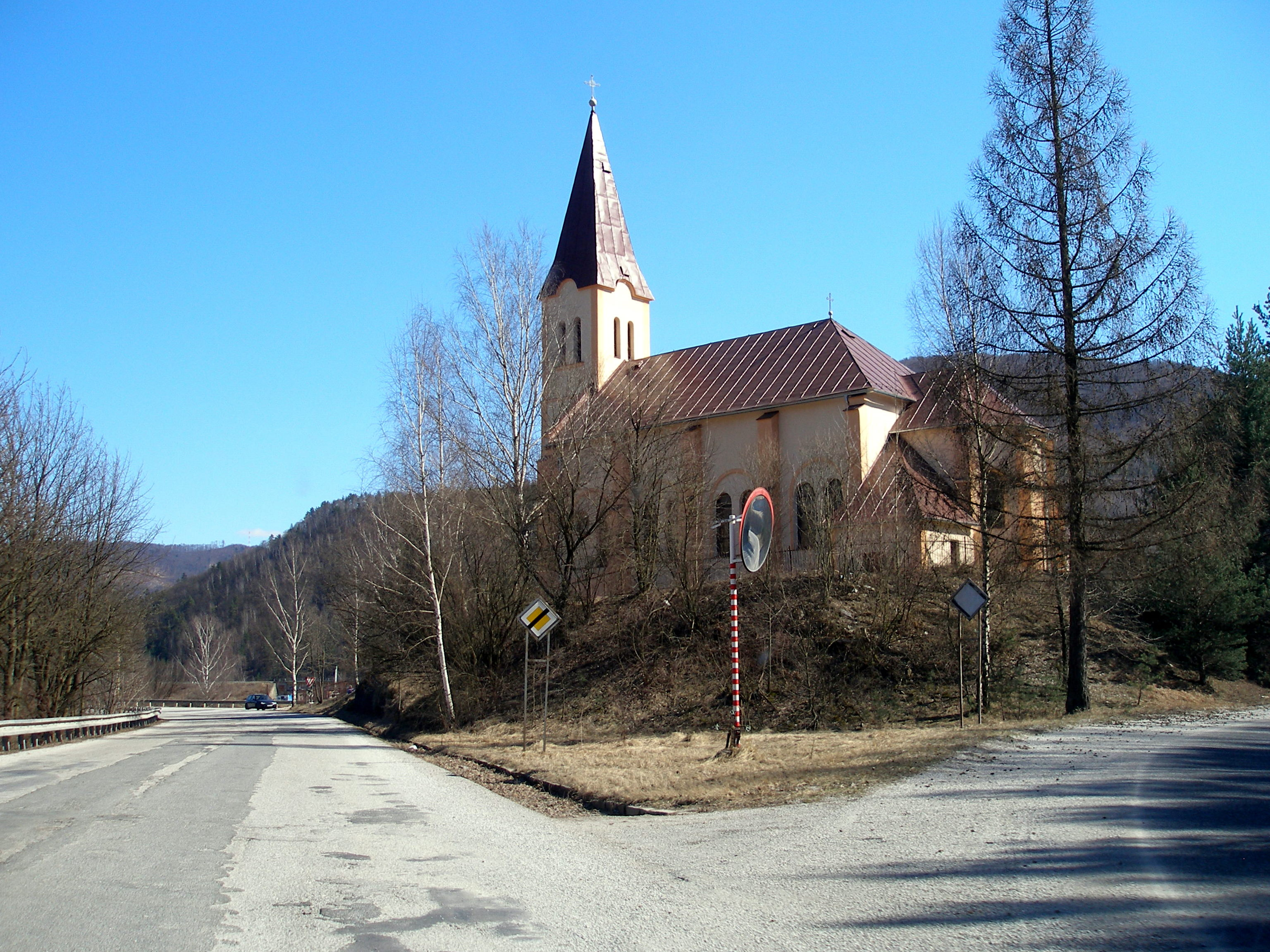
- Church of Saint Margaret of Antioch

- Flag

- Location of Margecany in the Košice Region Location of Margecany in Slovakia
- Coordinates: 48.87°N 21.07°E
- Country: Slovakia
- Region: Košice Region
- District: Gelnica District
- First mentioned: 1235

Area
  - Total: 17.62 km^{2} (6.80 sq mi)
- Elevation: 336 m (1,102 ft)

Population (2025)
  - Total: 1,856
- Time zone: UTC+1 (CET)
  - Summer (DST): UTC+2 (CEST)
- Postal code: 550 1
- Area code: +421 53
- Vehicle registration plate (until 2022): GL
- Website: www.margecany.sk

Margecany (Hungarian: Margitfalva, German: Margareten) is a village and municipality in the Gelnica District in the Košice Region of eastern Slovakia. Total municipality population was, in 2011, 1964 inhabitants. Margecany is a very important railway junction situated on the main railway corridor (Košice–Bohumín Railway) connecting Košice with Žilina and Bratislava. Ružín reservoir regulates rivers Hornád and Hnilec. Technical attraction is the Bujanov tunnel.

== Geography ==
The municipality lies at an altitude of 336 metres (1,102 ft) and covers an area of 17.62 km^{2} (6.80 sq mi) (2025).

== Population ==
Population statistic (10 years)
Year	1995	2005	2015	2025
Count	2093	2013	1954	1856
Difference		−3.82%	−2.93%	−5.01%

Population statistic
Year	2024	2025
Count	1833	1856
Difference		+1.25%

It has a population of 1856 people (31 December 2025).

=== Ethnicity ===
Census 2021 (1+ %)
Ethnicity	Number	Fraction
Slovak	1846	98.4%
Not found out	31	1.65%
Total	1876	

In year 2021 was 1876 people by ethnicity 1846 as Slovak, 31 as Not found out, 9 as Czech, 8 as Rusyn, 5 as Other, 3 as Romani, 2 as Hungarian, 1 as Irish, 1 as Ukrainian, 1 as Italian, 1 as German and 1 as Greek.

Note on population: The difference values of population numbers in the table "Population statistic" and in the sections "Ethnicity" & "Religion" is caused by the use of various statistical methods.

=== Religion ===
Census 2021 (1+ %)
Religion	Number	Fraction
Roman Catholic Church	1423	75.85%
None	295	15.72%
Greek Catholic Church	50	2.67%
Not found out	42	2.24%
Evangelical Church	24	1.28%
Total	1876	

In year 2021 was 1876 people by religion 1423 from Roman Catholic Church, 295 from None, 50 from Greek Catholic Church, 42 from Not found out, 24 from Evangelical Church, 13 from Jehovah's Witnesses, 5 from Eastern Orthodox Church, 5 from Christian Congregations in Slovakia, 5 from Ad hoc movements, 4 from Other, 3 from Calvinist Church, 3 from Other and not ascertained christian church, 1 from Paganism and natural spirituality, 1 from Islam, 1 from Czechoslovak Hussite Church and 1 from Buddhism.

== See also ==
- Bujanov Tunnel
- Margecany tunnel
