= Harmanec Tunnel =

Railway tunnel in Slovakia

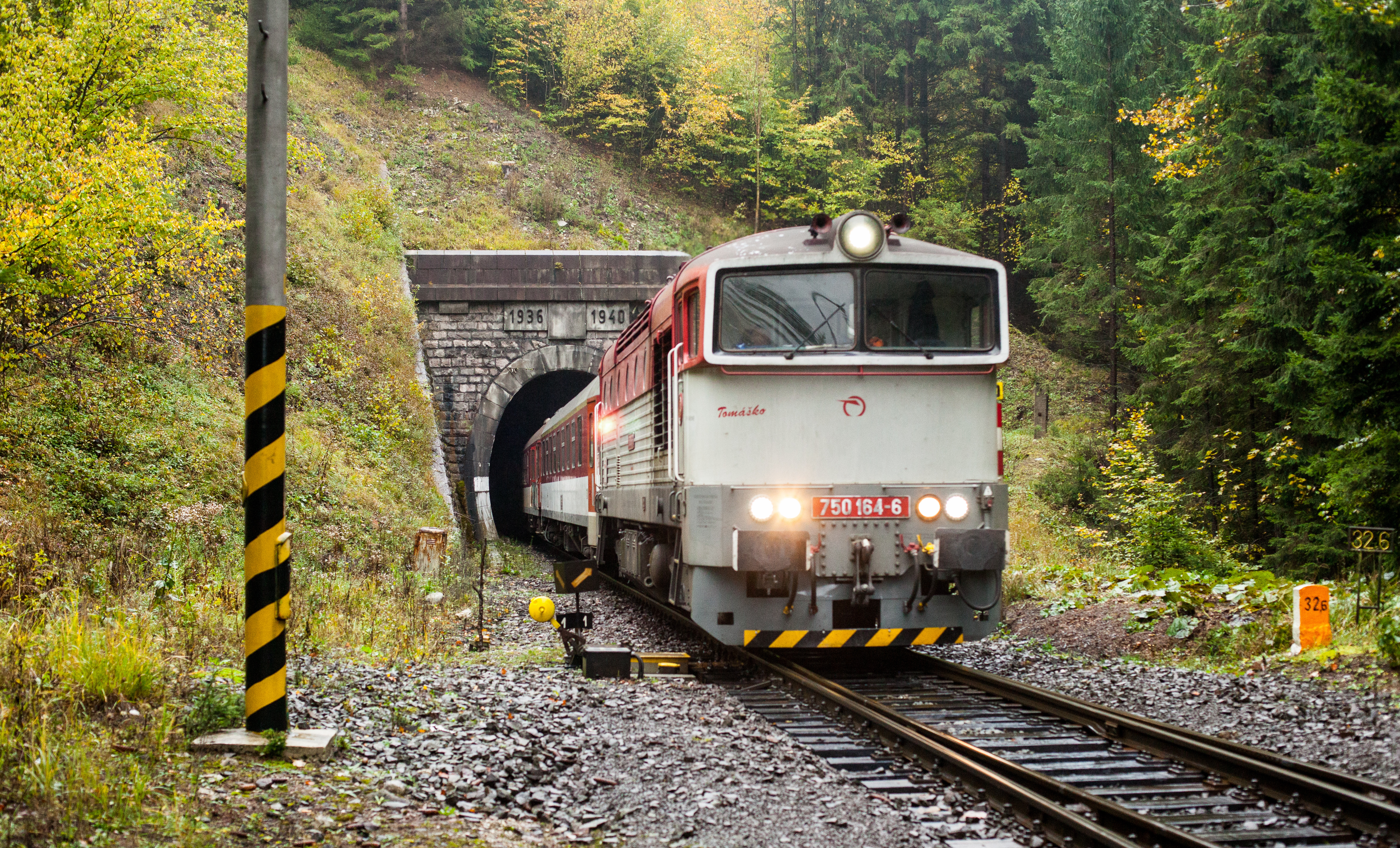
- Interactive map of Harmanec Tunnel

Overview
- Official name: Čremošniansky tunel
- Location: Slovakia
- Coordinates: 48°50′22″N 18°57′24″E

Operation
- Work began: September 28, 1936
- Opened: December 19, 1940
- Operator: ŽSR
- Traffic: train

Technical
- Length: 4,698 m (15,413 ft)
- No. of tracks: Single

The Harmanec Tunnel (Slovak: Čremošniansky tunel) is a railway tunnel on the Banská Bystrica — Dolná Štubňa railway. It is 4,698 m (15,413 ft) long and it is the longest railway tunnel in Slovakia. It was built from 1936 to 1940.

== See also ==
- Bujanov Tunnel

== Sources ==
- On the ridge of the Greater Fatra
