= Bujanov Tunnel =

Railway tunnel in Slovakia

Coordinates: 48°52′49″N 21°04′15″E

The Bujanov Tunnel (Slovak: Bujanovský tunel) is the longest double track railway tunnel in Slovakia, on the Margecany-Košice route. It is 3,411 m (11,191 ft) long and is the second longest railway tunnel in Slovakia after the Harmanec Tunnel. It was opened in 1955.

== History ==
During the electrification and extension of the Košice-Bohumín railway to the double-track družby line, the construction of a tunnel under the Bujanov hill was started in the early 1950s. Running the important line through a 3,410.7 m long tunnel was supposed to significantly speed up traffic in the difficult section, where, in addition, the construction of the Ružín dam, necessary for the ironworks under construction near Košice, was envisaged.

Complex geological conditions, difficult terrain and underestimation of the preparation meant that the construction was prolonged and the opening of the entire družby line was postponed, and the unrealistic opening date of 1952 finally became 1955. The tunnel was built using a modified Austrian tunnelling method and the Belgian - undercutting method, which greatly accelerated the delayed construction. The cost of the construction of the two-way tunnel eventually reached 370 million crowns and together with the Margecany - Košice section it was put into use on 5 November 1955.
