= Lučivná Tunnel =

Tunnel in Slovakia

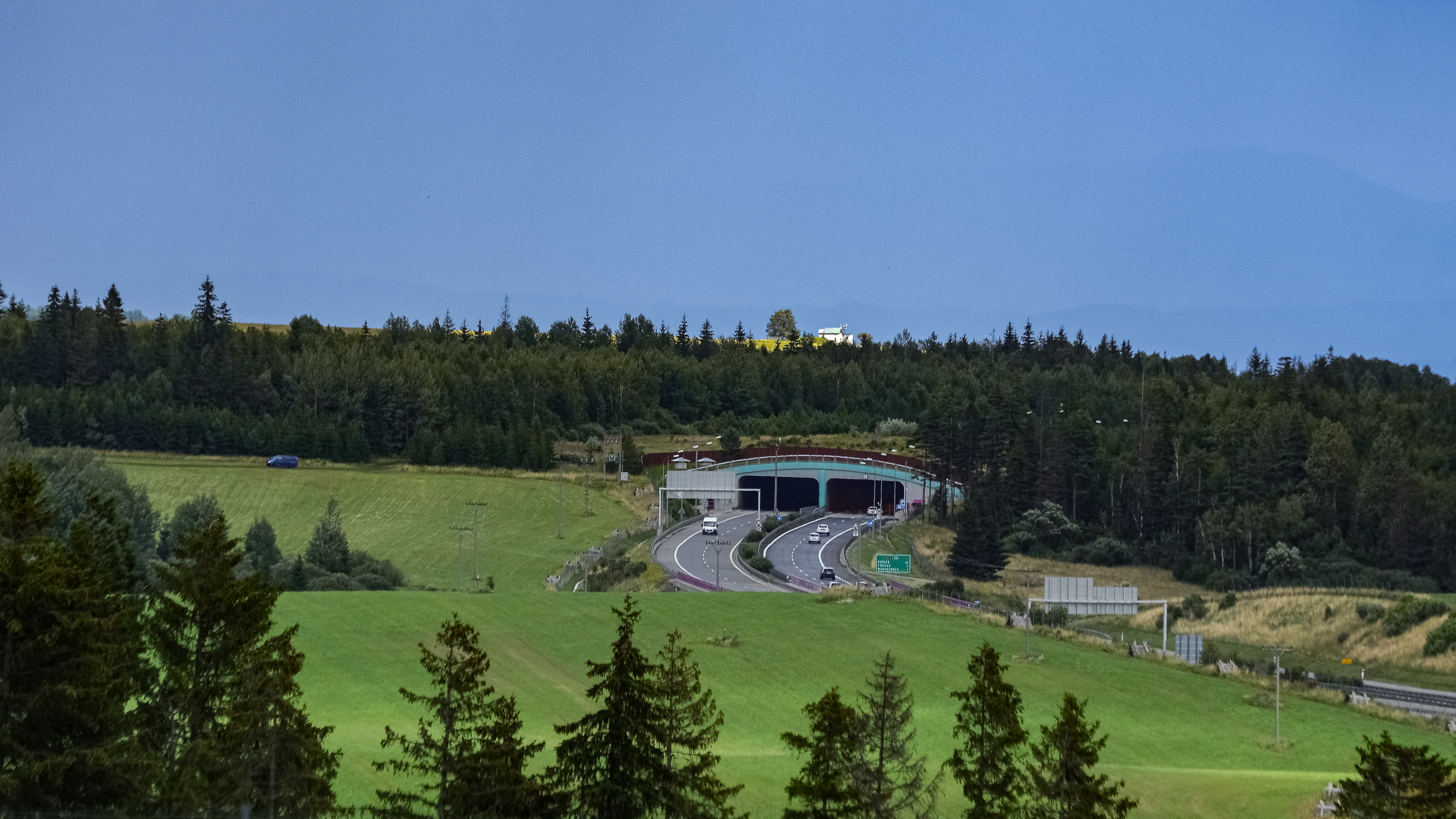
- West portal of the Lučivná Tunnel
- Interactive map of Lučivná Tunnel

Overview
- Location: Slovakia
- Coordinates: 49°04′17.41″N 20°06′13.05″E
- Status: Open
- Route: D1
- Start: Lučivná, Slovakia (east)
- End: Lučivná, Slovakia (west)

Operation
- Constructed: 2005-2007
- Opened: December 11, 2007
- Owner: Slovakia
- Operator: Národná diaľničná spoločnosť
- Traffic: Automotive
- Toll: none - included in the mandatory vignette

Technical
- Length: 250 metres (820 ft)
- No. of lanes: 4 (2 in each tube)
- Operating speed: 130 km/h (81 mph)
- Max elevation: 860 m (2,820 ft) (east portal)
- Min elevation: 860 m (2,820 ft) (west portal)

The Lučivná Tunnel is a short covered tunnel in northern Slovakia, on the D1 motorway between Štrba and Mengusovce. Its construction started in 2005 and was open in 2007. Its purpose is to provide a safe crossing for wild animals.
