= Ivachnová =

Village and municipality in Slovakia

- Municipality
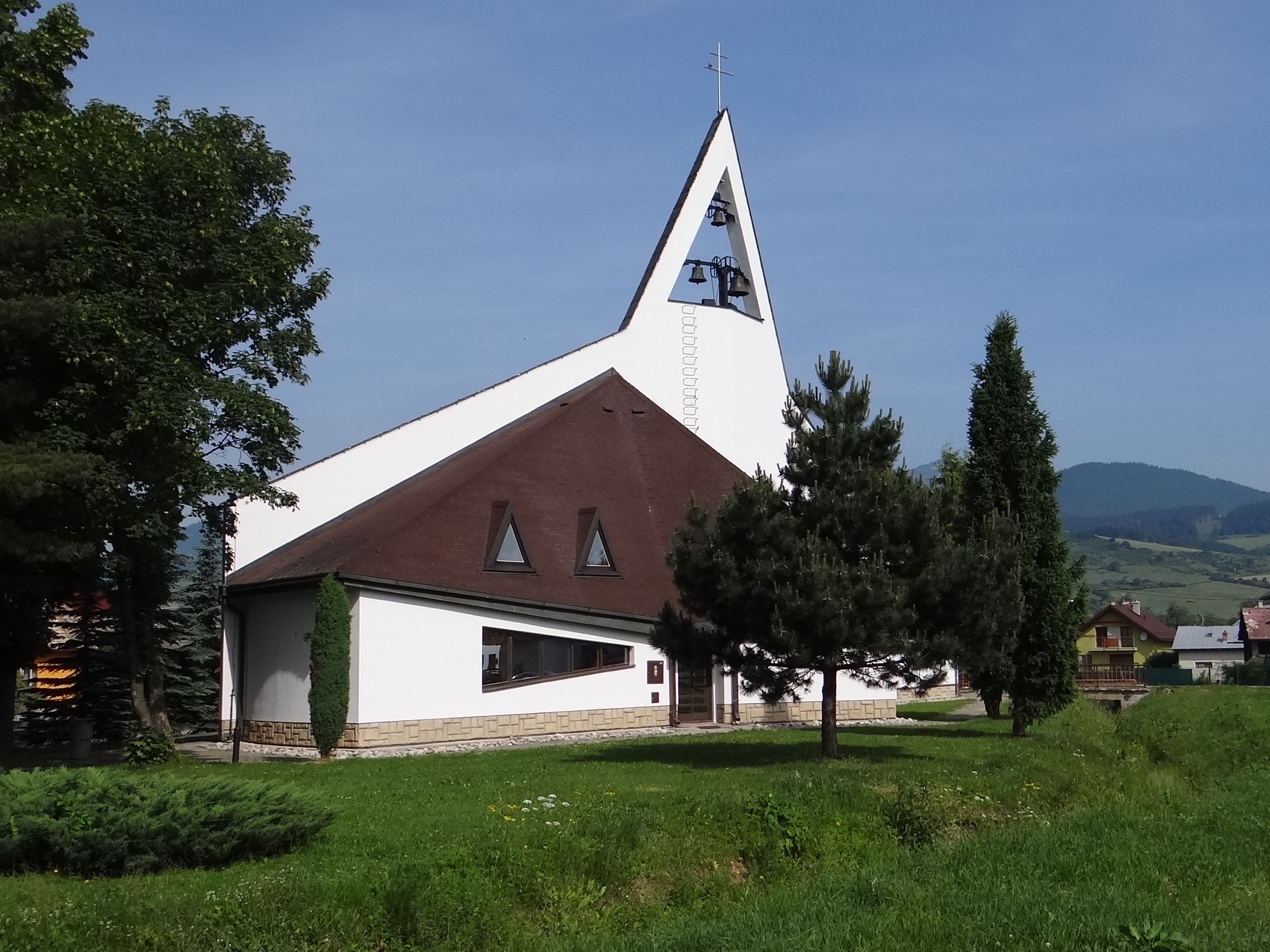

- Flag

- Location of Ivachnová in the Žilina Region Location of Ivachnová in Slovakia
- Coordinates: 49.10°N 19.42°E
- Country: Slovakia
- Region: Žilina Region
- District: Ružomberok District
- First mentioned: 1469

Area
  - Total: 5.89 km^{2} (2.27 sq mi)
- Elevation: 503 m (1,650 ft)

Population (2025)
  - Total: 772
- Time zone: UTC+1 (CET)
  - Summer (DST): UTC+2 (CEST)
- Postal code: 348 3
- Area code: +421 44
- Vehicle registration plate (until 2022): RK
- Website: www.obecivachnova.sk

Ivachnová (Hungarian: Ivachnófalu) is a village and a municipality in Ružomberok District in the Žilina Region of northern Slovakia.

== History ==
In historical records, the village was first mentioned in 1469.

== Geography ==
The municipality lies at an altitude of 503 metres (1,650 ft) and covers an area of 5.89 km^{2} (2.27 sq mi) (2025).

== Population ==
Population statistic (10 years)
| Year | 1995 | 2005 | 2015 | 2025 |
|---|---|---|---|---|
| Count | 473 | 505 | 595 | 772 |
| Difference | | +6.76% | +17.82% | +29.74% |

Population statistic
| Year | 2024 | 2025 |
|---|---|---|
| Count | 760 | 772 |
| Difference | | +1.57% |

It has a population of 772 people (31 December 2025).

=== Ethnicity ===
Census 2021 (1+ %)
| Ethnicity | Number | Fraction |
|---|---|---|
| Slovak | 662 | 97.35% |
| Not found out | 15 | 2.2% |
| Czech | 9 | 1.32% |
| Total | 680 | |

In year 2021 was 680 people by ethnicity 662 as Slovak, 15 as Not found out, 9 as Czech, 1 as Jewish, 1 as Vietnamese, 1 as Moravian and 1 as Other.

Note on population: The difference values of population numbers in the table "Population statistic" and in the sections "Ethnicity" & "Religion" is caused by the use of various statistical methods.

=== Religion ===
Census 2021 (1+ %)
| Religion | Number | Fraction |
|---|---|---|
| Roman Catholic Church | 519 | 76.32% |
| None | 103 | 15.15% |
| Not found out | 18 | 2.65% |
| Evangelical Church | 15 | 2.21% |
| Jehovah's Witnesses | 8 | 1.18% |
| Total | 680 | |

In year 2021 was 680 people by religion 519 from Roman Catholic Church, 103 from None, 18 from Not found out, 15 from Evangelical Church, 8 from Jehovah's Witnesses, 6 from Greek Catholic Church, 4 from United Methodist Church, 3 from Ad hoc movements, 1 from Old Catholic Church, 1 from Other, 1 from Hinduism and 1 from Buddhism.

== Genealogical records ==
The records for genealogical research are available at the state archive "Statny Archiv in Bytca, Slovakia".

- Roman Catholic church records (births/marriages/deaths): 1687-1901 (parish B)
- Lutheran church records (births/marriages/deaths): 1783-1895 (parish B)

== See also ==
- List of municipalities and towns in Slovakia
