= Ovčiarsko Tunnel =

Road tunnel in Slovakia

Coordinates: 49°12′58″N 18°39′51″E

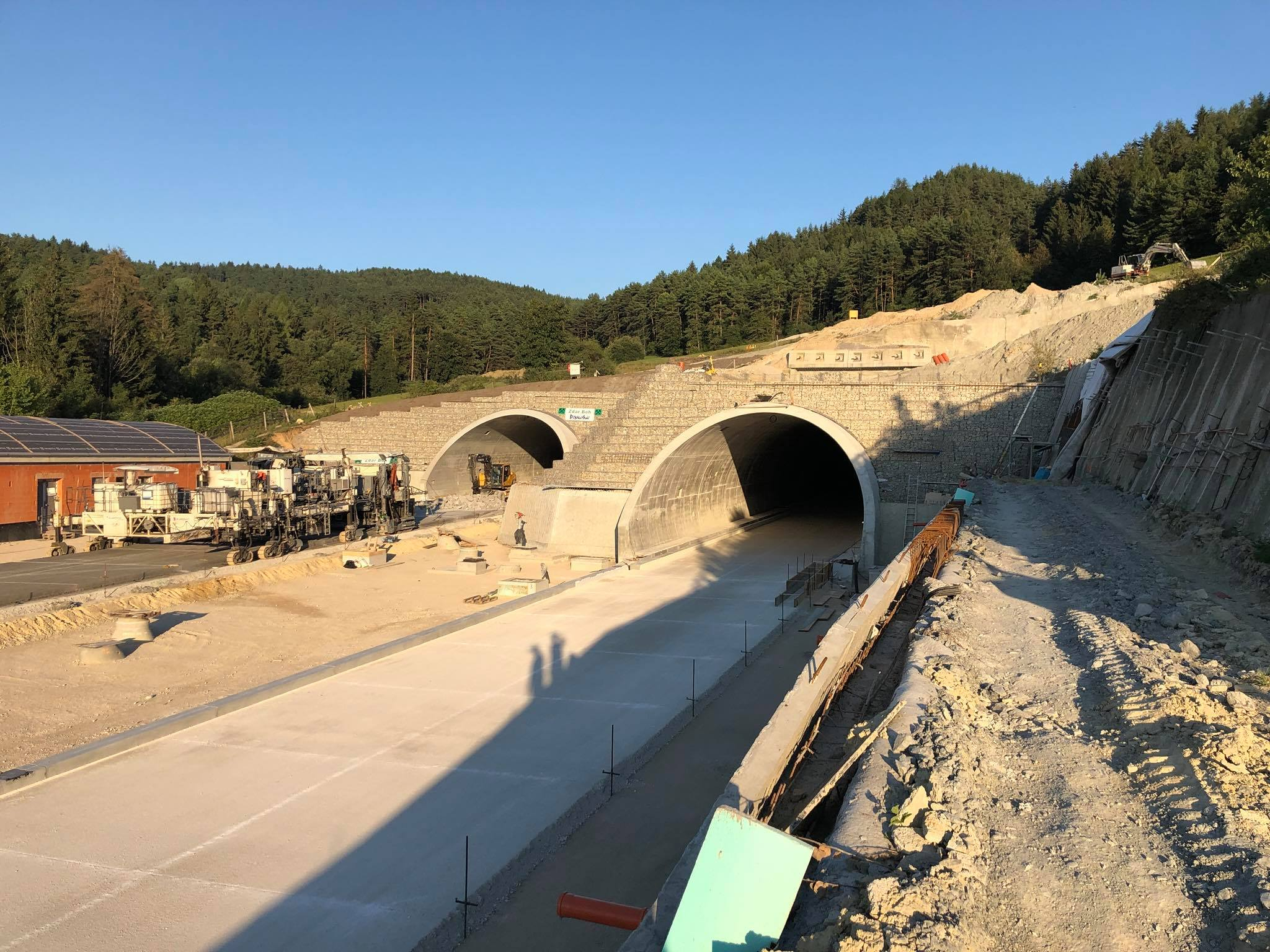
Ovciarsko.

Ovčiarsko Tunnel is a highway tunnel in northern Slovakia near Žilina, on the D1 highway. The tunnel is 2,367 m long in the south and 2,360 m in the north. The tunnel passes below the Lesser Fatra Mountain Range, connecting Žilina with Vrútky and points south and east. It runs parallel to the Váh River while bypassing a winding gorge of the river through the mountains.

An exploration gallery was driven from 1996 to 1998. Originally, the tunnel was planned to be built with all southern Žilina's bypass between 2010 and 2014 as a PPP project. But the new Iveta Radičova's executive cancelled it in 2010 and made a decision to be financed by EU funds and the state budget. The construction started in July 2014 and the north tube was pierced in April 2016. The general contractor of the tunnel was Uranpres.

Having been planned for October 2018, the opening of the tunnel took place on 29 January 2021.
