= Prístavný most =

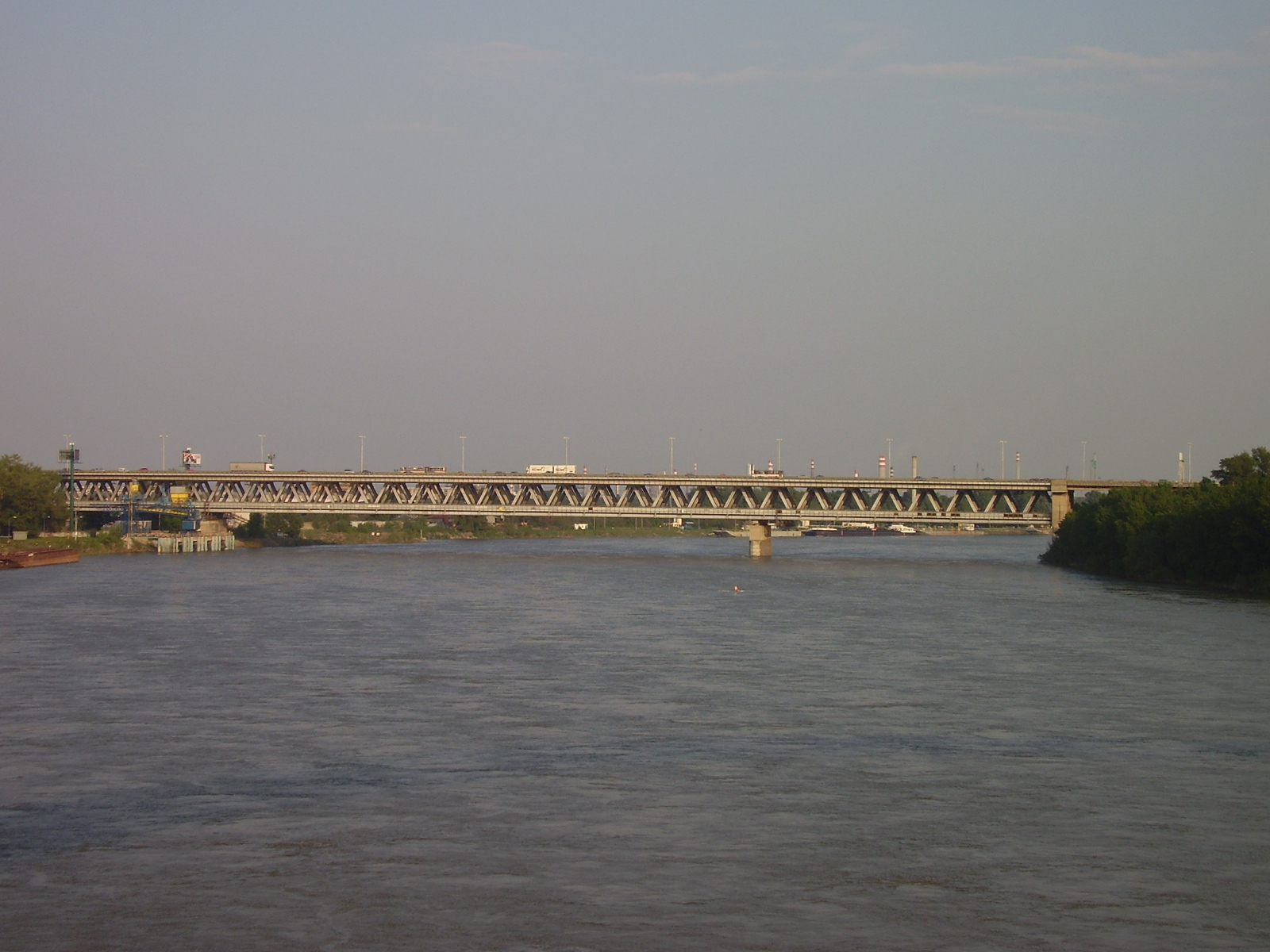
- Prístavný most from the Apollo Bridge
- Coordinates: 48.1348°N 17.1407°E
- Carries: D1
- Crosses: Danube
- Locale: Bratislava
- Begins: Ružinov
- Ends: Petržalka
- Structurae ID: 267780

Characteristics
- Total length: 599 metres (1,965 ft)
- No. of lanes: 4
- Capacity: 60,000/

History
- Construction start: 1977
- Construction end: 1985
- Opened: 1985

Statistics
- Daily traffic: 120,000

Location
- Interactive map of Prístavný most

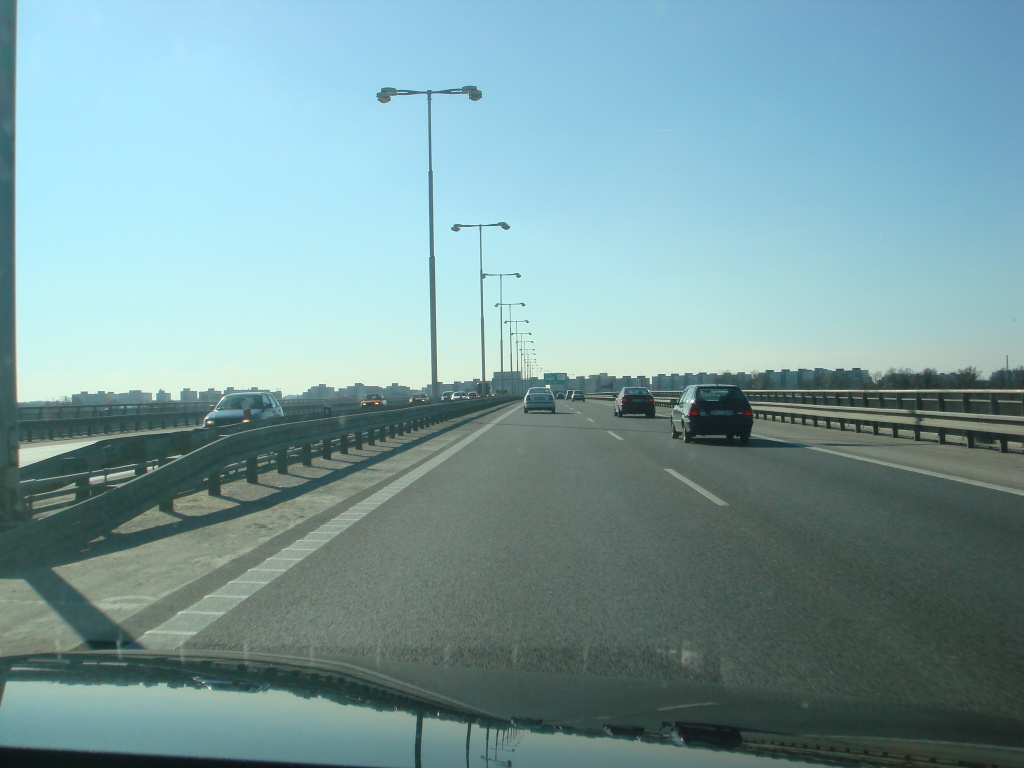
Prístavný most, view toward Petržalka

Prístavný most (literally BrE: Harbour Bridge or AmE: Harbor Bridge, until 1993 known as Most hrdinov Dukly or Dukla Heroes' Bridge) is a double-floor motorway-railroad truss bridge over the Danube in Bratislava, Slovakia, near the Port of Bratislava. It lies on the D1 motorway. It is a 599 m-long (1,965 ft) (1080 m with access roads) bridge (over the Danube part), and was built between 1977 and 1985. There are also pathways for pedestrians and cyclists on the bridge.

Today, the bridge suffers from heavy traffic because it is a route for many commuters from Petržalka, and due to the lack of an outer circle around the city it is also a route for transfer traffic. The situation improved slightly after the opening of the nearby Apollo Bridge in 2005. Traffic jams are common around the bridge and they occur regularly at the end of each week and after traffic accidents. The bridge was built to handle around 60,000 vehicles/day, but current traffic consists of around 120,000 vehicles/day and it is rising.

== See also ==
- History of Bratislava
