= European route E572 =

Road in trans-European E-road network

E572

Route information
- Length: 101 km (63 mi)

Major junctions
- From: Trenčín
- To: Žiar nad Hronom

Location
- Countries: Slovakia

Highway system
- International E-road network; A Class; B Class

E 572 is a B-class European route connecting Trenčín in Slovakia to Žiar nad Hronom. The route is approximately 101 km long.

== Route and E-road junctions ==
- Slovakia (on shared signage I9 (includes interspersed sections upgraded to R2) then I65)
  - Trenčín: E50, E75
  - Žiar nad Hronom: E58, E571
