= Horná Streda =

- Municipality
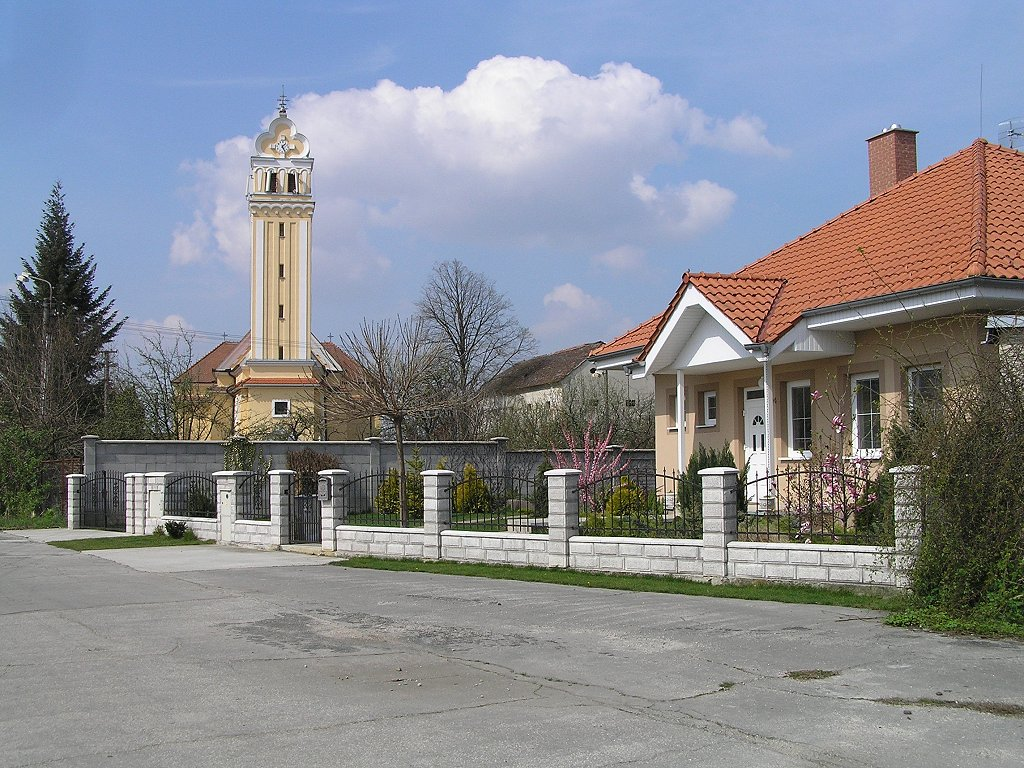
- Church of All Saints

- Flag

- Location of Horná Streda in the Trenčín Region Location of Horná Streda in Slovakia
- Coordinates: 48.66°N 17.84°E
- Country: Slovakia
- Region: Trenčín Region
- District: Nové Mesto nad Váhom District
- First mentioned: 1263

Area
  - Total: 9.82 km^{2} (3.79 sq mi)
- Elevation: 169 m (554 ft)

Population (2025)
  - Total: 1,440
- Time zone: UTC+1 (CET)
  - Summer (DST): UTC+2 (CEST)
- Postal code: 916 24
- Area code: +421 32
- Vehicle registration plate (until 2022): NM
- Website: www.hornastreda.sk

Horná Streda (Hungarian: Felsőszerdahely, known as Vág-Szerdahely before 1898) is a village and municipality in Nové Mesto nad Váhom District in the Trenčín Region of western Slovakia.

== History ==
In historical records the village was first mentioned in 1263.

Prior to 1918 it was part of Nyitra County, Austria-Hungary. It then became part of the First Czechoslovak Republic. From 1939 to 1945, it was part of the Slovak Republic.

== Geography ==
The municipality lies at an altitude of 169 metres (554 ft) and covers an area of 9.82 km^{2} (3.79 sq mi) (2025). The village lies about 7 km north of Piešťany and approximately 12 km south of Nové Mesto nad Váhom. Horná Streda is about an hour's drive away from Bratislava, the capital of Slovakia.

The village lies on the banks of the river Váh and is the site of a small hydroelectric power plant.

== Population ==
Population statistic (10 years)
Year	1995	2005	2015	2025
Count	1304	1263	1375	1440
Difference		−3.14%	+8.86%	+4.72%

Population statistic
Year	2024	2025
Count	1420	1440
Difference		+1.40%

It has a population of 1440 people (31 December 2025).

=== Ethnicity ===
Census 2021 (1+ %)
Ethnicity	Number	Fraction
Slovak	1346	97.25%
Not found out	32	2.31%
Total	1384	

In year 2021 was 1384 people by ethnicity 1346 as Slovak, 32 as Not found out, 10 as Czech, 4 as Romani, 3 as Serbian, 3 as Bulgarian, 2 as Other, 1 as Ukrainian, 1 as Romanian, 1 as Hungarian, 1 as Canadian and 1 as English.

Note on population: The difference values of population numbers in the table "Population statistic" and in the sections "Ethnicity" & "Religion" is caused by the use of various statistical methods.

=== Religion ===
Census 2021 (1+ %)
Religion	Number	Fraction
Roman Catholic Church	1053	76.08%
None	227	16.4%
Not found out	44	3.18%
Evangelical Church	29	2.1%
Total	1384	

In year 2021 was 1384 people by religion 1053 from Roman Catholic Church, 227 from None, 44 from Not found out, 29 from Evangelical Church, 8 from Greek Catholic Church, 5 from Christian Congregations in Slovakia, 5 from Ad hoc movements, 3 from Eastern Orthodox Church, 3 from Jehovah's Witnesses, 2 from Hinduism, 1 from Calvinist Church, 1 from Paganism and natural spirituality, 1 from Islam, 1 from Other and 1 from United Methodist Church.

== Genealogical resources ==
The records for genealogical research are available at the state archive "Statny Archiv in Bratislava, Slovakia"

- Roman Catholic church records (births/marriages/deaths): 1735-1919 (parish A)
- Lutheran church records (births/marriages/deaths): 1871-1922 (parish B)

== See also ==
- List of municipalities and towns in Slovakia
