= Podtureň =

- Municipality
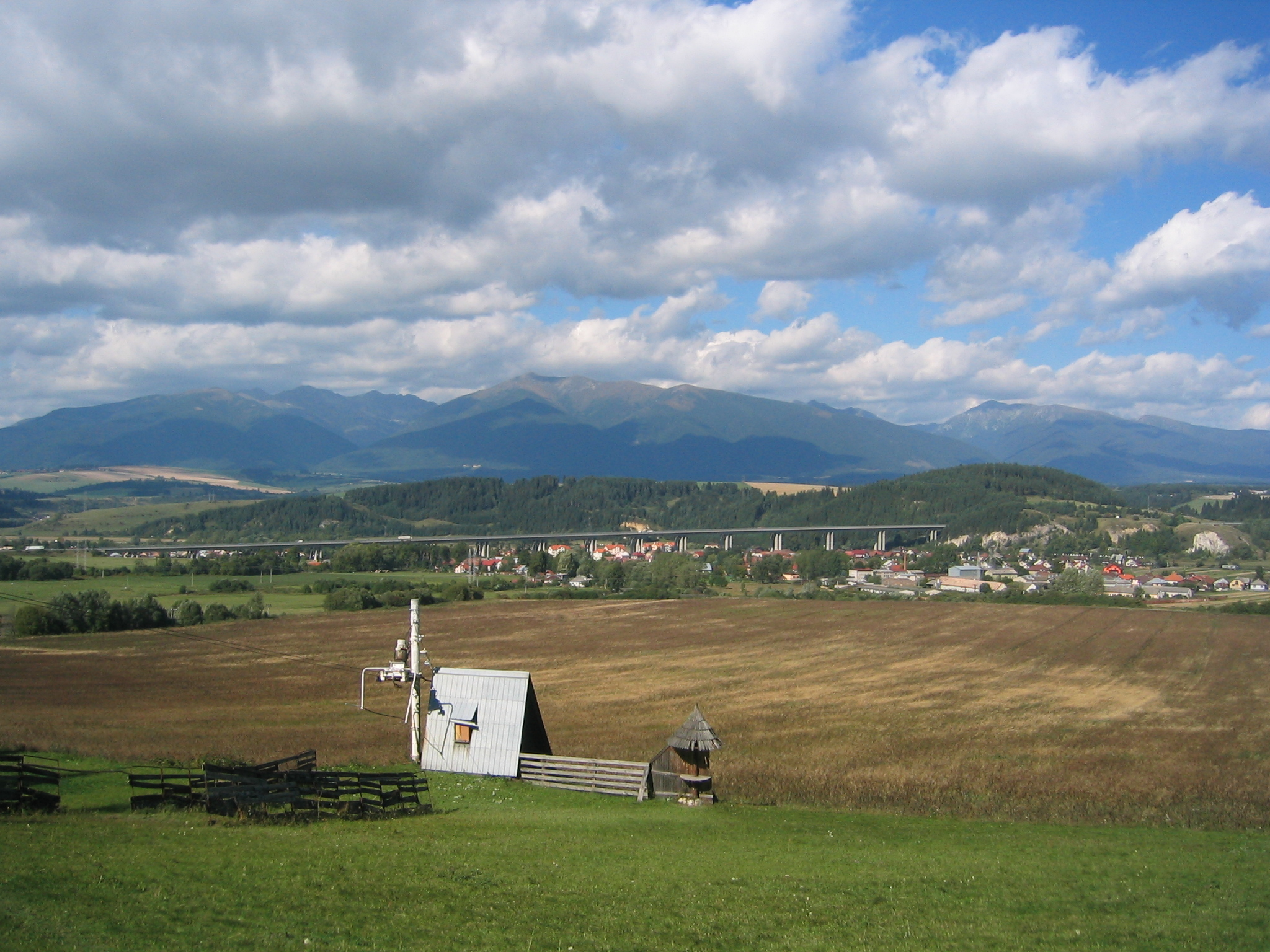

- Flag

- Location of Podtureň in the Žilina Region Location of Podtureň in Slovakia
- Coordinates: 49.05°N 19.70°E
- Country: Slovakia
- Region: Žilina Region
- District: Liptovský Mikuláš District
- First mentioned: 1345

Area
  - Total: 5.08 km^{2} (1.96 sq mi)
- Elevation: 620 m (2,030 ft)

Population (2025)
  - Total: 1,062
- Time zone: UTC+1 (CET)
  - Summer (DST): UTC+2 (CEST)
- Postal code: 330 1
- Area code: +421 44
- Vehicle registration plate (until 2022): LM
- Website: www.podturen.sk

Podtureň (Hungarian: Pottornya) is a village and municipality in Liptovský Mikuláš District in the Žilina Region of northern Slovakia.

== History ==
In historical records the village was first mentioned in 1345. Before the establishment of independent Czechoslovakia in 1918, it was part of Liptó County within the Kingdom of Hungary. From 1939 to 1945, it was part of the Slovak Republic.

== Geography ==
The municipality lies at an altitude of 620 metres (2,030 ft) and covers an area of 5.08 km^{2} (1.96 sq mi) (2025).

== Population ==
Population statistic (10 years)
Year	1995	2005	2015	2025
Count	434	582	1041	1062
Difference		+34.10%	+78.86%	+2.01%

Population statistic
Year	2024	2025
Count	1055	1062
Difference		+0.66%

It has a population of 1062 people (31 December 2025).

=== Ethnicity ===
Census 2021 (1+ %)
Ethnicity	Number	Fraction
Slovak	1050	95.97%
Not found out	32	2.92%
Czech	13	1.18%
Total	1094	

In year 2021 was 1094 people by ethnicity 1050 as Slovak, 32 as Not found out, 13 as Czech, 2 as Moravian, 2 as Other, 1 as Vietnamese, 1 as Ukrainian, 1 as Turkish and 1 as Hungarian.

Note on population: The difference values of population numbers in the table "Population statistic" and in the sections "Ethnicity" & "Religion" is caused by the use of various statistical methods.

=== Religion ===
Census 2021 (1+ %)
Religion	Number	Fraction
None	417	38.12%
Roman Catholic Church	308	28.15%
Evangelical Church	285	26.05%
Not found out	41	3.75%
Greek Catholic Church	17	1.55%
Total	1094	

In year 2021 was 1094 people by religion 417 from None, 308 from Roman Catholic Church, 285 from Evangelical Church, 41 from Not found out, 17 from Greek Catholic Church, 7 from Other, 5 from Other and not ascertained christian church, 4 from Ad hoc movements, 2 from Eastern Orthodox Church, 2 from Buddhism, 1 from Jewish community, 1 from Paganism and natural spirituality, 1 from Christian Congregations in Slovakia, 1 from Islam, 1 from Seventh-day Adventist Church and 1 from Baptists Church.
