= Lietavská Lúčka =

- Municipality
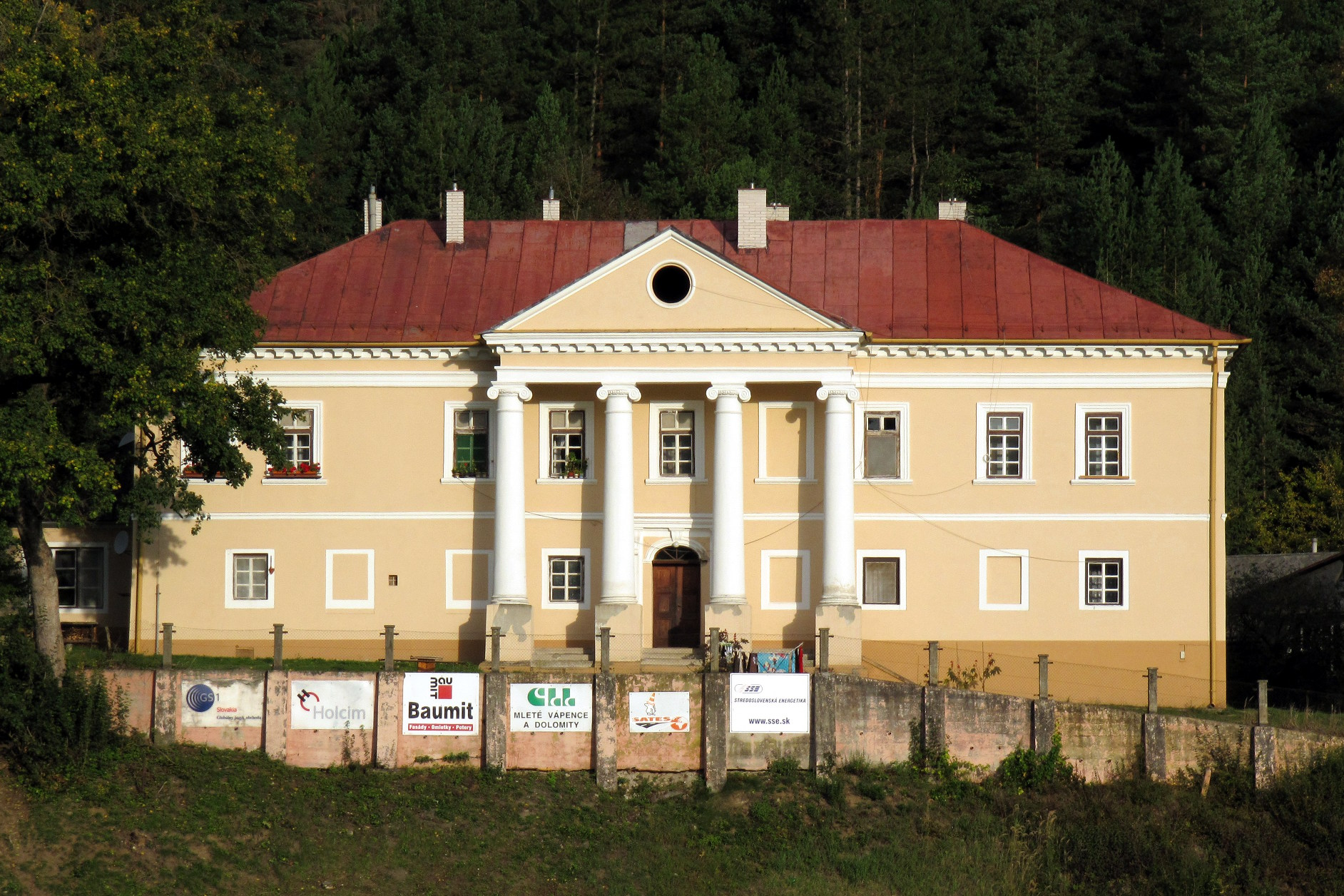

- Flag

- Location of Lietavská Lúčka in the Žilina Region Location of Lietavská Lúčka in Slovakia
- Coordinates: 49.17°N 18.72°E
- Country: Slovakia
- Region: Žilina Region
- District: Žilina District
- First mentioned: 1393

Area
  - Total: 6.49 km^{2} (2.51 sq mi)
- Elevation: 363 m (1,191 ft)

Population (2025)
  - Total: 1,869
- Time zone: UTC+1 (CET)
  - Summer (DST): UTC+2 (CEST)
- Postal code: 131 1
- Area code: +421 41
- Vehicle registration plate (until 2022): ZA
- Website: www.lietavskalucka.sk

Lietavská Lúčka (Hungarian: Litvailló) is a village and municipality in Žilina District in the Žilina Region of northern Slovakia.

== History ==
In historical records the village was first mentioned in 1393.

== Geography ==
The municipality lies at an altitude of 363 metres (1,191 ft) and covers an area of 6.49 km^{2} (2.51 sq mi) (2025). It has a large gender imbalance with women outnumbering men almost 2 to 1.

== Population ==
Population statistic (10 years)
Year	1995	2005	2015	2025
Count	1789	1768	1779	1869
Difference		−1.17%	+0.62%	+5.05%

Population statistic
Year	2024	2025
Count	1873	1869
Difference		−0.21%

It has a population of 1869 people (31 December 2025).

=== Ethnicity ===
Census 2021 (1+ %)
Ethnicity	Number	Fraction
Slovak	1806	96.16%
Not found out	73	3.88%
Total	1878	

In year 2021 was 1878 people by ethnicity 1806 as Slovak, 73 as Not found out, 9 as Czech, 4 as Jewish, 4 as Romani, 4 as Other, 3 as Russian, 3 as Polish, 3 as German, 3 as Greek, 2 as Serbian, 1 as Vietnamese, 1 as Ukrainian, 1 as Hungarian and 1 as Canadian.

Note on population: The difference values of population numbers in the table "Population statistic" and in the sections "Ethnicity" & "Religion" is caused by the use of various statistical methods.

=== Religion ===
Census 2021 (1+ %)
Religion	Number	Fraction
Roman Catholic Church	1278	68.05%
None	460	24.49%
Not found out	66	3.51%
Evangelical Church	28	1.49%
Total	1878	

In year 2021 was 1878 people by religion 1278 from Roman Catholic Church, 460 from None, 66 from Not found out, 28 from Evangelical Church, 8 from Ad hoc movements, 6 from Calvinist Church, 6 from Christian Congregations in Slovakia, 6 from Other, 4 from Old Catholic Church, 4 from Greek Catholic Church, 4 from Buddhism, 2 from Eastern Orthodox Church, 1 from Jewish community, 1 from Paganism and natural spirituality, 1 from Islam, 1 from United Methodist Church, 1 from Seventh-day Adventist Church and 1 from Apostolic Church.
