= International Children's Games =

International Olympic Committee-sanctioned multi-sport event

- The logo from 2001-present.
- Status: Active
- Genre: Sporting event
- Frequency: Annual (summer); Irregular (winter)
- Location: Various
- Inaugurated: 1968 (summer); 1994 (winter)
- Founder: Metod Klemenc
- Organiser: International Children's Games Committee (ICGC)
- Website: Official website

The International Children's Games (ICG) is an International Olympic Committee-sanctioned event held every year where children from cities around the world and between the ages of 12 and 15 participate in a variety of sports and cultural activities.

== History ==
International Children's Games former logo (1974-2001)

The Slovenian sports instructor Metod Klemenc founded the International Children's Games in 1968 with the aim of promoting peace and friendship through sports to the world's youth. He organised the first International Children's Games and Cultural Festival in 1968 in Yugoslavia with the participation of teams from nine European cities.

Since that time, 37,000 children aged 12 to 15 have been in competition at 47 Summer Games and 6 Winter Games. 411 different cities, 86 countries and all 5 continents have participated. The International Children's Games and Cultural Festival has become the world's largest international multi-sport youth games, and is a recognised member of the International Olympic Committee since 1990.

1,600 boys and girls between the ages of 12 and 15 from 70 cities in 37 countries participate in this competition every year.

The most recent edition of the International Children's Games was held in León, Mexico from July 15–20, 2024.

== Editions ==
=== Summer Games ===
Games	Year	Host city	Host nation	Nations	Sports	Ref
1	1968	Celje	Yugoslavia	7	1	
2	1970	Udine	Italy	5	2	
3	1972	Graz	Austria			
4	1974	Murska Sobota	Yugoslavia			
5	1974	Darmstadt	West Germany			
6	1976	Murska Sobota	Yugoslavia			
7	1976	Geneva	Switzerland			
8	1978	Ravne na Koroškem	Yugoslavia			
9	1980	Lausanne	Switzerland			
10	1982	Darmstadt	West Germany	10	3	
11	1983	Troyes	France	6	4	
12	1983	Murska Sobota	Yugoslavia	4	3	
13	1984	Geneva	Switzerland	11	4	
14	1985	Granollers	Spain	7	4	
15	1986	Lausanne	Switzerland	6	4	
16	1987	Graz	Austria	16	4	
17	1988	Szombathely	Hungary	13	4	
18	1989	Andorra	Andorra	12	4	
19	1990	Uzhhorod	Soviet Union	17	4	
20	1991	Bratislava	Slovakia	9	3	
21	1992	Geneva	Switzerland	13	3	
22	1993	Darmstadt	Germany	17	3	
23	1994	Hamilton, Ontario	Canada	22	3	
24	1994	Slovenj Gradec	Slovenia	5	3	
25	1995	Celje	Slovenia	5	3	
26	1996	Sopron	Hungary	12	3	
27	1997	Sparta	Greece	20	3	
28	1998	Logroño	Spain	23	3	
29	1999	Mediaș	Romania	13	3	
30	1999	Velenje	Slovenia	5	3	
31	1999	Český Krumlov	Czech Republic			
32	2000	Hamilton	Canada	26	9	
33	2001	Szombathely	Hungary	25	5	
34	2002	Płock	Poland	27	3	
35	2002	Taipei	Taiwan			
36	2003	Graz	Austria	29	7	
37	2003	Patras	Greece	19	6	
38	2004	Cleveland	United States	53	10	
39	2005	Coventry	England	33	5	
40	2006	Bangkok	Thailand	38	10	
41	2007	Reykjavík	Iceland	36	7	
42	2008	San Francisco	United States	45	8	
43	2009	Athens	Greece	37	7	
44	2010	Manama	Bahrain	33	8	
45	2011	Lanarkshire	Scotland	34	9	
46	2012	Daegu	South Korea	35	7	
47	2013	Windsor, Ontario	Canada	34	8	
48	2014	Lake Macquarie	Australia	32	8	
49	2015	Alkmaar	Netherlands	36	9	
50	2016	New Taipei	Taiwan			
51	2017	Kaunas	Lithuania	36	8	
52	2018	Jerusalem	Israel	29	8	
53	2019	Ufa	Russia	29	9	
54	2022 (Note: Originally scheduled to be held in Kecskemét, Hungary from 30 June–5 July 2020 but were cancelled due to the COVID-19 pandemic.)	Coventry	United Kingdom		7	
55	2023 (Note: Originally scheduled to be held in 2021 but were postponed due to the COVID-19 pandemic.)	Daegu	South Korea		8	
56	2024	León	Mexico		7	
57	2025	Tallinn	Estonia	29	7	
58	2026	Hualien	Taiwan			
59	2027	Olympia and Elis	Greece			
60	2028	Hamilton	Canada			
61	2029	Mumbai and Pune	India			

=== Winter Games ===
Games	Year	Host city	Host nation	Nations	Sports	Ref
1	1994	Ravne na Koroškem	Slovenia			
2	1995	Prakovce and Helcmanovce	Slovakia			
3	1999	Maribor	Slovenia			
4	2009	Montreux and Vevey	Switzerland			
5	2011	Kelowna	Canada			
6	2013	Ufa	Russia			
7	2016	Innsbruck	Austria			
8	2019	Lake Placid	United States			
-	2023 (cancelled)	Pyeongchang	South Korea			
9	2028	Bariloche and Las Leñas	Argentina			

=== Regional Games ===
Pan-American Children's Games

Games	Year	Host city	Host nation	Nations	Sports	Ref
1	2027	Miami	United States			

Asia-Pacific Children's Games

Games	Year	Host city	Host nation	Nations	Sports	Ref
1	2027	Kaohsiung	Taiwan			

== See also ==
- Youth Olympic Games (ages 15–18)
