= Ján Nálepka =

Slovak partisan (1912–1943)

- Born: 20 September 1912; Smižany, Slovakia (now Slovakia)
- Died: 16 November 1943 (aged 31); Ovruch, Axis powers-occupied Ukrainian SSR, Soviet Union (now Ukraine)
- Burial place: Chernivtsi, Ukraine
- Military career
- Allegiance: Czechoslovakia (1934–1939) (Slovak Republic (1939–1945)) Slovak Republic (1939–1943); Soviet Union (1943)
- Service years: 1934–1943
- Rank: Captain, brigadier general (posthumously)
- Nickname: "Repkin"
- Conflicts: World War II
- Awards: Hero of the Soviet Union; Hero of the Slovak National Uprising

Ján Nálepka (20 September 1912 in Szepessümeg (Slovak: Smižany), Austria-Hungary – 16 November 1943 in Ovruch, Axis powers-occupied Ukrainian SSR, Soviet Union) was a Slovak captain who organized and led an anti-fascist Slovak partisan detachment in the Soviet Union during World War II.

== Biography ==
Nálepka was born into a peasant family in the village of Szepessümeg (Smižany). From 1931, he worked as a teacher in Stupava, Poruba pod Vihorlatom, Dolná Mariková and Horná Mariková. From 1934 he served as a lieutenant in the Czechoslovak Army, and since 1939 he served in the Slovak armed forces. In 1939 he took part in the Slovak advance into Poland. In 1941, the German-allied Slovak State participated in Operation Barbarossa, Nazi Germany's attack on the Soviet Union, and the military unit in which Nálepka served was sent to fight against the Red Army on the Eastern Front. In 1942, while he was chief of staff of a Slovak regiment stationed in the town of Yel’sk, Nálepka started organizing an underground anti-fascist group inside the army. For example, Nálepka's group would give the local population information about the situation on the front lines, sabotage railway tracks, and give false information to German military aviators, so that they would bomb uninhabited forest areas instead of towns and villages. The same year, Nálepka also established contacts with Soviet partisans.

On the night between 14 and 15 June 1943, Nálepka and several other Slovak officers and soldiers defected from the Slovak Army and joined the partisans. They formed a partisan detachment and fought against the German troops, and called for Slovak soldiers to join them. Nálepka was made commander of the detachment, and was given the nickname Repkin by the Soviet partisans. Early in November 1943, Nálepka joined the Communist Party of the Soviet Union.

On 16 November 1943, Nálepka's detachment tried to liberate the town of Ovruch from German occupation, together with Soviet partisans and troops of the 1st Ukrainian Front. However, Nálepka and several other Slovak anti-fascist fighters were attacked and killed during an assault on the town's railway station. He was buried in a mass grave in Chernivtsi.

== Awards and honours ==
- Hero of the Soviet Union (May 2, 1945; posthumously — making him the only Slovak to be awarded this title)
- Hero of the Slovak National Uprising (May 5, 1945)
- Order of Lenin (May 2, 1945; posthumously)
- Order of the White Lion, I Class (October 28, 1948)
- Medal "Partisan of the Patriotic War", 1st class
- Order of Ľudovít Štúr, 2nd Class (August 31, 1996)
- rank of brigadier general by the President of Slovakia, Rudolf Schuster (May 7, 2004; posthumously)

== Memorials ==
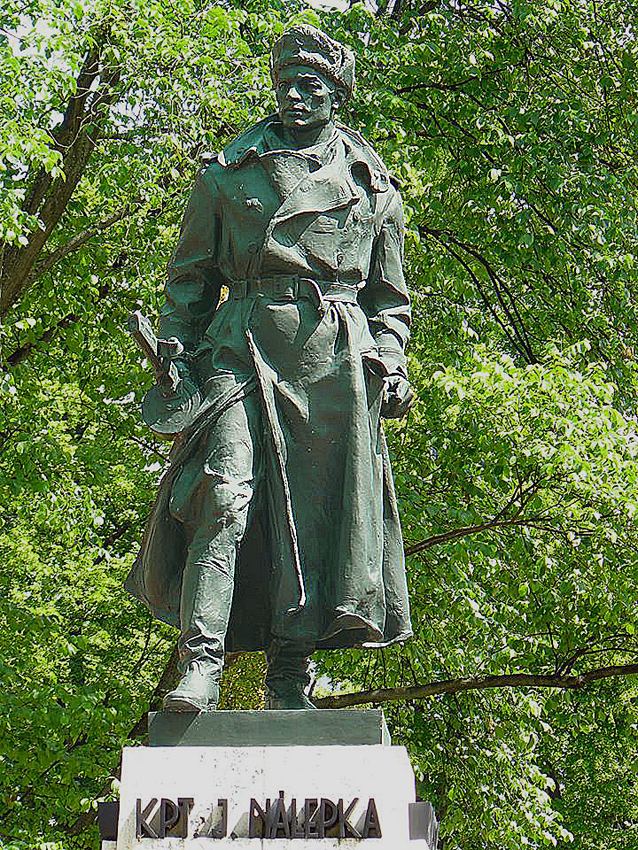
Statue of Ján Nálepka in Spišská Nová Ves, Slovakia.

Statue of Ján Nálepka, 3d scan

The village Vondrišel in Gelnica District, Slovakia, was renamed Nálepkovo in 1948.

Towns where streets have been named after Ján Nálepka include Brno, Ostrava, Piešťany and Pezinok. A commemorative plaque has been placed on the house in Smižany where he was born, and a street there has also been named after him. Overall, more than a hundred streets in former Czechoslovakia, and several in the former Soviet Union, bear Nálepka's name.

A school in Stupava, where Nálepka worked as a teacher, has been named after him, and there is an equestrian statue of him in the same town. A statue of Nálepka also stands in the center of Spišská Nová Ves.

There is also a monument to Nálepka in Ovruch, Ukraine, the town where he perished. In Yel’sk, Belarus, a commemorative plaque has been placed on the house where Nálepka lived from 1942 until 1943.

A movie about Ján Nálepka, titled Zajtra bude neskoro (Tomorrow It Will Be Too Late), was made in 1972. It was a joint Soviet-Czechoslovak production, and casts Slovak actor Milan Kňažko as Nálepka.
