= Black Mountain, Slovakia =

Mountain range in eastern Slovakia

Black Mountain (Čierna hora)
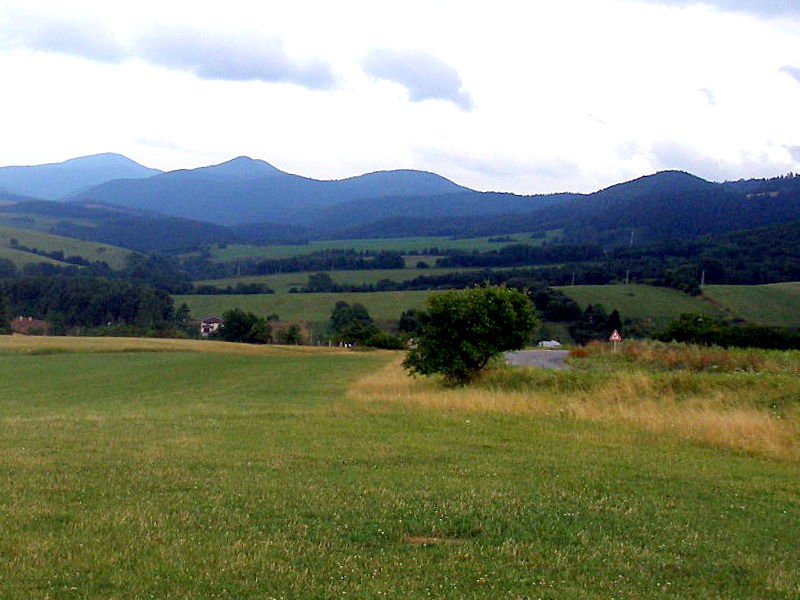
- The mountains seen from Kojšov

Highest point
- Peak: Roháčka
- Elevation: 1,029 m (3,376 ft)

Dimensions
- Area: 250 km^{2} (97 mi^{2})

Geography
- Location within Slovakia
- Country: Slovakia
- Range coordinates: 48°50′00″N 21°08′00″E
- Parent range: Slovak Ore Mountains

Black Mountain (Slovak: Čierna hora [ˈtʂɪerna ˈɦɔra], German: Schwarzer Berg) is a small mountain range in eastern Slovakia. It forms part of the Slovak Ore Mountains. The range is located roughly between the city of Košice to the southeast and the municipalities of Krompachy to the northwest and Kysak to the northeast and has an area of about 250 km². Its highest point is the Roháčka (1,029 m n.m.) between Margecany and Kluknava.

The region of the Black Mountain is drained by the River Hornád. Within the range lies the reservoir of Ružín, built in the 1960s, whose main purpose is to supply water, but which also serves as a recreation area.

On the lower slopes beech is predominant, the higher reaches are covered by spruce and mixed forest.

The range itself is only sparsely settled. Part of the main line from Košice to Žilina runs through the mountains with large railway hubs in Margecany and Kysak.
