= Závadka =

Závadka may refer to:

- Závadka, Gelnica District, Slovakia
- Závadka, Humenné District, Slovakia
- Závadka, Michalovce District, Slovakia
- Zavadka, Skole Raion, Ukraine
