= Nálepkovo =

Nálepkovo Wagendrüssel
- Municipality
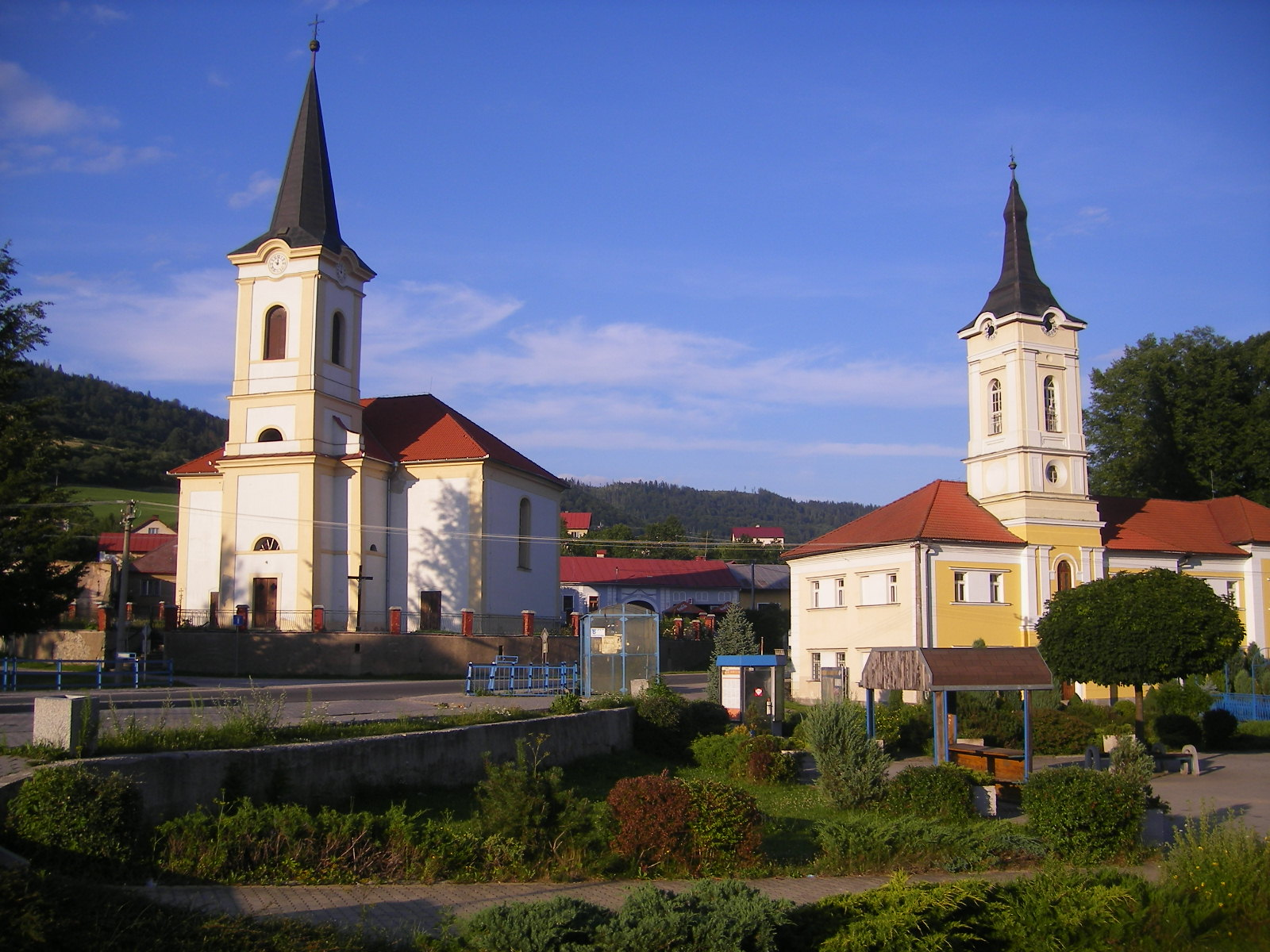
- Catholic church and municipal office

- Flag Coat of arms

- Location of Nálepkovo in the Košice Region Location of Nálepkovo in Slovakia
- Coordinates: 48.85°N 20.63°E
- Country: Slovakia
- Region: Košice Region
- District: Gelnica District
- First mentioned: 1290

Area
  - Total: 55.65 km^{2} (21.49 sq mi)
- Elevation: 590 m (1,940 ft)

Population (2025)
  - Total: 3,937
- Time zone: UTC+1 (CET)
  - Summer (DST): UTC+2 (CEST)
- Postal code: 533 3
- Area code: +421 53
- Vehicle registration plate (until 2022): GL
- Website: www.nalepkovo.sk

Nálepkovo, formerly Vondrišel (German: Wagendrüssel, Hungarian: Merény) is a village and municipality in the Gelnica District in the Košice Region of eastern Slovakia. Total municipality population was in 2011 3,039 inhabitants. Previously, the village was named Vondrišel, but in 1948 after the German population was expelled it was renamed Nálepkovo, after the anti-fascist Slovak captain Ján Nálepka.

== Geography ==
The municipality lies at an altitude of 590 metres (1,940 ft) and covers an area of 55.65 km^{2} (21.49 sq mi) (2025).

== Population ==
Population statistic (10 years)
Year	1995	2005	2015	2025
Count	2444	2825	3288	3937
Difference		+15.58%	+16.38%	+19.73%

Population statistic
Year	2024	2025
Count	3861	3937
Difference		+1.96%

It has a population of 3937 people (31 December 2025).

=== Ethnicity ===
Census 2021 (1+ %)
Ethnicity	Number	Fraction
Slovak	3468	95.53%
Not found out	123	3.38%
Romani	94	2.58%
Total	3630	

In year 2021 was 3630 people by ethnicity 3468 as Slovak, 123 as Not found out, 94 as Romani, 10 as Rusyn, 9 as German, 3 as Hungarian, 1 as Czech, 1 as Italian, 1 as Russian, 1 as Austrian, 1 as Polish and 1 as Other.

Note on population: The difference values of population numbers in the table "Population statistic" and in the sections "Ethnicity" & "Religion" is caused by the use of various statistical methods.

A majority of the municipality's population consists of the local Roma community. In 2019, they constituted an estimated 60% of the local population.

=== Religion ===
Census 2021 (1+ %)
Religion	Number	Fraction
Roman Catholic Church	2400	66.12%
None	940	25.9%
Not found out	140	3.86%
Greek Catholic Church	83	2.29%
Evangelical Church	42	1.16%
Total	3630	

In year 2021 was 3630 people by religion 2400 from Roman Catholic Church, 940 from None, 140 from Not found out, 83 from Greek Catholic Church, 42 from Evangelical Church, 10 from Eastern Orthodox Church, 3 from Old Catholic Church, 3 from Calvinist Church, 3 from Jehovah's Witnesses, 2 from Christian Congregations in Slovakia, 2 from Apostolic Church, 1 from Baptists Church and 1 from Ad hoc movements.
