= Henclová =

Henclová Henclófalva
- Municipality
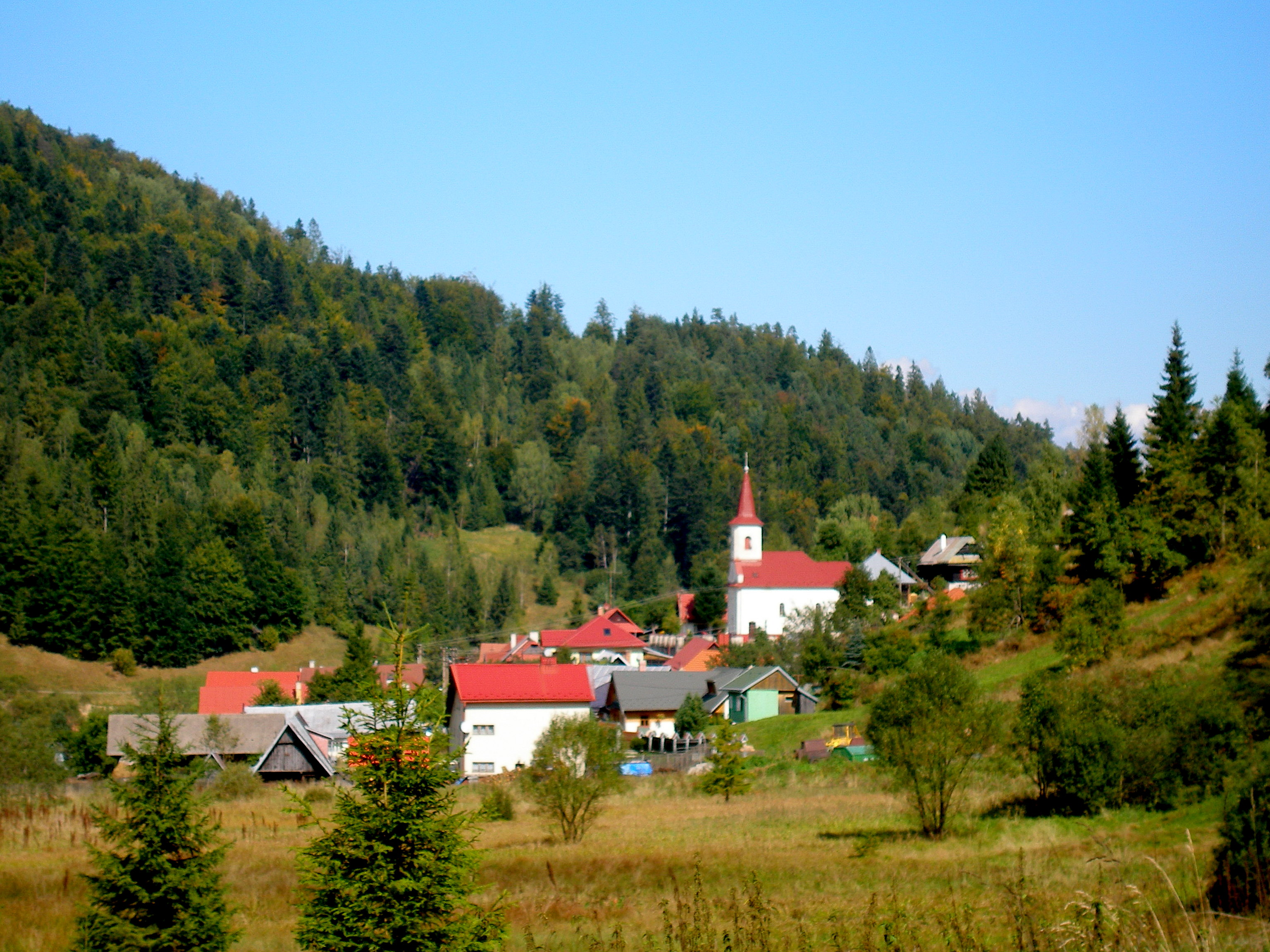

- Flag

- Location of Henclová in the Košice Region Location of Henclová in Slovakia
- Coordinates: 48.79°N 20.60°E
- Country: Slovakia
- Region: Košice Region
- District: Gelnica District
- First mentioned: 1548

Area
  - Total: 14.31 km^{2} (5.53 sq mi)
- Elevation: 650 m (2,130 ft)

Population (2025)
  - Total: 107
- Time zone: UTC+1 (CET)
  - Summer (DST): UTC+2 (CEST)
- Postal code: 533 3
- Area code: +421 53
- Vehicle registration plate (until 2022): GL
- Website: www.henclova.ocu.sk

Henclová (Hungarian: Henclófalva) is a village and municipality in the Gelnica District in the Košice Region of eastern Slovakia. In 2011 had been total municipality population 103 inhabitants.

== Geography ==
The municipality lies at an altitude of 650 metres (2,130 ft) and covers an area of 14.31 km^{2} (5.53 sq mi) (2025).

== History ==
Štilbach was founded in 1344 as the third mining town in the upper valley of Hnilca. According to the charter of 1338, the entire territory of Tiche Voda and its surroundings was declared a free mining town. In the surrounding mountains, the town was populated mainly with copper. In the years 1489 - 1527, honey was processed to process copper ore.

At the end of 1556, Štilbach was destroyed and the population was stolen by the soldiers of František Bebek, Mr Krásná Hôrka, who left the people who had rescued to the surrounding villages (Švedlár, Mníšek, Smolník) and the town disappeared. The remains of the victims were found during the construction of the church in the years 1888 - 1891. The new settlement of the territory of Štilbach began in the middle of the 18th century. Upon the end of the revolt and cholera epidemics, the territory inhabited by the ancestors of the village's current inhabitants was mostly migratory from Zamaguria. At the end of the 19th century, people began massively leaving for work in America.

Church of the Virgin Mary began to build in 1890, completed with the help of Count Andrassyi in 1891, but without a tower. It was built only in 1927, when the citizens bought a new bell, which was consecrated by the parish priest Ján Kočiš. Church of St. Jozef, a worker in Štilbach, was finished in 1892 after the hard work of the whole village. Citizens had to settle down and pick up rocks from the ruins, and then discover the bones of old German citizens. The oak stairs that are now leading to the chorus, the women brought back to Rožňava on their backs. After the construction of the church, residents of both villages built a church school with a teacher's flat. However, a treaty between the hosts of Štilbach and Henkel about the establishment of the church school in Štilbach, on the terms of payment of the teacher of July 12, 1857, was maintained at the farmstead in Nálepkov.

In 1912 a narrow-rail railroad was built to move the sawmill wood to Vondišla (currently Nálepkovo). In 1925, the villages of Štilbach - Tichá Voda and Henclová were connected to one municipality, which was named Hencl

== Population ==
Population statistic (10 years)
Year	1995	2005	2015	2025
Count	146	117	109	107
Difference		−19.86%	−6.83%	−1.83%

Population statistic
Year	2024	2025
Count	101	107
Difference		+5.94%

It has a population of 107 people (31 December 2025).

=== Ethnicity ===
Census 2021 (1+ %)
Ethnicity	Number	Fraction
Slovak	96	96%
Not found out	4	4%
Total	100	

In year 2021 was 100 people by ethnicity 96 as Slovak and 4 as Not found out.

Note on population: The difference values of population numbers in the table "Population statistic" and in the sections "Ethnicity" & "Religion" is caused by the use of various statistical methods.

=== Religion ===
Census 2021 (1+ %)
Religion	Number	Fraction
Roman Catholic Church	91	91%
Not found out	4	4%
Seventh-day Adventist Church	3	3%
None	2	2%
Total	100	

In year 2021 was 100 people by religion 91 from Roman Catholic Church, 4 from Not found out, 3 from Seventh-day Adventist Church and 2 from None.

== See also ==
- List of municipalities and towns in Slovakia

== Genealogical resources ==
The records for genealogical research are available at the state archive "Statny Archiv in Levoca, Slovakia"

- Roman Catholic church records (births/marriages/deaths): 1668-1934 (parish B)
