= Jaklovce =

Jaklovce Jekelfalva
- Municipality
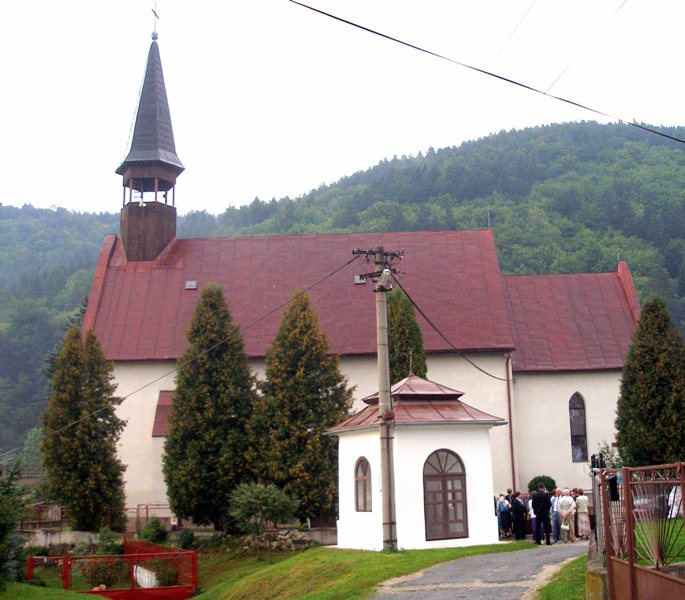

- Flag

- Location of Jaklovce in the Košice Region Location of Jaklovce in Slovakia
- Coordinates: 48.87°N 21.00°E
- Country: Slovakia
- Region: Košice Region
- District: Gelnica District
- First mentioned: 1282

Area
  - Total: 17.25 km^{2} (6.66 sq mi)
- Elevation: 325 m (1,066 ft)

Population (2025)
  - Total: 1,806
- Time zone: UTC+1 (CET)
  - Summer (DST): UTC+2 (CEST)
- Postal code: 556 1
- Area code: +421 53
- Vehicle registration plate (until 2022): GL
- Website: www.jaklovce.sk

Jaklovce (Hungarian: Jekelfalva) is a village and municipality in the Gelnica District in the Košice Region of eastern Slovakia. The total population of the municipality was 1,885 in 2011. The river Hnilec flows through the village.

== See also ==
- List of municipalities and towns in Slovakia

== Geography ==
The municipality lies at an altitude of 325 metres (1,066 ft) and covers an area of 17.25 km^{2} (6.66 sq mi) (2025).

== Population ==
Population statistic (10 years)
Year	1995	2005	2015	2025
Count	1956	1966	1902	1806
Difference		+0.51%	−3.25%	−5.04%

Population statistic
Year	2024	2025
Count	1802	1806
Difference		+0.22%

It has a population of 1806 people (31 December 2025).

=== Ethnicity ===
Census 2021 (1+ %)
Ethnicity	Number	Fraction
Slovak	1750	94.95%
Not found out	92	4.99%
Romani	21	1.13%
Total	1843	

In year 2021 was 1843 people by ethnicity 1750 as Slovak, 92 as Not found out, 21 as Romani, 5 as Czech, 4 as Rusyn, 2 as German, 2 as Hungarian, 2 as Other, 1 as Chinese, 1 as Russian and 1 as Romanian.

Note on population: The difference values of population numbers in the table "Population statistic" and in the sections "Ethnicity" & "Religion" is caused by the use of various statistical methods.

=== Religion ===
Census 2021 (1+ %)
Religion	Number	Fraction
Roman Catholic Church	1408	76.4%
None	247	13.4%
Not found out	110	5.97%
Greek Catholic Church	36	1.95%
Evangelical Church	21	1.14%
Total	1843	

In year 2021 was 1843 people by religion 1408 from Roman Catholic Church, 247 from None, 110 from Not found out, 36 from Greek Catholic Church, 21 from Evangelical Church, 4 from Eastern Orthodox Church, 4 from Ad hoc movements, 3 from Buddhism, 2 from Paganism and natural spirituality, 2 from Christian Congregations in Slovakia, 2 from Other, 1 from Calvinist Church, 1 from Jehovah's Witnesses, 1 from United Methodist Church and 1 from Church of the Brethren.

== Genealogical resources ==
The records for genealogical research are available at the state archive "Statny Archiv in Levoca, Slovakia"

- Roman Catholic church records (births/marriages/deaths): 1716-1920 (parish A)
- Greek Catholic church records (births/marriages/deaths): 1727-1896 (parish B)
- Lutheran church records (births/marriages/deaths): 1783-1896 (parish B)
