= Veľký Folkmár =

Veľký Folkmár Nagysolymár
- Municipality
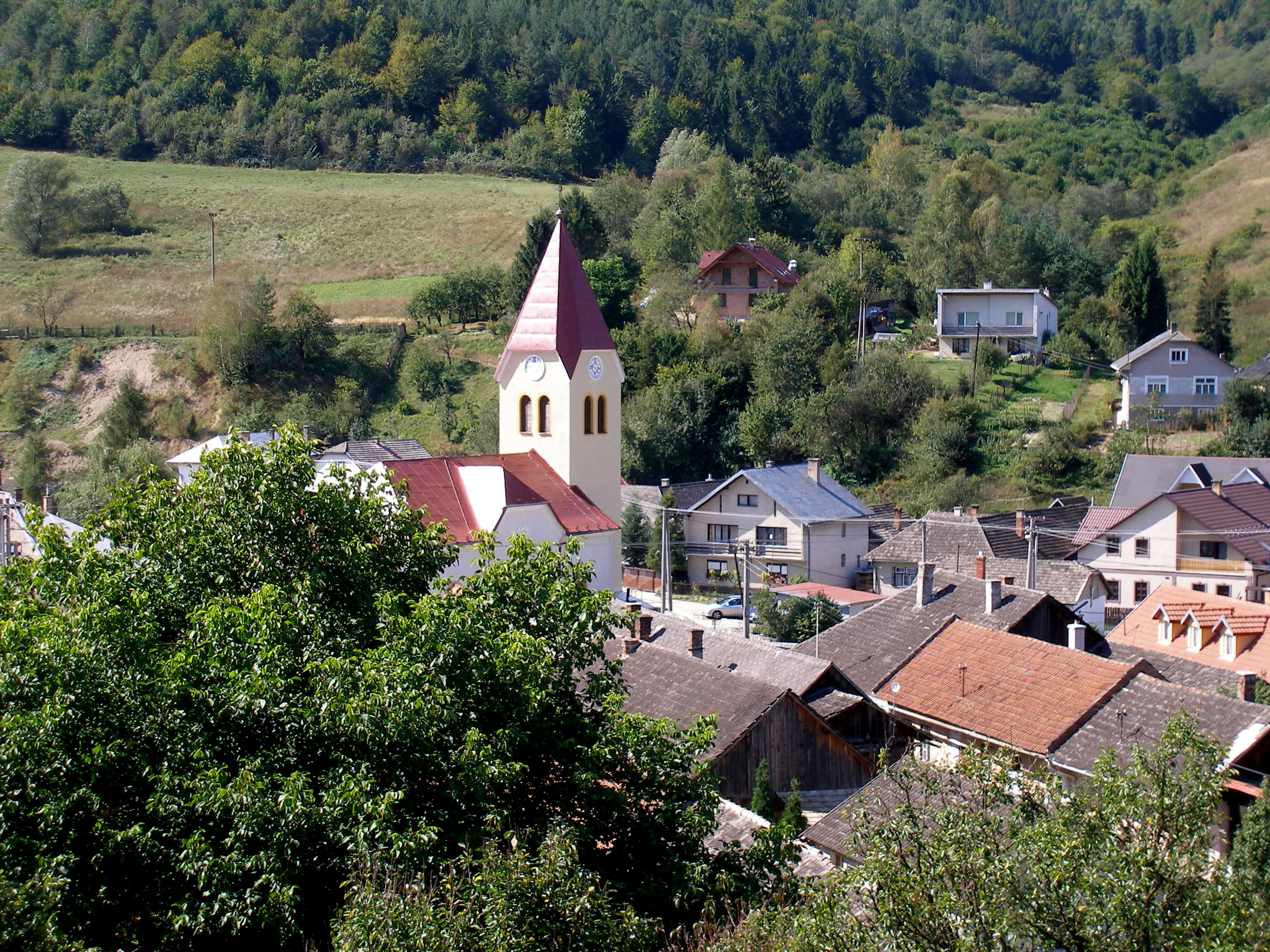

- Flag

- Location of Veľký Folkmár in the Košice Region Location of Veľký Folkmár in Slovakia
- Coordinates: 48.86°N 21.01°E
- Country: Slovakia
- Region: Košice Region
- District: Gelnica District
- First mentioned: 1336

Area
  - Total: 23.10 km^{2} (8.92 sq mi)
- Elevation: 379 m (1,243 ft)

Population (2025)
  - Total: 868
- Time zone: UTC+1 (CET)
  - Summer (DST): UTC+2 (CEST)
- Postal code: 05551
- Area code: +421 053
- Vehicle registration plate (until 2022): GL
- Website: www.velkyfolkmar.sk

Veľký Folkmár (Hungarian: Nagysolymár) is a village and municipality in the Gelnica District in the Košice Region of eastern Slovakia.

== Geography ==
Veľký Folkmár is located in the area of Slovak Ore Mountains, further, it lies in a unit of Volovské Vrchy and Kojšovská Hoľa sub-whole. River Kojšovský potok flows through the village. Veľký Folkmár lies at an altitude of 370 meters above sea level. The village lies in a valley with hilly terrain and wooded areas around it. The highest peak of Veľký Folkmár is Folkmarská Skala with an altitude of 915 meters above sea level.

Veľký Folkmár is a part of the Košice Region, further, it is a part of the Gelnica district.

The municipality lies at an altitude of 379 metres (1,243 ft) and covers an area of 23.10 km^{2} (8.92 sq mi) (2025).

== Population ==
Population statistic (10 years)
Year	1995	2005	2015	2025
Count	893	911	910	868
Difference		+2.01%	−0.10%	−4.61%

Population statistic
Year	2024	2025
Count	873	868
Difference		−0.57%

It has a population of 868 people (31 December 2025).

=== Ethnicity ===
Census 2021 (1+ %)
Ethnicity	Number	Fraction
Slovak	846	95.7%
Not found out	41	4.63%
Total	884	

In year 2021 was 884 people by ethnicity 846 as Slovak, 41 as Not found out, 2 as Czech, 2 as Rusyn, 1 as Hungarian and 1 as Other.

Note on population: The difference values of population numbers in the table "Population statistic" and in the sections "Ethnicity" & "Religion" is caused by the use of various statistical methods.

=== Religion ===
Census 2021 (1+ %)
Religion	Number	Fraction
Roman Catholic Church	548	61.99%
Evangelical Church	167	18.89%
None	99	11.2%
Not found out	37	4.19%
Greek Catholic Church	16	1.81%
Total	884	

In year 2021 was 884 people by religion 548 from Roman Catholic Church, 167 from Evangelical Church, 99 from None, 37 from Not found out, 16 from Greek Catholic Church, 3 from Jehovah's Witnesses, 3 from Other, 3 from Apostolic Church, 2 from Baptists Church, 1 from Calvinist Church, 1 from Eastern Orthodox Church, 1 from Other and not ascertained christian church, 1 from United Methodist Church, 1 from Czechoslovak Hussite Church and 1 from Ad hoc movements.
