= Úhorná =

Úhorná Dénes
- Municipality
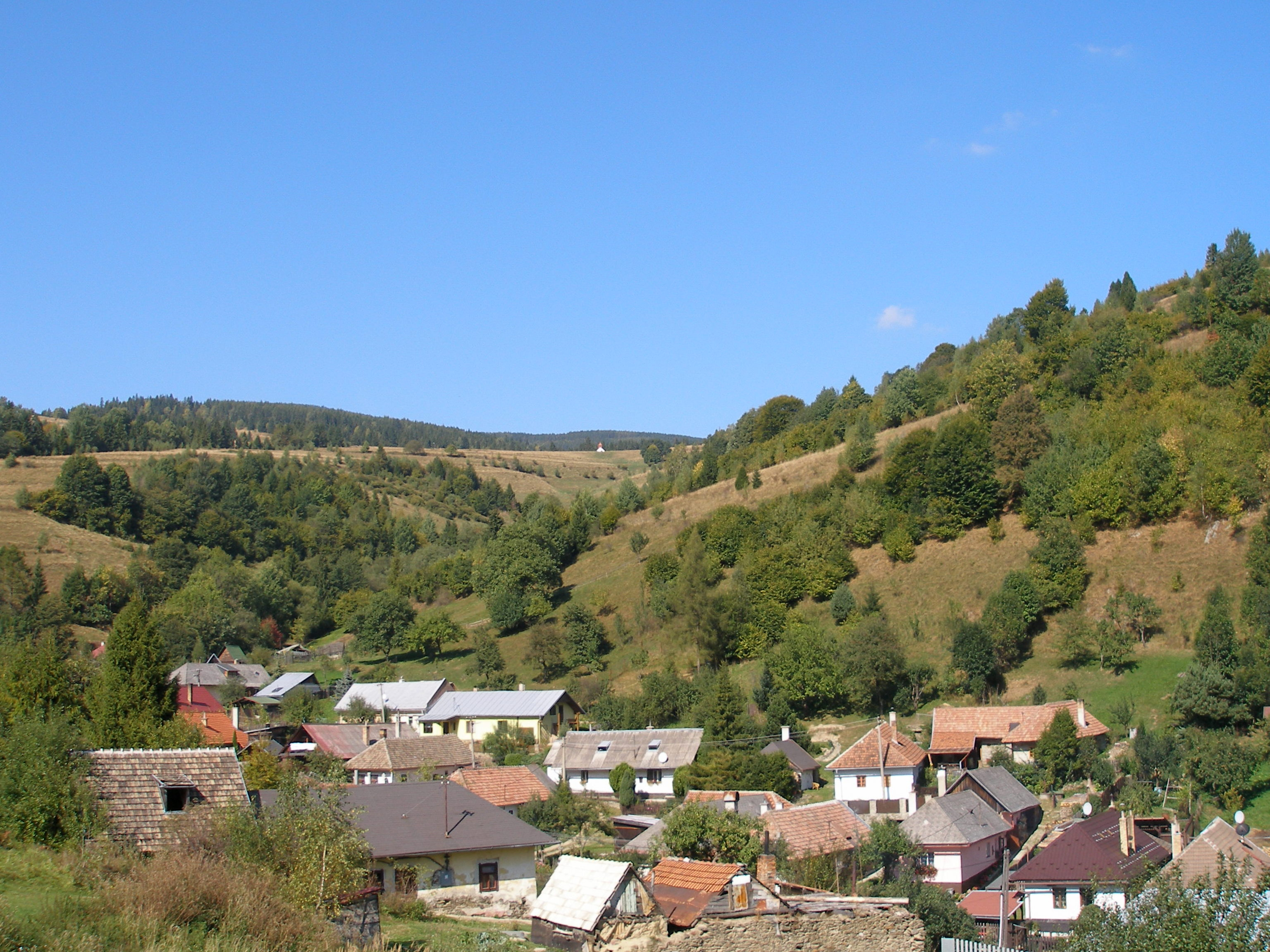

- Flag

- Location of Úhorná in the Košice Region Location of Úhorná in Slovakia
- Coordinates: 48.70°N 20.67°E
- Country: Slovakia
- Region: Košice Region
- District: Gelnica District
- First mentioned: 1383

Area
  - Total: 8.82 km^{2} (3.41 sq mi)
- Elevation: 688 m (2,257 ft)

Population (2025)
  - Total: 148
- Time zone: UTC+1 (CET)
  - Summer (DST): UTC+2 (CEST)
- Postal code: 556 7
- Area code: +421 53
- Vehicle registration plate (until 2022): GL
- Website: www.uhorna.sk

Úhorná (Hungarian: Dénes) is a village and municipality in the Gelnica District in the Košice Region of eastern Slovakia. Total municipality population was in 2011 150 inhabitants.

== Geography ==
The municipality lies at an altitude of 688 metres (2,257 ft) and covers an area of 8.82 km^{2} (3.41 sq mi) (2025).

== Population ==
Population statistic (10 years)
Year	1995	2005	2015	2025
Count	194	150	144	148
Difference		−22.68%	−4%	+2.77%

Population statistic
Year	2024	2025
Count	143	148
Difference		+3.49%

It has a population of 148 people (31 December 2025).

=== Ethnicity ===
Census 2021 (1+ %)
Ethnicity	Number	Fraction
Slovak	99	70.21%
Romani	30	21.27%
Not found out	11	7.8%
Ukrainian	3	2.12%
Total	141	

In year 2021 was 141 people by ethnicity 99 as Slovak, 30 as Romani, 11 as Not found out, 3 as Ukrainian, 1 as Czech, 1 as Rusyn, 1 as German and 1 as Other.

Note on population: The difference values of population numbers in the table "Population statistic" and in the sections "Ethnicity" & "Religion" is caused by the use of various statistical methods.

=== Religion ===
Census 2021 (1+ %)
Religion	Number	Fraction
Roman Catholic Church	71	50.35%
None	51	36.17%
Not found out	11	7.8%
Eastern Orthodox Church	4	2.84%
Greek Catholic Church	2	1.42%
Evangelical Church	2	1.42%
Total	141	

In year 2021 was 141 people by religion 71 from Roman Catholic Church, 51 from None, 11 from Not found out, 4 from Eastern Orthodox Church, 2 from Greek Catholic Church and 2 from Evangelical Church.
