= Švedlár =

Švedlár Schwedler
- Municipality
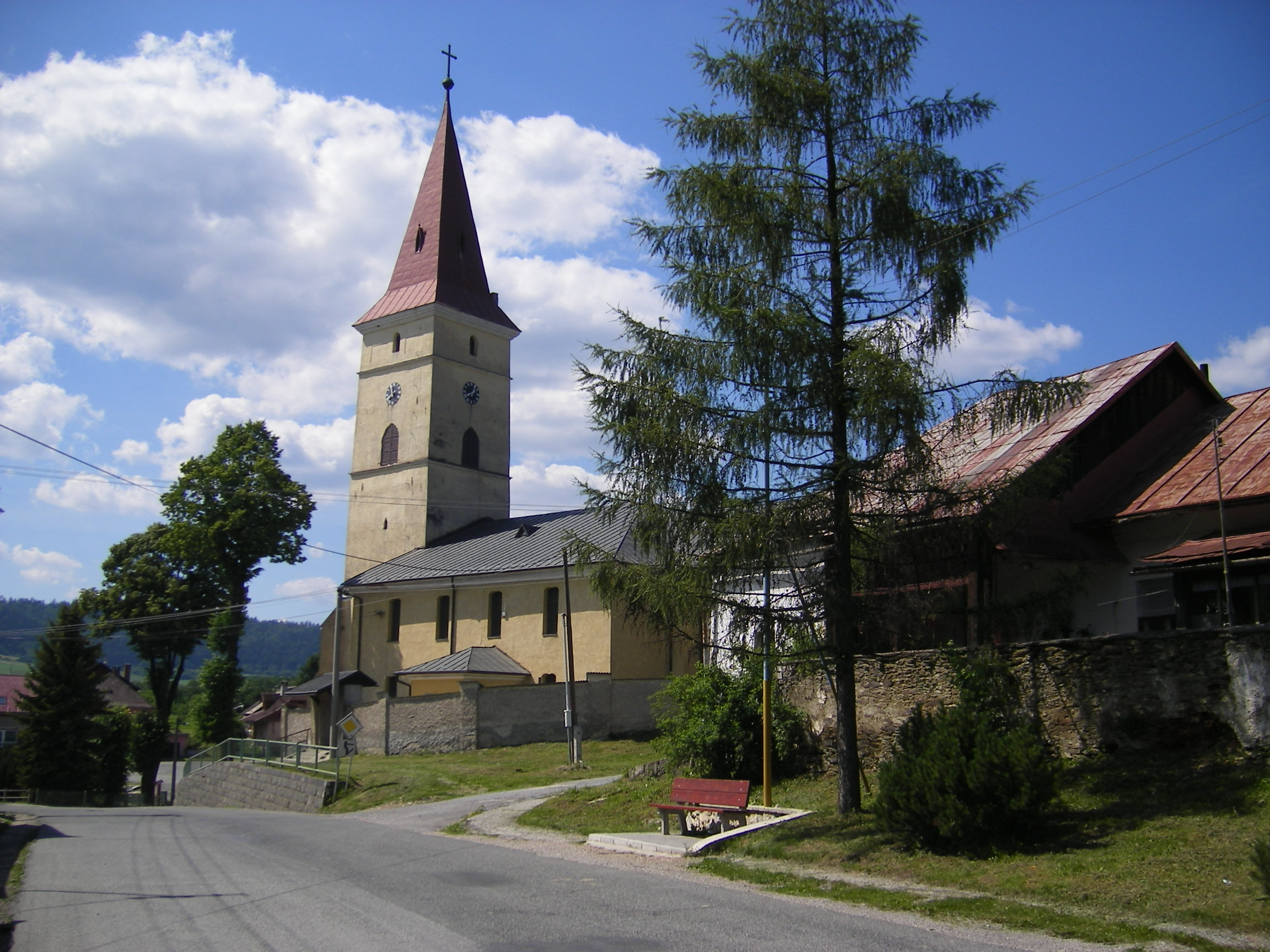

- Flag

- Location of Švedlár in the Košice Region Location of Švedlár in Slovakia
- Coordinates: 48.82°N 20.72°E
- Country: Slovakia
- Region: Košice Region
- District: Gelnica District
- First mentioned: 1338

Area
  - Total: 84.49 km^{2} (32.62 sq mi)
- Elevation: 481 m (1,578 ft)

Population (2025)
  - Total: 2,109
- Time zone: UTC+1 (CET)
  - Summer (DST): UTC+2 (CEST)
- Postal code: 533 4
- Area code: +421 53
- Vehicle registration plate (until 2022): GL
- Website: www.svedlar.sk

Švedlár (German: Schwedler, Hungarian: Svedlér) is a village and municipality in the Gelnica District in the Košice Region of eastern Slovakia. Total municipality population was, in 2011, 2083 inhabitants. The town predominantly consisted of Carpathian Germans until 1945, when they were expelled.

== Geography ==
The municipality lies at an altitude of 481 metres (1,578 ft) and covers an area of 84.49 km^{2} (32.62 sq mi) (2025).

== Population ==
Population statistic (10 years)
Year	1995	2005	2015	2025
Count	1666	1981	2106	2109
Difference		+18.90%	+6.30%	+0.14%

Population statistic
Year	2024	2025
Count	2087	2109
Difference		+1.05%

It has a population of 2109 people (31 December 2025).

=== Ethnicity ===
Census 2021 (1+ %)
Ethnicity	Number	Fraction
Slovak	1814	85.89%
Romani	394	18.65%
Not found out	167	7.9%
German	50	2.36%
Total	2112	

In year 2021 was 2112 people by ethnicity 1814 as Slovak, 394 as Romani, 167 as Not found out, 50 as German, 4 as Czech, 3 as Rusyn, 2 as Ukrainian, 2 as English, 1 as Jewish, 1 as Russian and 1 as Hungarian.

Note on population: The difference values of population numbers in the table "Population statistic" and in the sections "Ethnicity" & "Religion" is caused by the use of various statistical methods.

The vast majority of the municipality's population consists of the local Roma community. In 2019, they constituted an estimated 67% of the local population.

=== Religion ===
Census 2021 (1+ %)
Religion	Number	Fraction
Roman Catholic Church	1553	73.53%
Evangelical Church	162	7.67%
Not found out	161	7.62%
None	161	7.62%
Greek Catholic Church	51	2.41%
Total	2112	

In year 2021 was 2112 people by religion 1553 from Roman Catholic Church, 162 from Evangelical Church, 161 from Not found out, 161 from None, 51 from Greek Catholic Church, 7 from Christian Congregations in Slovakia, 6 from Eastern Orthodox Church, 4 from Calvinist Church, 3 from Jehovah's Witnesses, 1 from Other and not ascertained christian church, 1 from Other, 1 from Apostolic Church and 1 from Ad hoc movements.
