= Smolník, Gelnica District =

Smolník Schmöllnitz
- Municipality
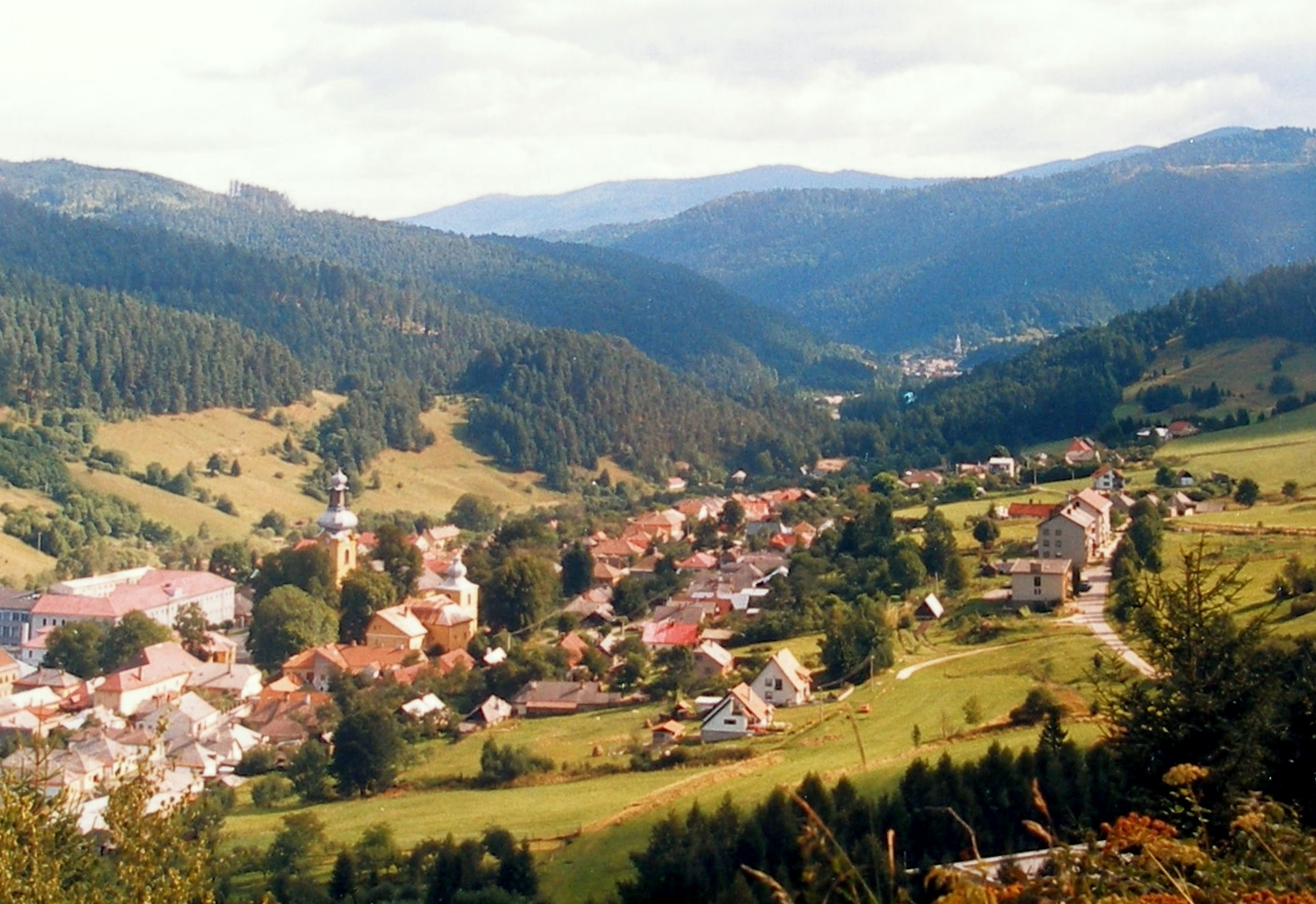

- Flag Coat of arms

- Location of Smolník in the Košice Region Location of Smolník in Slovakia
- Coordinates: 48.73°N 20.73°E
- Country: Slovakia
- Region: Košice Region
- District: Gelnica District
- First mentioned: 1327

Area
  - Total: 68.97 km^{2} (26.63 sq mi)
- Elevation: 567 m (1,860 ft)

Population (2025)
  - Total: 933
- Time zone: UTC+1 (CET)
  - Summer (DST): UTC+2 (CEST)
- Postal code: 556 6
- Area code: +421 53
- Vehicle registration plate (until 2022): GL
- Website: www.smolnik.sk

Smolník (German: Schmöllnitz, Hungarian: Szomolnok) is a village and municipality in the Gelnica District in the Košice Region of eastern Slovakia.

== Etymology ==
Smolník, originally Schmöllnitz, is a municipality in eastern Slovakia in the historic Spiš region, founded by German settlers. The first written evidence of settlement by German miners dates back to the 13th century (1225).

German word schmelzen means melt, as there were smelters in the valley, formerly in dialect schmöllzen – Schmöllnitz – later Smolník via phonetic transcription.

== Population ==
Population statistic (10 years)
Year	1995	2005	2015	2025
Count	1248	1263	1055	933
Difference		+1.20%	−16.46%	−11.56%

Population statistic
Year	2024	2025
Count	944	933
Difference		−1.16%

It has a population of 933 people (31 December 2025).

=== Ethnicity ===
Census 2021 (1+ %)
Ethnicity	Number	Fraction
Slovak	895	90.77%
Not found out	64	6.49%
German	34	3.44%
Ukrainian	19	1.92%
Romani	13	1.31%
Total	986	

In year 2021 was 986 people by ethnicity 895 as Slovak, 64 as Not found out, 34 as German, 19 as Ukrainian, 13 as Romani, 6 as Czech, 5 as Hungarian, 4 as Rusyn, 2 as Other, 1 as Jewish, 1 as Vietnamese, 1 as Russian, 1 as Polish, 1 as Canadian, 1 as Croatian and 1 as English.

Note on population: The difference values of population numbers in the table "Population statistic" and in the sections "Ethnicity" & "Religion" is caused by the use of various statistical methods.

=== Religion ===
Census 2021 (1+ %)
Religion	Number	Fraction
Roman Catholic Church	629	63.79%
None	189	19.17%
Not found out	83	8.42%
Evangelical Church	27	2.74%
Eastern Orthodox Church	23	2.33%
Greek Catholic Church	20	2.03%
Total	986	

In year 2021 was 986 people by religion 629 from Roman Catholic Church, 189 from None, 83 from Not found out, 27 from Evangelical Church, 23 from Eastern Orthodox Church, 20 from Greek Catholic Church, 3 from Buddhism, 2 from Jewish community, 2 from Paganism and natural spirituality, 2 from Jehovah's Witnesses, 2 from Christian Congregations in Slovakia, 2 from Islam, 1 from United Methodist Church and 1 from Ad hoc movements.
