= Mníšek nad Hnilcom =

Mníšek nad Hnilcom Einsiedel an der Göllnitz
- Municipality
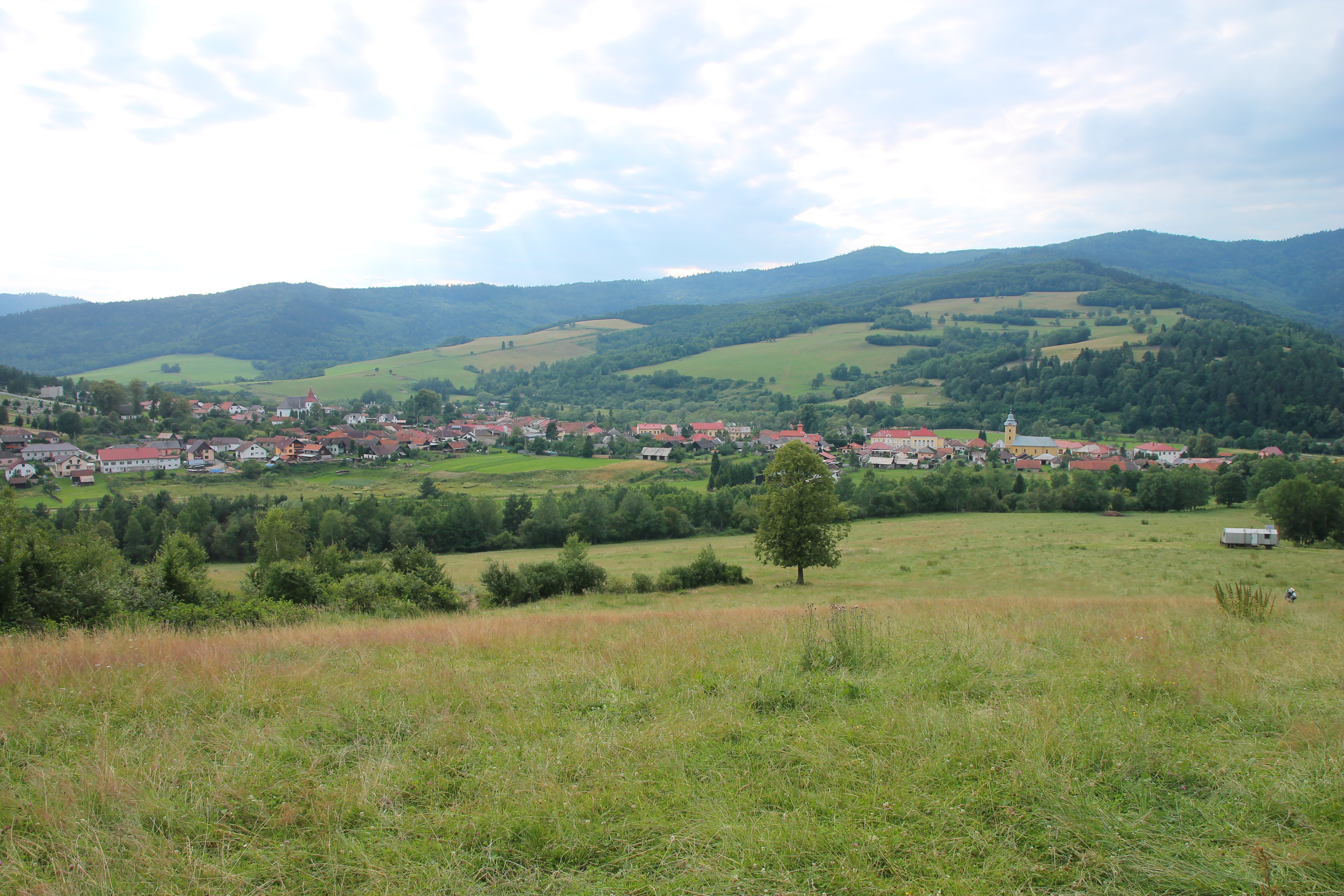

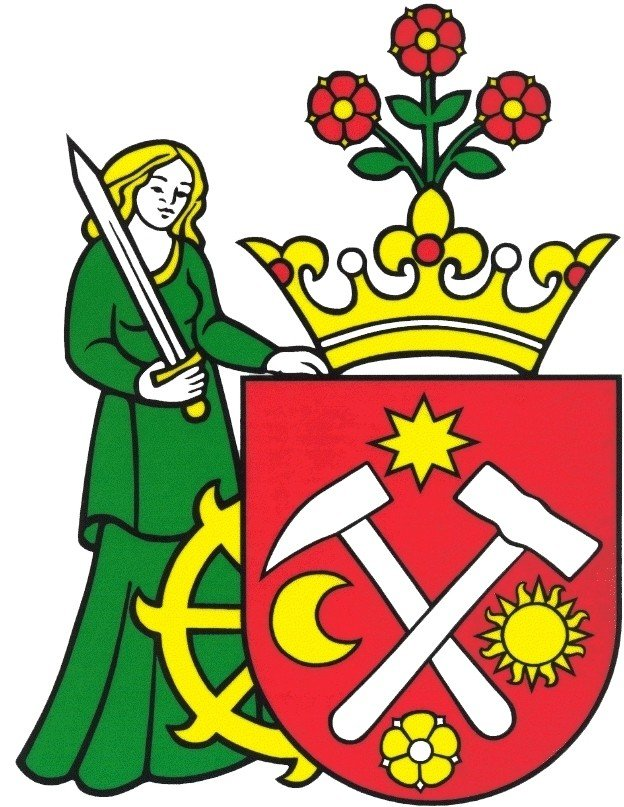
- Flag Coat of arms

- Location of Mníšek nad Hnilcom in the Košice Region Location of Mníšek nad Hnilcom in Slovakia
- Coordinates: 48.80°N 20.80°E
- Country: Slovakia
- Region: Košice Region
- District: Gelnica District
- First mentioned: 1322

Area
  - Total: 39.43 km^{2} (15.22 sq mi)
- Elevation: 431 m (1,414 ft)

Population (2025)
  - Total: 1,842
- Time zone: UTC+1 (CET)
  - Summer (DST): UTC+2 (CEST)
- Postal code: 556 4
- Area code: +421 53
- Vehicle registration plate (until 2022): GL
- Website: mnisek.sk

Mníšek nad Hnilcom (German: Einsiedel an der Göllnitz; Hungarian: Szepesremete) is a village and municipality in the Gelnica District in the Košice Region of eastern Slovakia. Total municipality population was in 2011 1688 inhabitants. It belonged to a German language island. The German population was expelled in 1945.

== Geography ==
The municipality lies at an altitude of 431 metres (1,414 ft) and covers an area of 39.43 km^{2} (15.22 sq mi) (2025).

== Population ==
Population statistic (10 years)
Year	1995	2005	2015	2025
Count	1633	1712	1769	1842
Difference		+4.83%	+3.32%	+4.12%

Population statistic
Year	2024	2025
Count	1830	1842
Difference		+0.65%

It has a population of 1842 people (31 December 2025).

=== Ethnicity ===
Census 2021 (1+ %)
Ethnicity	Number	Fraction
Slovak	1624	89.42%
Not found out	143	7.87%
Romani	79	4.35%
German	71	3.9%
Total	1816	

In year 2021 was 1816 people by ethnicity 1624 as Slovak, 143 as Not found out, 79 as Romani, 71 as German, 9 as Czech, 3 as Rusyn, 3 as Russian, 2 as Hungarian, 1 as Polish and 1 as Other.

Note on population: The difference values of population numbers in the table "Population statistic" and in the sections "Ethnicity" & "Religion" is caused by the use of various statistical methods.

=== Religion ===
Census 2021 (1+ %)
Religion	Number	Fraction
Roman Catholic Church	1030	56.72%
None	395	21.75%
Evangelical Church	186	10.24%
Not found out	141	7.76%
Greek Catholic Church	40	2.2%
Total	1816	

In year 2021 was 1816 people by religion 1030 from Roman Catholic Church, 395 from None, 186 from Evangelical Church, 141 from Not found out, 40 from Greek Catholic Church, 6 from Other and not ascertained christian church, 4 from Eastern Orthodox Church, 3 from Calvinist Church, 3 from Christian Congregations in Slovakia, 3 from United Methodist Church, 2 from Other, 2 from Ad hoc movements and 1 from Paganism and natural spirituality.
