= Richnava =

Richnava Rihnó
- Municipality
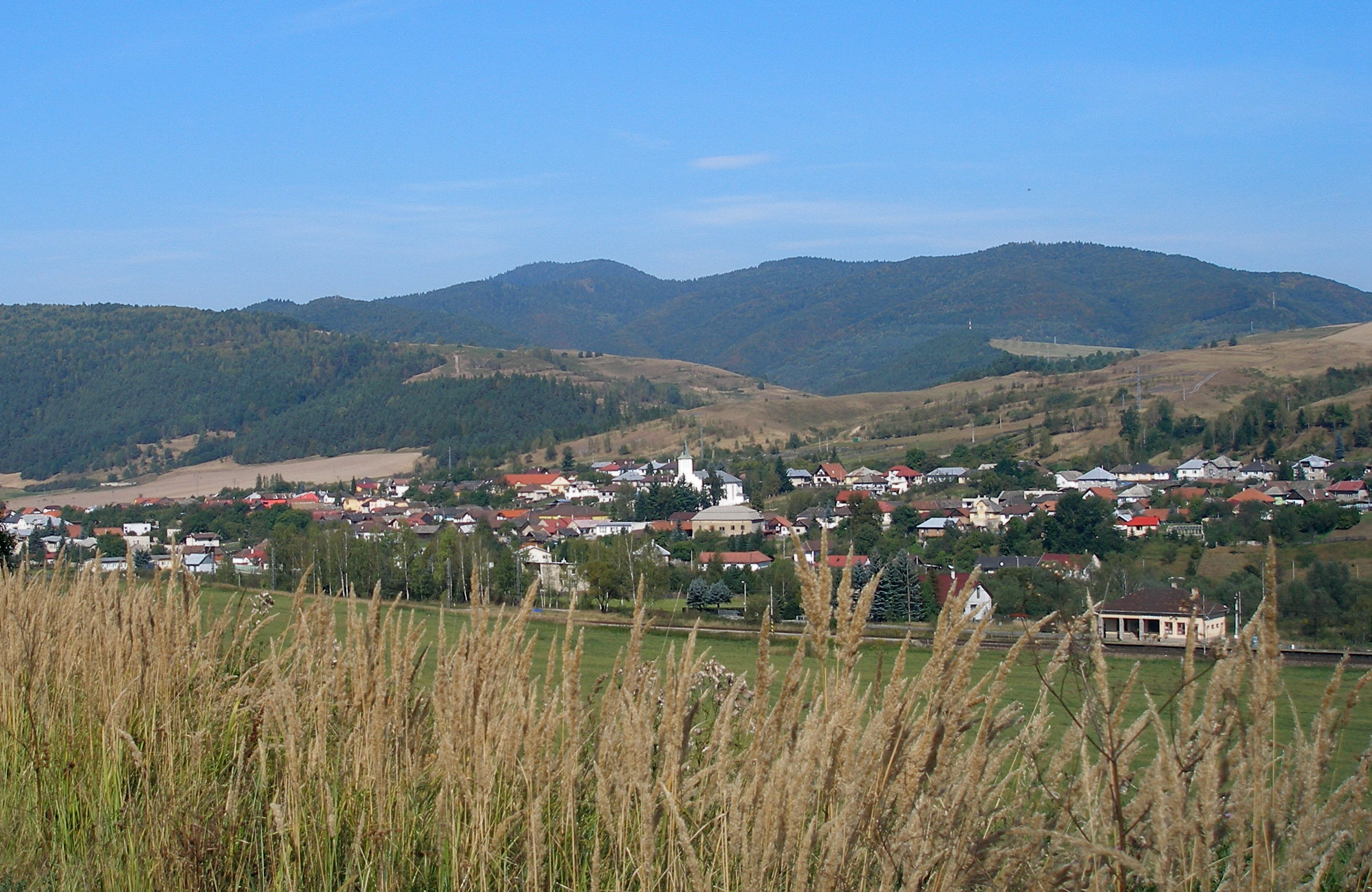

- Flag

- Location of Richnava in the Košice Region Location of Richnava in Slovakia
- Coordinates: 48.93°N 20.92°E
- Country: Slovakia
- Region: Košice Region
- District: Gelnica District
- First mentioned: 1346

Area
  - Total: 6.96 km^{2} (2.69 sq mi)
- Elevation: 370 m (1,210 ft)

Population (2025)
  - Total: 3,634
- Time zone: UTC+1 (CET)
  - Summer (DST): UTC+2 (CEST)
- Postal code: 535 1
- Area code: +421 53
- Vehicle registration plate (until 2022): GL
- Website: www.richnava.sk

Richnava (Hungarian: Rihnó) is a village and municipality in the Gelnica District in the Košice Region of eastern Slovakia. Total municipality population in 2011 was 2,494 inhabitants.

== Geography ==
The municipality lies at an altitude of 370 metres (1,210 ft) and covers an area of 6.96 km^{2} (2.69 sq mi) (2025).

== Population ==
Population statistic (10 years)
Year	1995	2005	2015	2025
Count	1545	2097	2804	3634
Difference		+35.72%	+33.71%	+29.60%

Population statistic
Year	2024	2025
Count	3528	3634
Difference		+3.00%

It has a population of 3634 people (31 December 2025).

=== Ethnicity ===
Census 2021 (1+ %)
Ethnicity	Number	Fraction
Romani	2298	72.46%
Slovak	1862	58.71%
Not found out	118	3.72%
Total	3171	

In year 2021 was 3171 people by ethnicity 2298 as Romani, 1862 as Slovak, 118 as Not found out, 3 as Czech, 1 as Rusyn, 1 as Russian, 1 as Austrian, 1 as German and 1 as Other.

Note on population: The difference values of population numbers in the table "Population statistic" and in the sections "Ethnicity" & "Religion" is caused by the use of various statistical methods.

The vast majority of the municipality's population consists of the local Roma community. In 2019, they constituted an estimated 81% of the local population.

=== Religion ===
Census 2021 (1+ %)
Religion	Number	Fraction
Roman Catholic Church	2227	70.23%
Not found out	625	19.71%
None	211	6.65%
Evangelical Church	49	1.55%
Christian Congregations in Slovakia	38	1.2%
Total	3171	

In year 2021 was 3171 people by religion 2227 from Roman Catholic Church, 625 from Not found out, 211 from None, 49 from Evangelical Church, 38 from Christian Congregations in Slovakia, 5 from Greek Catholic Church, 5 from Ad hoc movements, 3 from Calvinist Church, 2 from Old Catholic Church, 2 from Apostolic Church, 1 from Eastern Orthodox Church, 1 from Paganism and natural spirituality, 1 from Other and 1 from Hinduism.

The vast majority of the local population consists of the local Roma community. In 2019, they constituted an estimated 81% of the local population.
