= Stará Voda, Gelnica District =

Stará Voda Altwasser
- Municipality
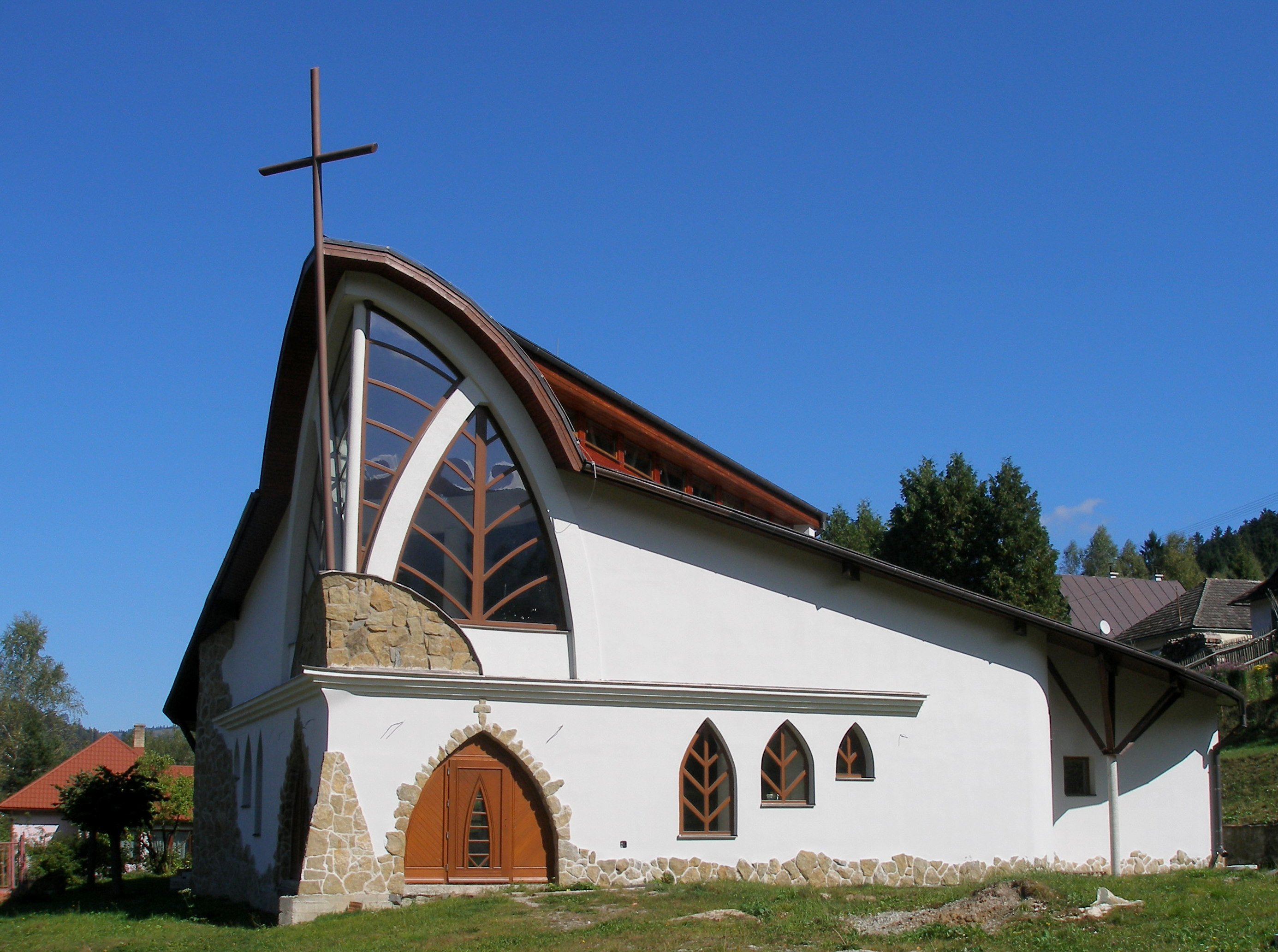

- Flag

- Location of Stará Voda in the Košice Region Location of Stará Voda in Slovakia
- Coordinates: 48.80°N 20.68°E
- Country: Slovakia
- Region: Košice Region
- District: Gelnica District
- First mentioned: 1828

Area
  - Total: 3.28 km^{2} (1.27 sq mi)
- Elevation: 521 m (1,709 ft)

Population (2025)
  - Total: 184
- Time zone: UTC+1 (CET)
  - Summer (DST): UTC+2 (CEST)
- Postal code: 533 4
- Area code: +421 53
- Vehicle registration plate (until 2022): GL
- Website: staravoda.sk

Stará Voda (German: Altwasser; Hungarian: Óvíz) is a village and municipality in the Gelnica District in the Košice Region of eastern Slovakia. Total municipality population was in 2011 224 inhabitants. It belonged to a German language island. The German population was expelled in 1945.

== Population ==
Population statistic (10 years)
Year	1995	2005	2015	2025
Count	220	232	215	184
Difference		+5.45%	−7.32%	−14.41%

Population statistic
Year	2024	2025
Count	182	184
Difference		+1.09%

It has a population of 184 people (31 December 2025).

=== Ethnicity ===
Census 2021 (1+ %)
Ethnicity	Number	Fraction
Slovak	188	98.94%
Rusyn	4	2.1%
Not found out	2	1.05%
Total	190	

In year 2021 was 190 people by ethnicity 188 as Slovak, 4 as Rusyn, 2 as Not found out and 1 as Czech.

Note on population: The difference values of population numbers in the table "Population statistic" and in the sections "Ethnicity" & "Religion" is caused by the use of various statistical methods.

=== Religion ===
Census 2021 (1+ %)
Religion	Number	Fraction
Roman Catholic Church	169	88.95%
None	8	4.21%
Evangelical Church	7	3.68%
Greek Catholic Church	4	2.11%
Not found out	2	1.05%
Total	190	

In year 2021 was 190 people by religion 169 from Roman Catholic Church, 8 from None, 7 from Evangelical Church, 4 from Greek Catholic Church and 2 from Not found out.
