= Žakarovce =

- Municipality
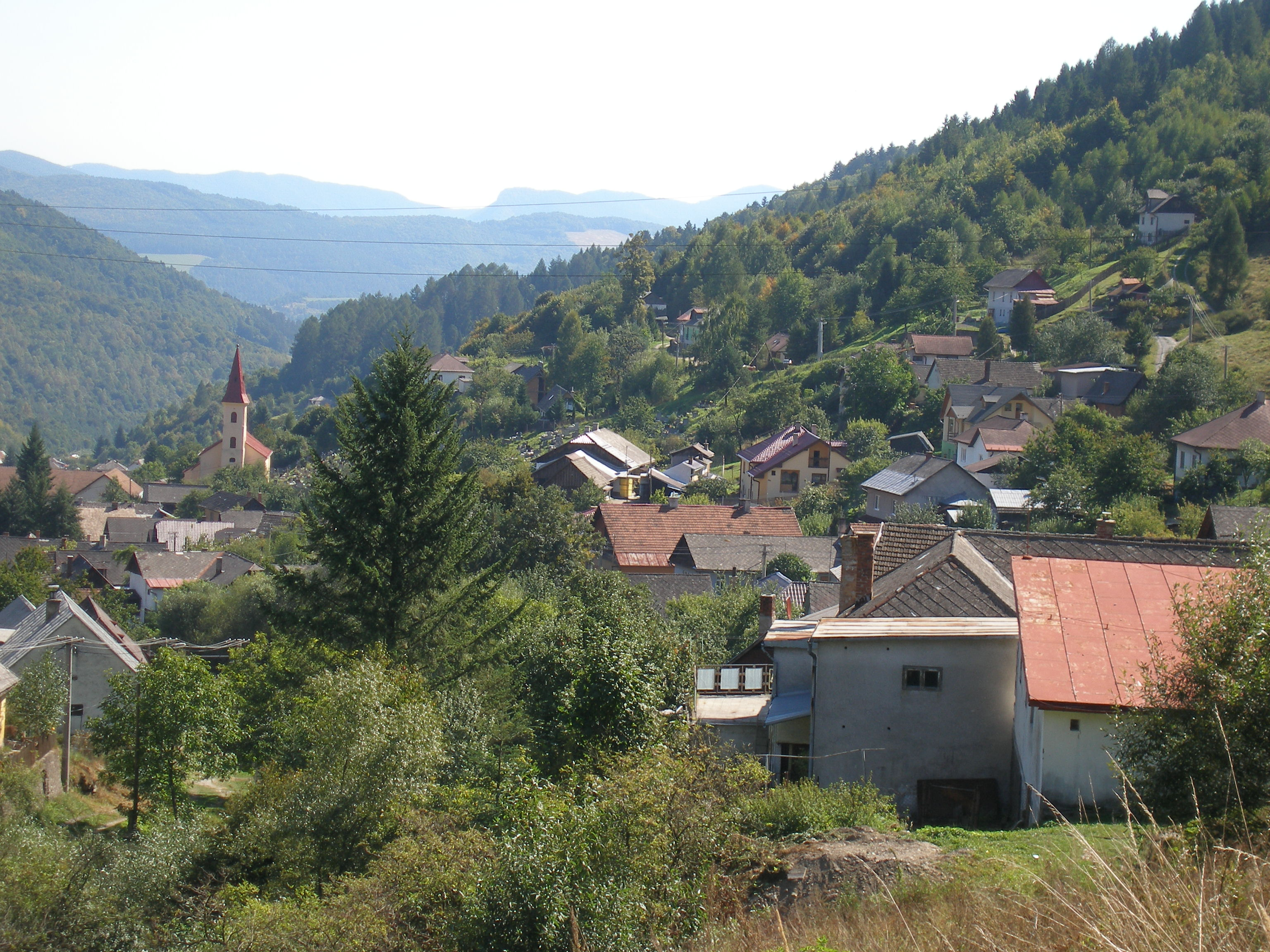

- Location of Žakarovce in the Košice Region Location of Žakarovce in Slovakia
- Coordinates: 48.88°N 20.93°E
- Country: Slovakia
- Region: Košice Region
- District: Gelnica District
- First mentioned: 1368

Area
  - Total: 8.61 km^{2} (3.32 sq mi)
- Elevation: 533 m (1,749 ft)

Population (2025)
  - Total: 678
- Time zone: UTC+1 (CET)
  - Summer (DST): UTC+2 (CEST)
- Postal code: 557 1
- Area code: +421 53
- Vehicle registration plate (until 2022): GL
- Website: www.zakarovce.sk/sk/

Žakarovce is a village and municipality in the Gelnica District in the Košice Region of eastern Slovakia. In 2011 the village had 723 inhabitants.

== Geography ==
The municipality lies at an altitude of 533 metres (1,749 ft) and covers an area of 8.61 km^{2} (3.32 sq mi) (2025).

== Population ==
Population statistic (10 years)
Year	1995	2005	2015	2025
Count	738	742	757	678
Difference		+0.54%	+2.02%	−10.43%

Population statistic
Year	2024	2025
Count	676	678
Difference		+0.29%

It has a population of 678 people (31 December 2025).

=== Ethnicity ===
Census 2021 (1+ %)
Ethnicity	Number	Fraction
Slovak	674	96.42%
Romani	129	18.45%
Not found out	23	3.29%
Total	699	

In year 2021 was 699 people by ethnicity 674 as Slovak, 129 as Romani, 23 as Not found out, 2 as Czech, 2 as Rusyn, 1 as Russian and 1 as Polish.

Note on population: The difference values of population numbers in the table "Population statistic" and in the sections "Ethnicity" & "Religion" is caused by the use of various statistical methods.

=== Religion ===
Census 2021 (1+ %)
Religion	Number	Fraction
Roman Catholic Church	532	76.11%
None	125	17.88%
Not found out	22	3.15%
Eastern Orthodox Church	8	1.14%
Greek Catholic Church	7	1%
Total	699	

In year 2021 was 699 people by religion 532 from Roman Catholic Church, 125 from None, 22 from Not found out, 8 from Eastern Orthodox Church, 7 from Greek Catholic Church, 4 from Evangelical Church and 1 from Other.
