= Kojšov =

Kojšov Kojsó
- Municipality
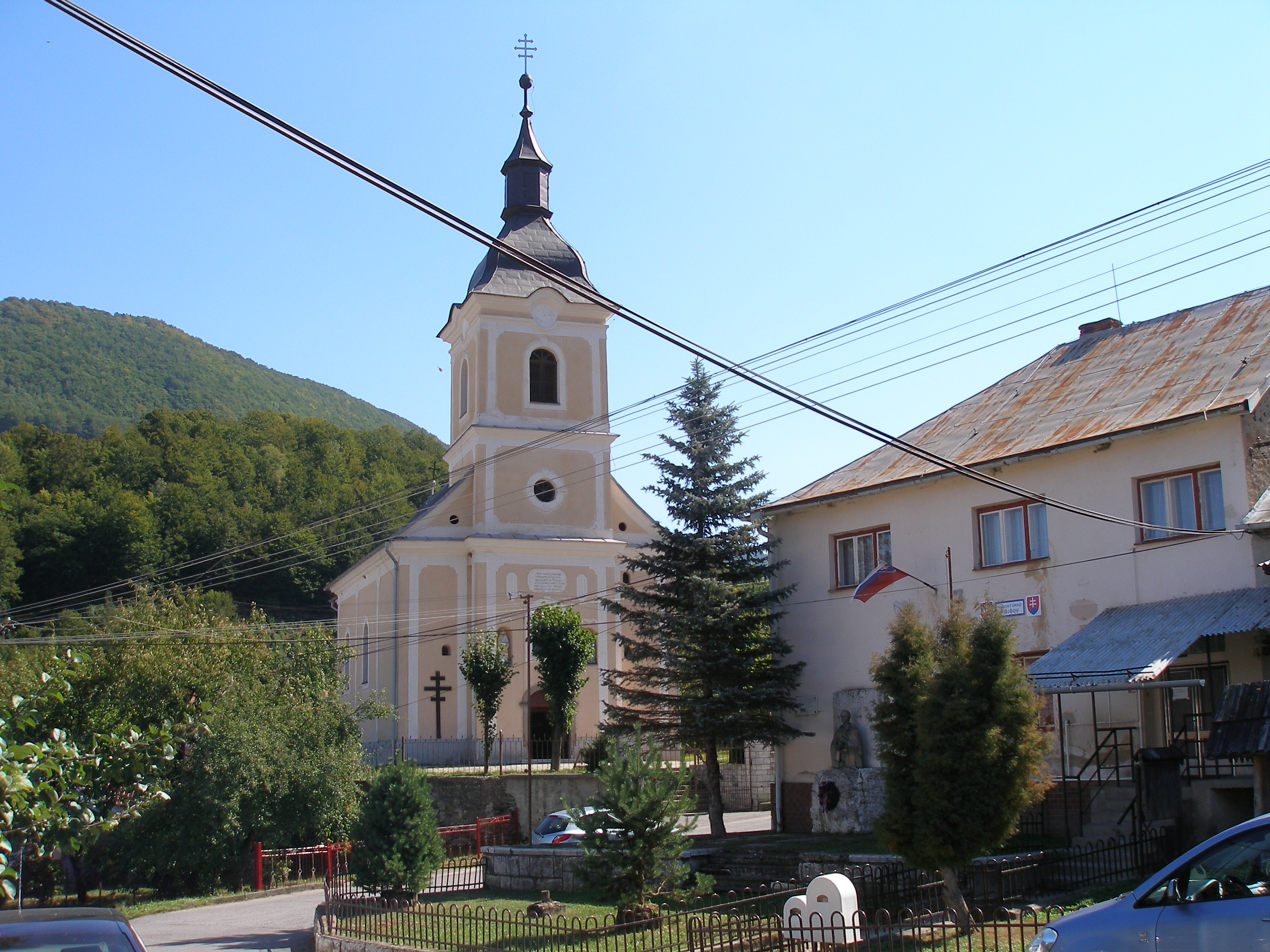

- Flag

- Location of Kojšov in the Košice Region Location of Kojšov in Slovakia
- Coordinates: 48.82°N 21.00°E
- Country: Slovakia
- Region: Košice Region
- District: Gelnica District
- First mentioned: 1368

Area
  - Total: 31.80 km^{2} (12.28 sq mi)
- Elevation: 463 m (1,519 ft)

Population (2025)
  - Total: 676
- Time zone: UTC+1 (CET)
  - Summer (DST): UTC+2 (CEST)
- Postal code: 555 2
- Area code: +421 53
- Vehicle registration plate (until 2022): GL
- Website: www.kojsov.sk

Kojšov (Hungarian: Kojsó) is a village and municipality in the Gelnica District in the Košice Region of eastern Slovakia. In 2011 had total municipality a population of 736 inhabitants. Near Kojšov are located natural sightseeings Kojšovská Hoľa /hill/ and Folkmarská Skala /stone sculpture/, as well as Lukáčova Jaskyňa/cave/. The village and the surroundings has many holiday homes where people from Košice go at the weekends and relax.

== Geography ==
The municipality lies at an altitude of 463 metres (1,519 ft) and covers an area of 31.80 km^{2} (12.28 sq mi) (2025).

Kojšov is located west from Košice in a hilly area; total height above sea level varies from 425 to 614 meters.

== Population ==
Population statistic (10 years)
Year	1995	2005	2015	2025
Count	780	751	712	676
Difference		−3.71%	−5.19%	−5.05%

Population statistic
Year	2024	2025
Count	690	676
Difference		−2.02%

It has a population of 676 people (31 December 2025).

=== Ethnicity ===
Census 2021 (1+ %)
Ethnicity	Number	Fraction
Slovak	679	97.41%
Rusyn	16	2.29%
Not found out	9	1.29%
Romani	8	1.14%
Total	697	

In year 2021 was 697 people by ethnicity 679 as Slovak, 16 as Rusyn, 9 as Not found out, 8 as Romani, 4 as Czech, 1 as Jewish, 1 as Ukrainian and 1 as Russian.

Note on population: The difference values of population numbers in the table "Population statistic" and in the sections "Ethnicity" & "Religion" is caused by the use of various statistical methods.

=== Religion ===
Census 2021 (1+ %)
Religion	Number	Fraction
Greek Catholic Church	444	63.7%
Roman Catholic Church	151	21.66%
None	53	7.6%
Eastern Orthodox Church	31	4.45%
Not found out	10	1.43%
Total	697	

In year 2021 was 697 people by religion 444 from Greek Catholic Church, 151 from Roman Catholic Church, 53 from None, 31 from Eastern Orthodox Church, 10 from Not found out, 5 from Evangelical Church, 1 from Calvinist Church, 1 from Buddhism and 1 from Ad hoc movements.

== History ==
The main occupation of the locals was the forest industry and sawmills.

== Notable persons ==
- Juraj Jakubisko, film director
- Benjamin Orr, musician from the Cars

== See also ==
- List of municipalities and towns in Slovakia
