= Smolnícka Huta =

Smolnícka Huta Szomolnokhuta
- Municipality
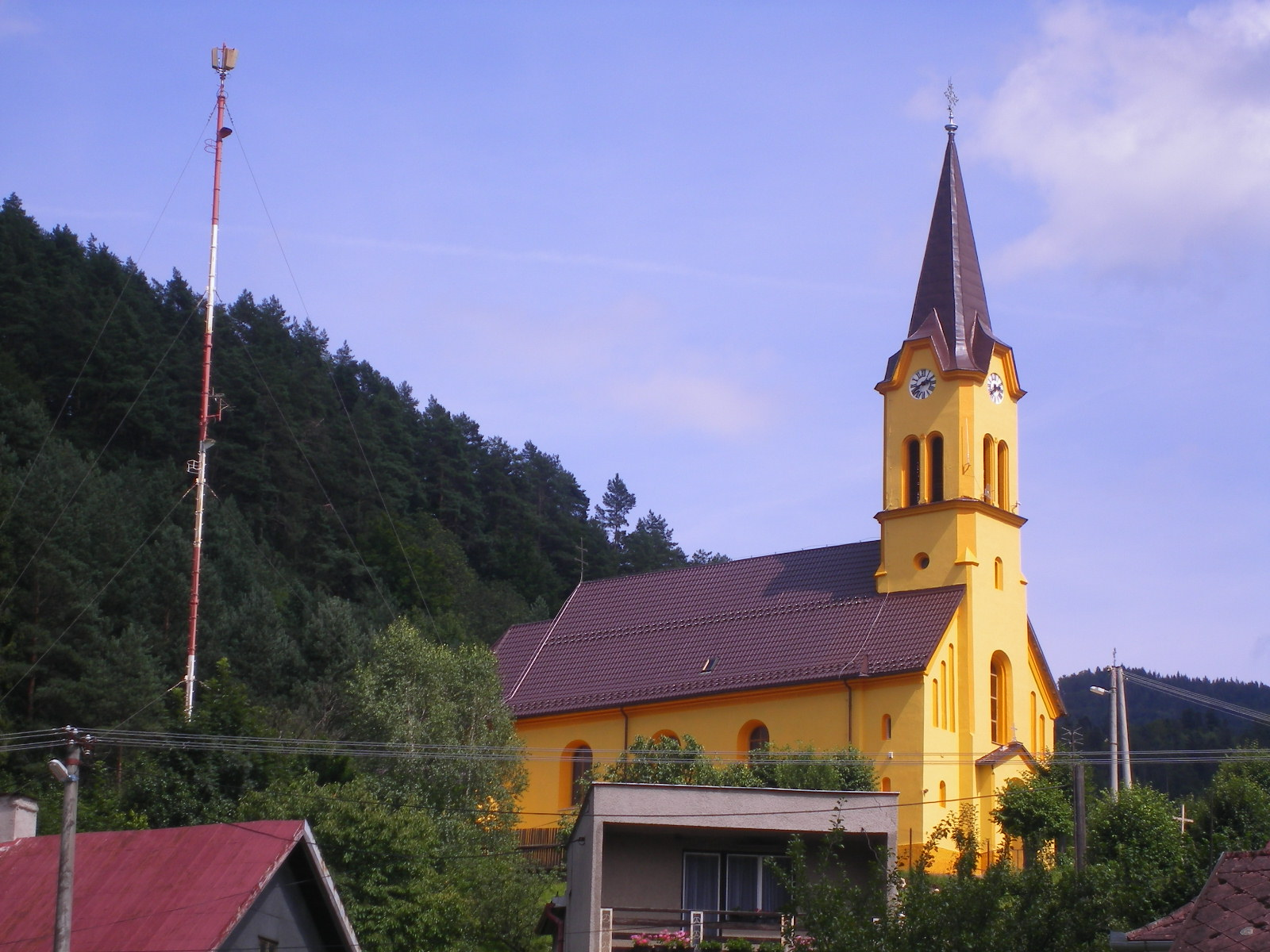

- Flag

- Location of Smolnícka Huta in the Košice Region Location of Smolnícka Huta in Slovakia
- Coordinates: 48.75°N 20.78°E
- Country: Slovakia
- Region: Košice Region
- District: Gelnica District
- First mentioned: 1828

Area
  - Total: 37.32 km^{2} (14.41 sq mi)
- Elevation: 495 m (1,624 ft)

Population (2025)
  - Total: 470
- Time zone: UTC+1 (CET)
  - Summer (DST): UTC+2 (CEST)
- Postal code: 556 5
- Area code: +421 53
- Vehicle registration plate (until 2022): GL
- Website: www.smolnickahuta.sk

Smolnícka Huta (German: Schmöllnitzhütte, Hungarian: Szomolnokhuta) is a village and municipality in the Gelnica District in the Košice Region of eastern Slovakia. Total municipality population was in 2011 486 inhabitants. It belonged to a German language island. The German population was expelled in 1945.

== Geography ==
The municipality lies at an altitude of 495 metres (1,624 ft) and covers an area of 37.32 km^{2} (14.41 sq mi) (2025).

== Population ==
Population statistic (10 years)
Year	1995	2005	2015	2025
Count	461	477	470	470
Difference		+3.47%	−1.46%	+0%

Population statistic
Year	2024	2025
Count	470	470
Difference		+0%

It has a population of 470 people (31 December 2025).

=== Ethnicity ===
Census 2021 (1+ %)
Ethnicity	Number	Fraction
Slovak	432	89.07%
German	46	9.48%
Not found out	29	5.97%
Romani	19	3.91%
Czech	5	1.03%
Total	485	

In year 2021 was 485 people by ethnicity 432 as Slovak, 46 as German, 29 as Not found out, 19 as Romani, 5 as Czech, 4 as Other, 1 as Rusyn, 1 as Polish and 1 as Hungarian.

Note on population: The difference values of population numbers in the table "Population statistic" and in the sections "Ethnicity" & "Religion" is caused by the use of various statistical methods.

=== Religion ===
Census 2021 (1+ %)
Religion	Number	Fraction
Roman Catholic Church	329	67.84%
None	97	20%
Not found out	28	5.77%
Evangelical Church	23	4.74%
Greek Catholic Church	5	1.03%
Total	485	

In year 2021 was 485 people by religion 329 from Roman Catholic Church, 97 from None, 28 from Not found out, 23 from Evangelical Church, 5 from Greek Catholic Church, 1 from Calvinist Church, 1 from Paganism and natural spirituality and 1 from Christian Congregations in Slovakia.
