= Hrišovce =

Hrišovce Gyónfalva
- Municipality
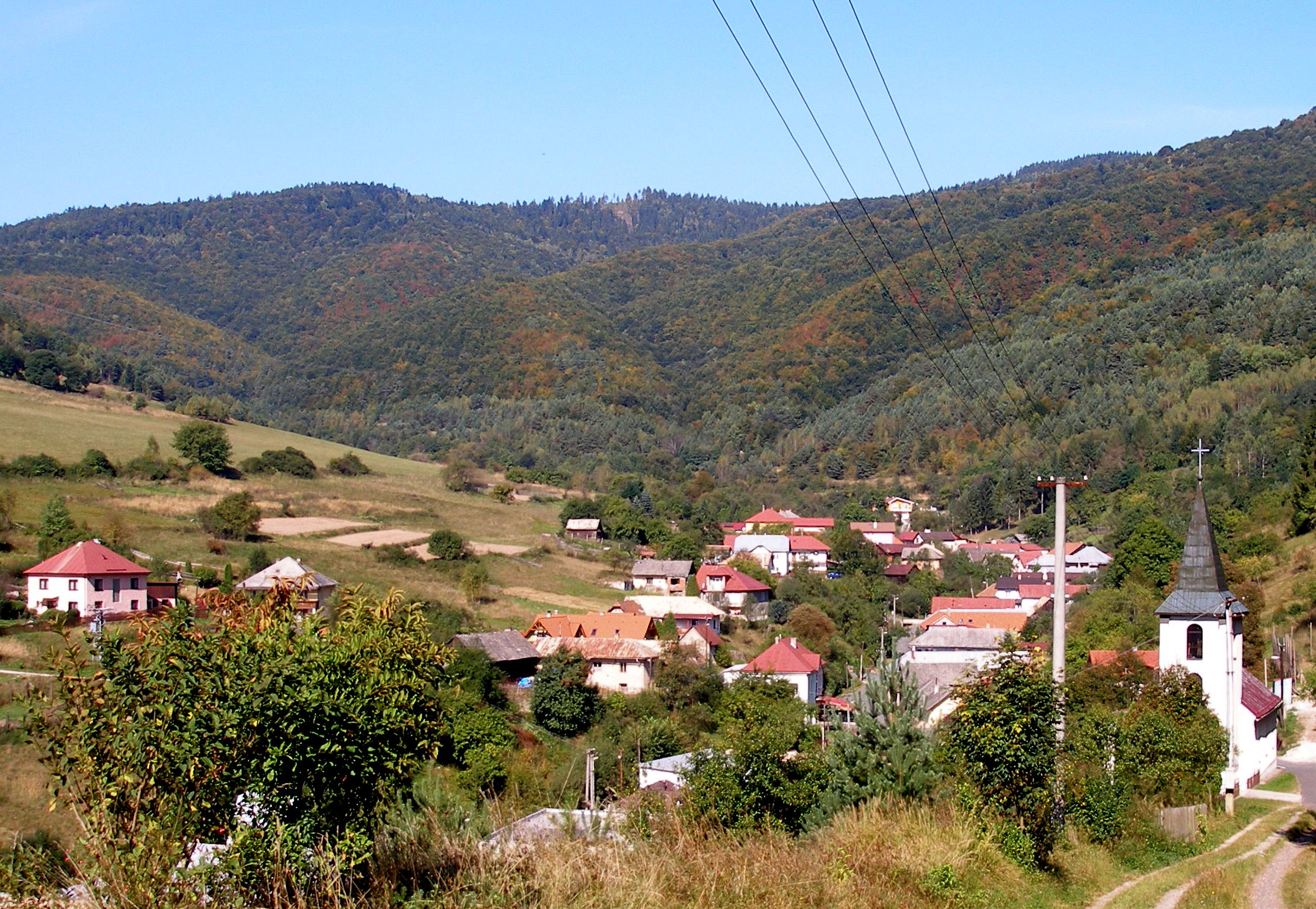

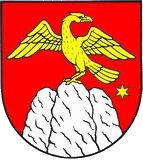
- Flag Coat of arms

- Location of Hrišovce in the Košice Region Location of Hrišovce in Slovakia
- Coordinates: 48.95°N 20.92°E
- Country: Slovakia
- Region: Košice Region
- District: Gelnica District
- First mentioned: 1311

Area
  - Total: 7.94 km^{2} (3.07 sq mi)
- Elevation: 468 m (1,535 ft)

Population (2025)
  - Total: 278
- Time zone: UTC+1 (CET)
  - Summer (DST): UTC+2 (CEST)
- Postal code: 535 1
- Area code: +421 53
- Vehicle registration plate (until 2022): GL
- Website: www.hrisovce.sk

Hrišovce (Hungarian: Gyónfalva) is a village and municipality in the Gelnica District in the Košice Region of eastern Slovakia. The municipality had, in 2019, a population of 303 inhabitants.

== See also ==
- List of municipalities and towns in Slovakia

== Geography ==
The municipality lies at an altitude of 468 metres (1,535 ft) and covers an area of 7.94 km^{2} (3.07 sq mi) (2025).

== Population ==
Population statistic (10 years)
Year	1995	2005	2015	2025
Count	318	308	319	278
Difference		−3.14%	+3.57%	−12.85%

Population statistic
Year	2024	2025
Count	280	278
Difference		−0.71%

It has a population of 278 people (31 December 2025).

=== Ethnicity ===
Census 2021 (1+ %)
Ethnicity	Number	Fraction
Slovak	281	98.59%
Czech	5	1.75%
Not found out	4	1.4%
Total	285	

In year 2021 was 285 people by ethnicity 281 as Slovak, 5 as Czech, 4 as Not found out, 1 as Polish, 1 as Moravian, 1 as Other and 1 as Albanian.

Note on population: The difference values of population numbers in the table "Population statistic" and in the sections "Ethnicity" & "Religion" is caused by the use of various statistical methods.

=== Religion ===
Census 2021 (1+ %)
Religion	Number	Fraction
Roman Catholic Church	274	96.14%
None	5	1.75%
Greek Catholic Church	3	1.05%
Total	285	

In year 2021 was 285 people by religion 274 from Roman Catholic Church, 5 from None, 3 from Greek Catholic Church, 1 from Not found out, 1 from Christian Congregations in Slovakia and 1 from Other.

== Genealogical resources ==
The records for genealogical research are available at the state archive "Statny Archiv in Levoca, Slovakia"

- Roman Catholic church records (births/marriages/deaths): 1722-1918 (parish B)
