= Smižany =

Smižany Smižany
- Municipality
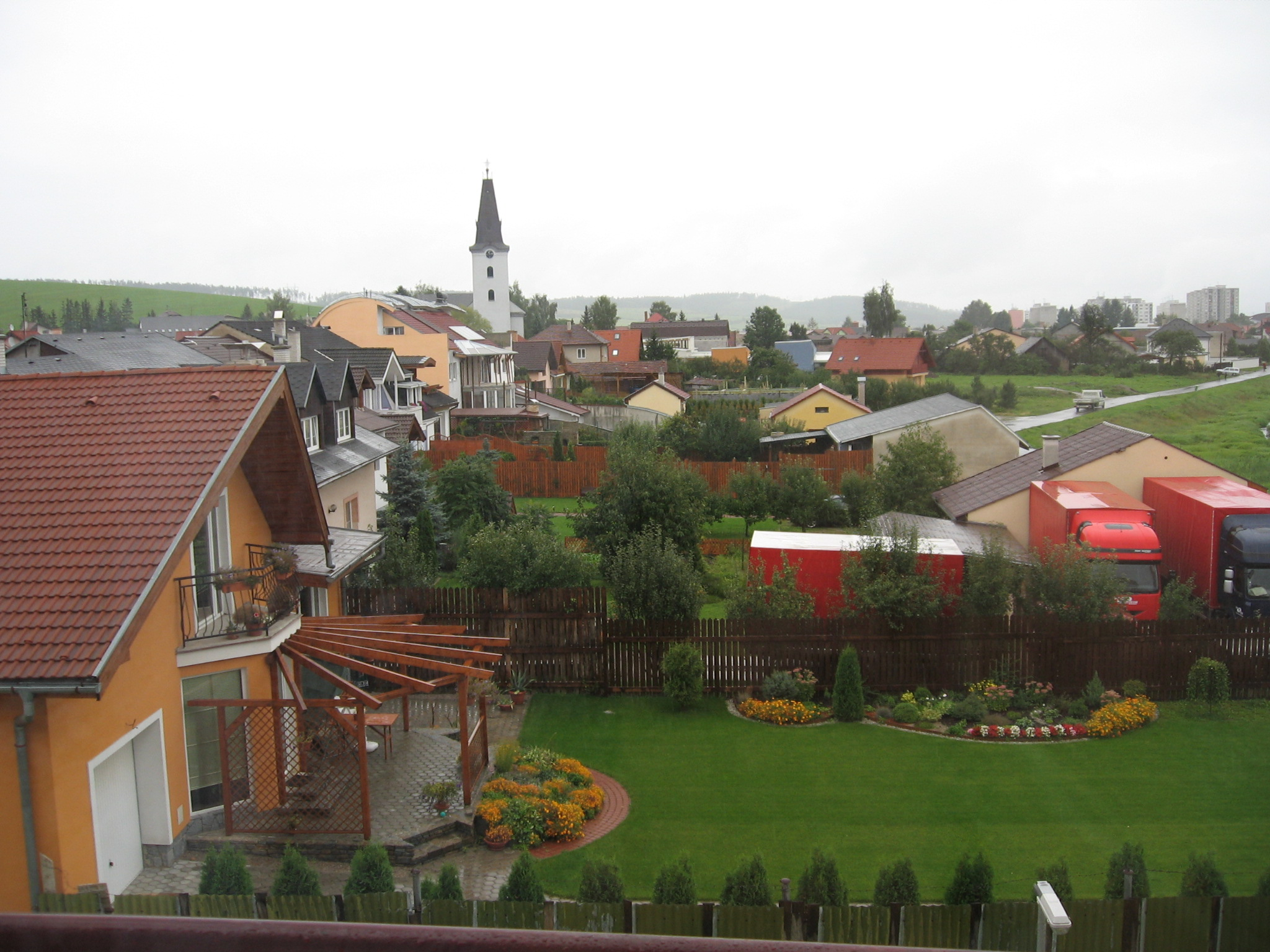

- Flag Coat of arms

- Location of Smižany in the Košice Region Location of Smižany in Slovakia
- Coordinates: 48.96°N 20.53°E
- Country: Slovakia
- Region: Košice Region
- District: Spišská Nová Ves District
- First mentioned: 1246

Area
  - Total: 45.70 km^{2} (17.64 sq mi)
- Elevation: 479 m (1,572 ft)

Population (2025)
  - Total: 8,783
- Time zone: UTC+1 (CET)
  - Summer (DST): UTC+2 (CEST)
- Postal code: 531 1
- Area code: +421 53
- Vehicle registration plate (until 2022): SN
- Website: www.smizany.sk

Smižany (Hungarian: Szepessümeg, German: Schmögen) is a large village and municipality in the Spišská Nová Ves District in the Košice Region of central-eastern Slovakia.

With a population of over 8,500 people as of 2021, Smižany is the second largest village in Slovakia (a village being defined as a municipality that does not have town status). Smižany is situated directly adjacent to the town of Spišská Nová Ves and the two municipalities form a contiguous urban area, one of the main population centers in Eastern Slovakia.

== History ==
Excavations in Čingov, just south of the village, have found traces of Stone Age settlement. The village was settled by German settlers in 1242. There is a Romanesque church of the 13th century.

== Geography ==
The municipality lies at an altitude of 479 metres (1,572 ft) and covers an area of 45.70 km^{2} (17.64 sq mi) (2025).

== Population ==
Population statistic (10 years)
Year	1995	2005	2015	2025
Count	6775	8423	8633	8783
Difference		+24.32%	+2.49%	+1.73%

Population statistic
Year	2024	2025
Count	8825	8783
Difference		−0.47%

It has a population of 8783 people (31 December 2025).

=== Ethnicity ===
Census 2021 (1+ %)
Ethnicity	Number	Fraction
Slovak	7884	89.2%
Not found out	810	9.16%
Romani	442	5%
Total	8838	

In year 2021 was 8838 people by ethnicity 7884 as Slovak, 810 as Not found out, 442 as Romani, 50 as Rusyn, 31 as Czech, 26 as Other, 13 as Polish, 9 as German, 8 as Ukrainian, 8 as Russian, 8 as Hungarian, 3 as Chinese, 3 as English, 2 as Irish, 2 as Vietnamese, 2 as Austrian, 1 as Jewish, 1 as Italian and 1 as Bulgarian.

Note on population: The difference values of population numbers in the table "Population statistic" and in the sections "Ethnicity" & "Religion" is caused by the use of various statistical methods.

The municipality has a significant Roma community. In 2019, they constituted an estimated 32% of the local population, or 2898 people, concentrated in the settlement outside of the municipal core.

=== Religion ===
Census 2021 (1+ %)
Religion	Number	Fraction
Roman Catholic Church	6093	68.94%
None	1279	14.47%
Not found out	764	8.64%
Evangelical Church	287	3.25%
Greek Catholic Church	190	2.15%
Total	8838	

In year 2021 was 8838 people by religion 6093 from Roman Catholic Church, 1279 from None, 764 from Not found out, 287 from Evangelical Church, 190 from Greek Catholic Church, 79 from Christian Congregations in Slovakia, 26 from Ad hoc movements, 24 from Other and not ascertained christian church, 18 from Eastern Orthodox Church, 14 from Other, 12 from Calvinist Church, 12 from Church of the Brethren, 11 from Jehovah's Witnesses, 9 from Buddhism, 9 from Apostolic Church, 4 from Church of Jesus Christ of Latter-day Saints, 3 from Paganism and natural spirituality, 2 from Old Catholic Church, 1 from Islam and 1 from United Methodist Church.

== Cultural attractions ==
- Čingov castle, an archaeological site that encompasses a set of Slavic forts from the 9th century. Monuments found in the castle confirm the settlement was founded during the Stone Age. The name The castle was composed of an acropolis on the cliff and a smaller fort on the western and northeastern parts. During the examination of the main area under the castle, the northern rampart and 90 m of the western rampart were almost completely exposed. Archaeological excavations continue to be performed at this location.

== Twin towns — sister cities ==
Smižany is twinned with:

- Borsodnádasd, Hungary
- Kamienica, Poland
- Komorniki, Poland
