= Závadka, Gelnica District =

Závadka Görögfalu
- Municipality
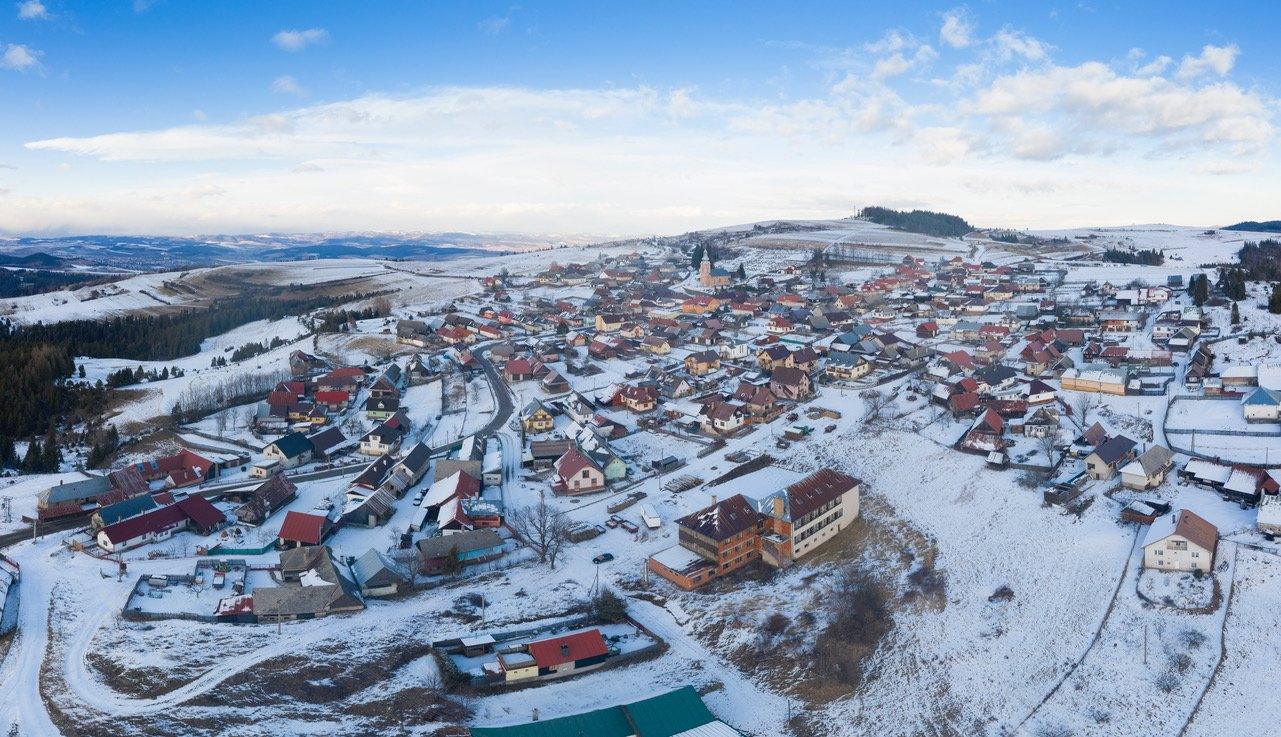

- Flag

- Location of Závadka in the Košice Region Location of Závadka in Slovakia
- Coordinates: 48.87°N 20.62°E
- Country: Slovakia
- Region: Košice Region
- District: Gelnica District
- First mentioned: 1352

Area
  - Total: 22.42 km^{2} (8.66 sq mi)
- Elevation: 819 m (2,687 ft)

Population (2025)
  - Total: 636
- Time zone: UTC+1 (CET)
  - Summer (DST): UTC+2 (CEST)
- Postal code: 533 3
- Area code: +421 53
- Vehicle registration plate (until 2022): GL
- Website: zavadkanaspisi.sk

Závadka (Hungarian: Görögfalu) is a village and municipality in the Gelnica District in the Košice Region of eastern Slovakia.

== Population ==
Population statistic (10 years)
Year	1995	2005	2015	2025
Count	551	611	613	636
Difference		+10.88%	+0.32%	+3.75%

Population statistic
Year	2024	2025
Count	634	636
Difference		+0.31%

It has a population of 636 people (31 December 2025).

=== Ethnicity ===
Census 2021 (1+ %)
Ethnicity	Number	Fraction
Slovak	464	77.59%
Rusyn	189	31.6%
Romani	50	8.36%
Not found out	14	2.34%
Total	598	

In year 2021 was 598 people by ethnicity 464 as Slovak, 189 as Rusyn, 50 as Romani and 14 as Not found out.

Note on population: The difference values of population numbers in the table "Population statistic" and in the sections "Ethnicity" & "Religion" is caused by the use of various statistical methods.

=== Religion ===
Census 2021 (1+ %)
Religion	Number	Fraction
Greek Catholic Church	442	73.91%
Eastern Orthodox Church	90	15.05%
Roman Catholic Church	33	5.52%
None	18	3.01%
Not found out	12	2.01%
Total	598	

In year 2021 was 598 people by religion 442 from Greek Catholic Church, 90 from Eastern Orthodox Church, 33 from Roman Catholic Church, 18 from None, 12 from Not found out, 1 from Jehovah's Witnesses, 1 from Seventh-day Adventist Church and 1 from Ad hoc movements.
