= Kluknava =

Kluknava Kluknó
- Municipality
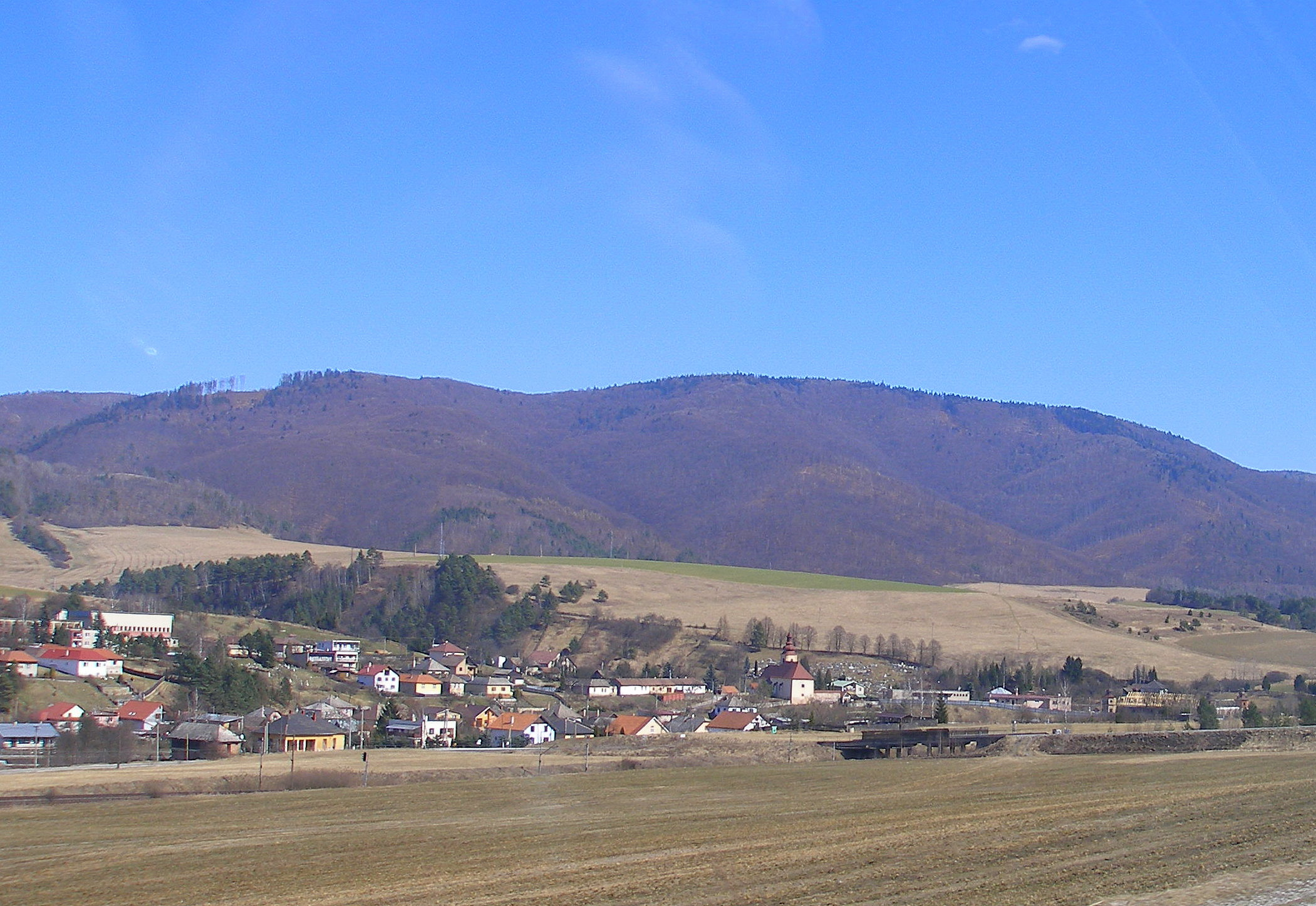

- Location of Kluknava in the Košice Region Location of Kluknava in Slovakia
- Coordinates: 48.92°N 20.95°E
- Country: Slovakia
- Region: Košice Region
- District: Gelnica District
- First mentioned: 1304

Area
  - Total: 33.95 km^{2} (13.11 sq mi)
- Elevation: 361 m (1,184 ft)

Population (2025)
  - Total: 1,527
- Time zone: UTC+1 (CET)
  - Summer (DST): UTC+2 (CEST)
- Postal code: 535 1
- Area code: +421 53
- Vehicle registration plate (until 2022): GL
- Website: www.kluknava.sk

Kluknava (Hungarian: Kluknó) is a village and municipality in the Gelnica District in the Košice Region of eastern Slovakia. In 2011 had been total municipality population 1604 inhabitants.

== See also ==
- List of municipalities and towns in Slovakia

== Geography ==
The municipality lies at an altitude of 361 metres (1,184 ft) and covers an area of 33.95 km^{2} (13.11 sq mi) (2025).

== Population ==
Population statistic (10 years)
Year	1995	2005	2015	2025
Count	1719	1639	1575	1527
Difference		−4.65%	−3.90%	−3.04%

Population statistic
Year	2024	2025
Count	1530	1527
Difference		−0.19%

It has a population of 1527 people (31 December 2025).

=== Ethnicity ===
Census 2021 (1+ %)
Ethnicity	Number	Fraction
Slovak	1492	97.64%
Not found out	33	2.15%
Total	1528	

In year 2021 was 1528 people by ethnicity 1492 as Slovak, 33 as Not found out, 9 as Czech, 8 as Other, 5 as Rusyn, 4 as Russian, 3 as Italian, 1 as Polish and 1 as English.

Note on population: The difference values of population numbers in the table "Population statistic" and in the sections "Ethnicity" & "Religion" is caused by the use of various statistical methods.

=== Religion ===
Census 2021 (1+ %)
Religion	Number	Fraction
Roman Catholic Church	1285	84.1%
None	148	9.69%
Not found out	46	3.01%
Greek Catholic Church	19	1.24%
Total	1528	

In year 2021 was 1528 people by religion 1285 from Roman Catholic Church, 148 from None, 46 from Not found out, 19 from Greek Catholic Church, 8 from Eastern Orthodox Church, 6 from Evangelical Church, 6 from Ad hoc movements, 3 from Other, 2 from Buddhism, 2 from Apostolic Church, 1 from Calvinist Church, 1 from Other and not ascertained christian church and 1 from Christian Congregations in Slovakia.

== Genealogical resources ==
The records for genealogical research are available at the state archive "Statny Archiv in Levoca, Slovakia"

- Roman Catholic church records (births/marriages/deaths): 1722-1918 (parish A)

The genealogy of several families including The Terpak and Vascak surnames can be found at *Official homepage Official homepage
