= Gelnica District =

Coordinates: 48°51′7″N 20°56′2″E

- District
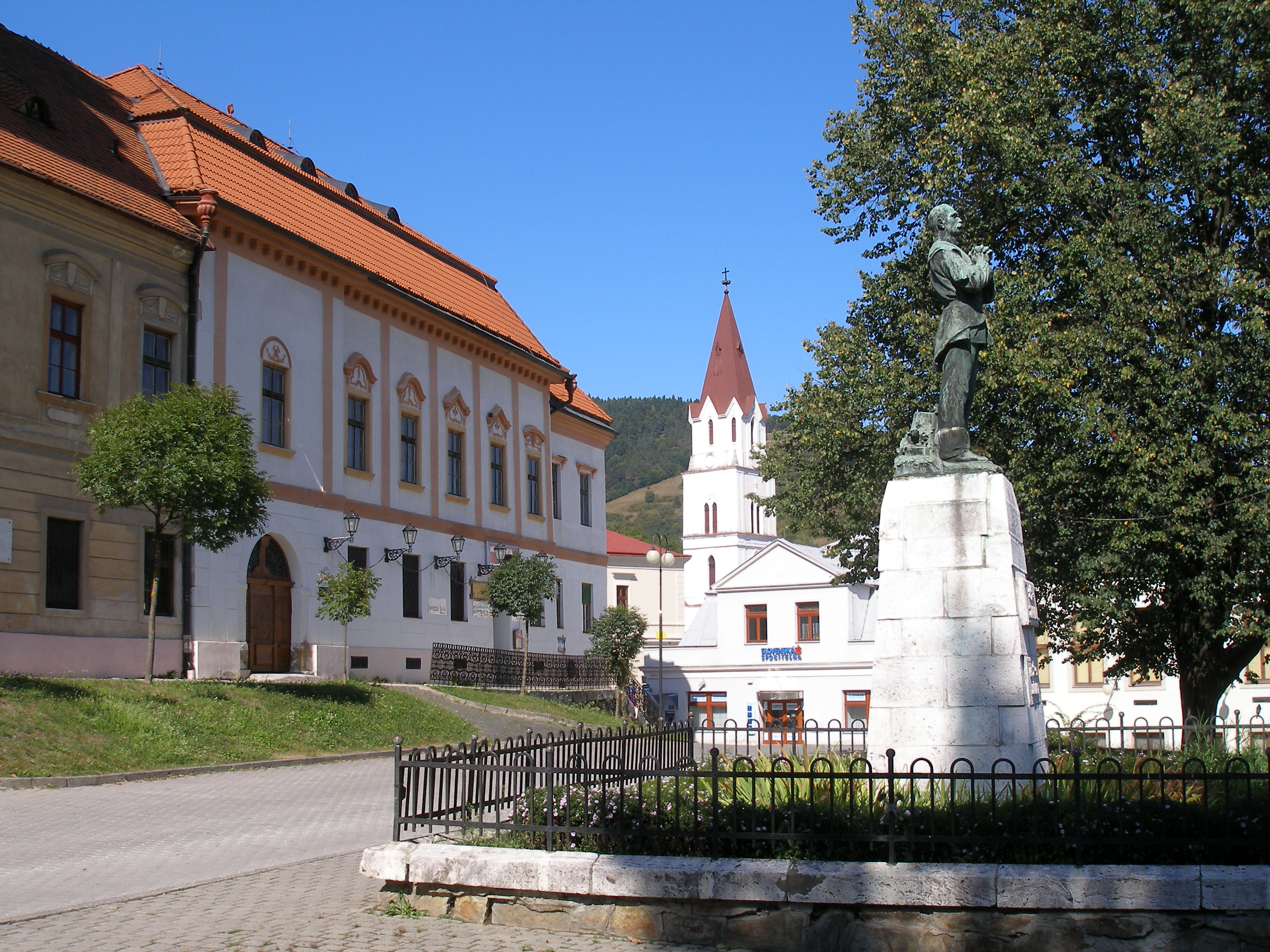
- Country: Slovakia
- Region (kraj): Košice Region
- Seat: Gelnica

Area
  - Total: 584.33 km^{2} (225.61 sq mi)

Population (2025)
  - Total: 31,884
- Time zone: UTC+1 (CET)
  - Summer (DST): UTC+2 (CEST)
- Telephone prefix: 053
- Vehicle registration plate (until 2022): GL
- Municipalities: 20

Gelnica (district) (Slovak: okres Gelnica, Hungarian: Gölnicbányai járás) is a district in the Košice Region of eastern Slovakia. It was established in 1923. Between 1960–1996 the district has been a part of the Spišská Nová Ves District. Then, in 1996 the Gelnica District was established in its present borders. It is the district with the highest percentage of forest area in Slovakia, 74,6%. The district's center is its biggest town, Gelnica. Geographically, the district is situated within the Slovak Ore Mountains (Slovenské rudohorie), largely defined by the Hnilec river valley. Historically known for its rich mining heritage—particularly copper, silver, and iron ore extraction dating back to the Middle Ages—the region transitioned toward forestry, wood processing, and light manufacturing following the decline of local mineral exploitation.

== Population ==
Population statistic (10 years)
Year	1995	2005	2015	2025
Count	30,004	30,982	31,627	31,884
Difference		+3.25%	+2.08%	+0.81%

Population statistic
Year	2024	2025
Count	31,787	31,884
Difference		+0.30%

It has a population of 31,884 people (31 December 2025).

Historical population
Year	Pop.	±%
1970	31,981	—
1980	31,460	−1.6%
1991	29,833	−5.2%
2001	30,841	+3.4%
2011	31,272	+1.4%
2021	31,698	+1.4%
Source: Statistical Office of the Slovak Republic

=== Ethnicity ===
Census 2021 (1+ %)
Ethnicity	Number	Fraction
Slovak	28,447	82.79%
Romani	3500	10.18%
Not found out	1401	4.07%
Rusyn	403	1.17%
Total	34,359	

In year 2021 was 34,359 people by ethnicity 28,447 as Slovak, 3500 as Romani, 1401 as Not found out, 403 as Rusyn, 282 as German, 117 as Czech, 50 as Other, 46 as Ukrainian, 34 as Hungarian, 22 as Russian, 10 as Vietnamese, 9 as Polish, 6 as Chinese, 6 as English, 5 as Italian, 4 as Jewish, 4 as Turkish, 3 as Croatian, 2 as Romanian, 2 as Austrian, 2 as Canadian, 1 as Irish, 1 as Moravian, 1 as Greek and 1 as Albanian.

Note on population: The difference values of population numbers in the table "Population statistic" and in the sections "Ethnicity" & "Religion" is caused by the use of various statistical methods.

=== Religion ===
Census 2021 (1+ %)
Religion	Number	Fraction
Roman Catholic Church	19,326	60.97%
None	6074	19.16%
Greek Catholic Church	2585	8.16%
Not found out	2076	6.55%
Evangelical Church	994	3.14%
Total	31,698	

In year 2021 was 31,698 people by religion 19,326 from Roman Catholic Church, 6074 from None, 2585 from Greek Catholic Church, 2076 from Not found out, 994 from Evangelical Church, 258 from Eastern Orthodox Church, 101 from Christian Congregations in Slovakia, 39 from Ad hoc movements, 38 from Jehovah's Witnesses, 37 from Calvinist Church, 32 from Other, 32 from Apostolic Church, 21 from Other and not ascertained christian church, 21 from Buddhism, 16 from Paganism and natural spirituality, 12 from Islam, 8 from United Methodist Church, 7 from Old Catholic Church, 7 from Seventh-day Adventist Church, 6 from Baptists Church, 3 from Jewish community, 2 from Hinduism, 2 from Czechoslovak Hussite Church and 1 from Church of the Brethren.

== Municipalities ==
Municipality	Area [km^{2}]	Population
Gelnica	57.65	5,689
Helcmanovce	12.85	1,330
Henclová	14.31	107
Hrišovce	7.94	278
Jaklovce	17.25	1,806
Kluknava	33.95	1,527
Kojšov	31.80	676
Margecany	17.62	1,856
Mníšek nad Hnilcom	39.43	1,842
Nálepkovo	55.65	3,937
Prakovce	31.90	3,176
Richnava	6.96	3,634
Smolnícka Huta	37.32	470
Smolník	68.97	933
Stará Voda	3.28	184
Švedlár	84.49	2,109
Úhorná	8.82	148
Veľký Folkmár	23.10	868
Závadka	22.42	636
Žakarovce	8.61	678

Population and area values are current for year 2025.

== See also ==
- Bujanov Tunnel
- Harmanec Tunnel
