= Helcmanovce =

Helcmanovce Nagykuncfalva
- Municipality
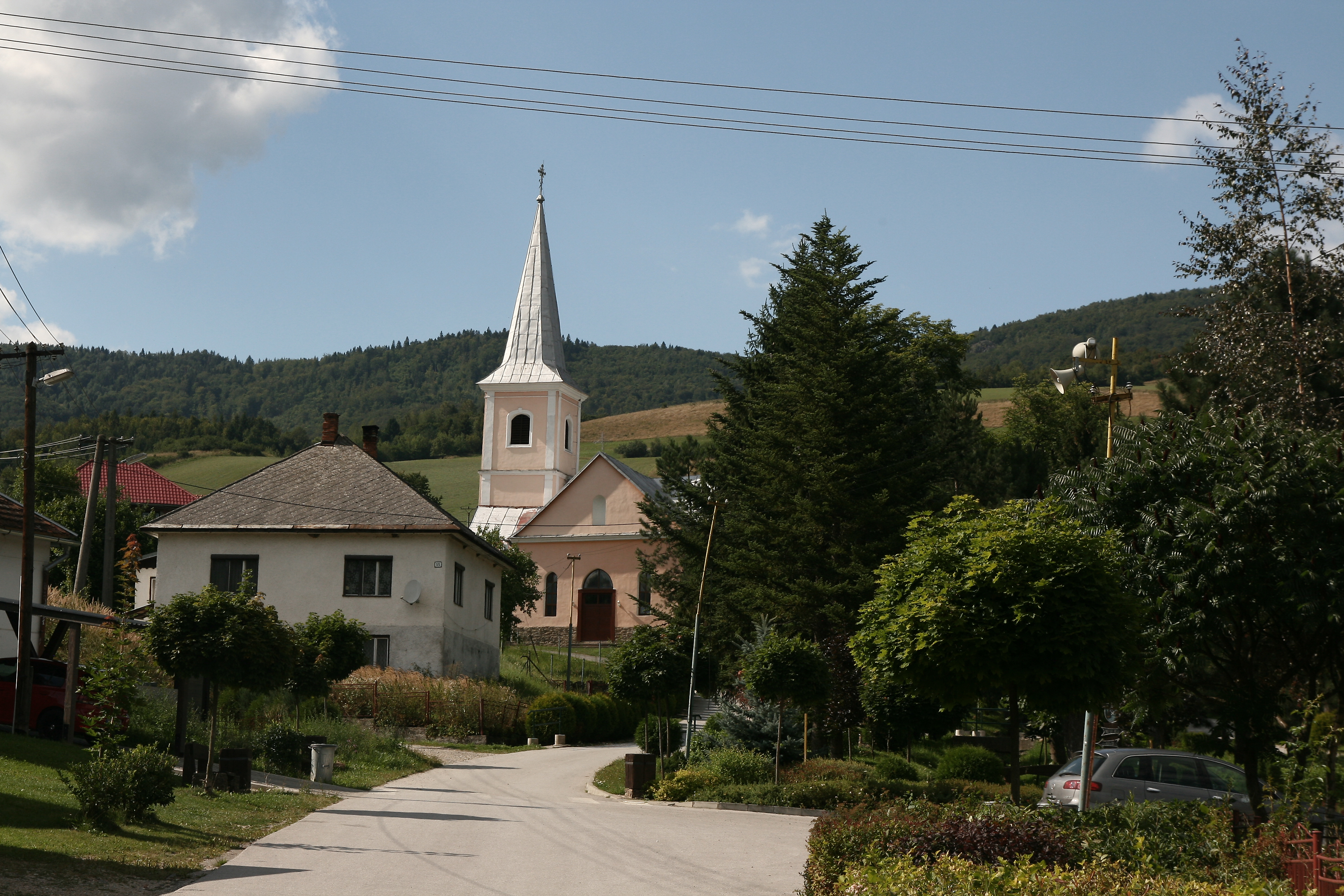
- Church of Saint Michael

- Flag

- Location of Helcmanovce in the Košice Region Location of Helcmanovce in Slovakia
- Coordinates: 48.83°N 20.87°E
- Country: Slovakia
- Region: Košice Region
- District: Gelnica District
- First mentioned: 1297

Area
  - Total: 12.85 km^{2} (4.96 sq mi)
- Elevation: 405 m (1,329 ft)

Population (2025)
  - Total: 1,330
- Time zone: UTC+1 (CET)
  - Summer (DST): UTC+2 (CEST)
- Postal code: 556 3
- Area code: +421 53
- Vehicle registration plate (until 2022): GL
- Website: helcmanovce.sk

Helcmanovce (Hungarian: Nagykuncfalva) is a village and municipality in the Gelnica District in the Košice Region of eastern Slovakia. In 2011, the municipality had 1,490 inhabitants.

== Geography ==
The municipality lies at an altitude of 405 metres (1,329 ft) and covers an area of 12.85 km^{2} (4.96 sq mi) (2025).

== Population ==
Population statistic (10 years)
Year	1995	2005	2015	2025
Count	1605	1543	1438	1330
Difference		−3.86%	−6.80%	−7.51%

Population statistic
Year	2024	2025
Count	1364	1330
Difference		−2.49%

It has a population of 1330 people (31 December 2025).

=== Ethnicity ===
Census 2021 (1+%)
Ethnicity	Number	Fraction
Slovak	1314	92.92%
Romani	143	10.11%
Rusyn	104	7.35%
Not found out	76	5.37%
Total	1414	

In year 2021 was 1414 people by ethnicity 1314 as Slovak, 143 as Romani, 104 as Rusyn, 76 as Not found out, 5 as Czech, 3 as Ukrainian, 2 as Other, 1 as Russian, 1 as Polish and 1 as Hungarian.

Note on population: The difference values of population numbers in the table "Population statistic" and in the sections "Ethnicity" & "Religion" is caused by the use of various statistical methods.

=== Religion ===
Census 2021 (1+%)
Religion	Number	Fraction
Greek Catholic Church	843	59.62%
Roman Catholic Church	260	18.39%
None	195	13.79%
Not found out	80	5.66%
Evangelical Church	17	1.2%
Total	1414	

In year 2021 was 1414 people by religion 843 from Greek Catholic Church, 260 from Roman Catholic Church, 195 from None, 80 from Not found out, 17 from Evangelical Church, 8 from Calvinist Church, 3 from Eastern Orthodox Church, 2 from Islam, 2 from Apostolic Church, 2 from Ad hoc movements, 1 from Other and not ascertained christian church and 1 from United Methodist Church.

== See also ==
- List of municipalities and towns in Slovakia
