= Prakovce =

Prakovce Prakfalva
- Municipality
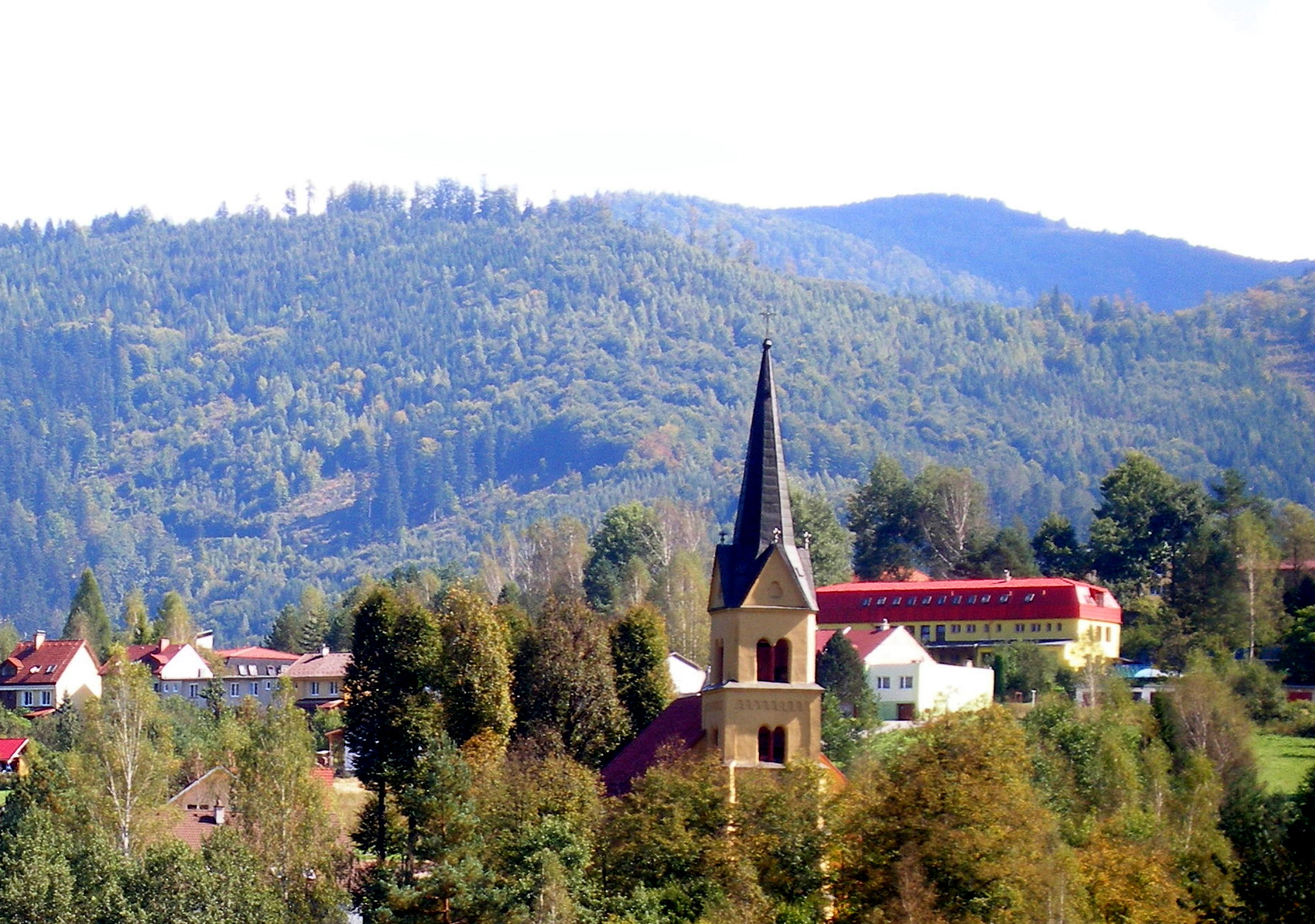

- Flag

- Location of Prakovce in the Košice Region Location of Prakovce in Slovakia
- Coordinates: 48.82°N 20.90°E
- Country: Slovakia
- Region: Košice Region
- District: Gelnica District
- First mentioned: 1368

Area
  - Total: 31.90 km^{2} (12.32 sq mi)
- Elevation: 390 m (1,280 ft)

Population (2025)
  - Total: 3,176
- Time zone: UTC+1 (CET)
  - Summer (DST): UTC+2 (CEST)
- Postal code: 556 2
- Area code: +421 53
- Vehicle registration plate (until 2022): GL
- Website: www.prakovce.sk

Prakovce (Hungarian: Prakfalva) is a village and municipality in the Gelnica District in the Košice Region of eastern Slovakia. Total municipality population was in 2011 3397 inhabitants

== Geography ==
The municipality lies at an altitude of 390 metres (1,280 ft) and covers an area of 31.90 km^{2} (12.32 sq mi) (2025).

== Population ==
Population statistic (10 years)
Year	1995	2005	2015	2025
Count	3433	3473	3347	3176
Difference		+1.16%	−3.62%	−5.10%

Population statistic
Year	2024	2025
Count	3184	3176
Difference		−0.25%

It has a population of 3176 people (31 December 2025).

=== Ethnicity ===
Census 2021 (1+ %)
Ethnicity	Number	Fraction
Slovak	3152	95.74%
Not found out	97	2.94%
Romani	52	1.57%
Total	3292	

In year 2021 was 3292 people by ethnicity 3152 as Slovak, 97 as Not found out, 52 as Romani, 24 as Czech, 18 as Rusyn, 12 as German, 9 as Hungarian, 8 as Ukrainian, 7 as Other, 2 as Russian, 1 as Polish and 1 as Croatian.

Note on population: The difference values of population numbers in the table "Population statistic" and in the sections "Ethnicity" & "Religion" is caused by the use of various statistical methods.

=== Religion ===
Census 2021 (1+ %)
Religion	Number	Fraction
Roman Catholic Church	1411	42.86%
None	1258	38.21%
Greek Catholic Church	315	9.57%
Not found out	183	5.56%
Evangelical Church	78	2.37%
Total	3292	

In year 2021 was 3292 people by religion 1411 from Roman Catholic Church, 1258 from None, 315 from Greek Catholic Church, 183 from Not found out, 78 from Evangelical Church, 11 from Eastern Orthodox Church, 8 from Christian Congregations in Slovakia, 6 from Other, 4 from Calvinist Church, 4 from Ad hoc movements, 3 from Paganism and natural spirituality, 3 from Other and not ascertained christian church, 3 from Apostolic Church, 2 from Old Catholic Church, 2 from Buddhism and 1 from Baptists Church.
