= R1 expressway (Slovakia) =

Expressway in Slovakia

Expressway R1
- Rýchlostná cesta R1
- Completed Under construction Planned

Route information
- Part of E58 E77 E571
- Length: 270.5 km (168.1 mi) Completed: 177.1 km (110.0 mi); Planned: 93.4 km (58.0 mi)

Major junctions
- From: I/51 Trnava, North
- D1 Trnava; R8 near Nitra (planned); R2 near Žiar nad Hronom; R3 Budča; R2 near Sliač (planned)
- To: D1 near Ružomberok (planned)

Location
- Country: Slovakia
- Regions: Trnava Region, Nitra Region, Banská Bystrica Region, Žilina Region
- Major cities: Trnava, Nitra, Žiar nad Hronom, Zvolen, Banská Bystrica, Ružomberok

Highway system
- Highways in Slovakia

R1 is an expressway (Slovak: rýchlostná cesta) in Slovakia, which begins near Trnava (planned to begin near Bratislava) and ends in Ružomberok. The R1 passes Sereď, Nitra, Zlaté Moravce, Hronský Beňadik, Nová Baňa, Žarnovica, Žiar nad Hronom, Zvolen and Banská Bystrica. The former partial designation of this route was D65.

Currently, continuous section between Trnava and bypass of Banská Bystrica is in operation. A linking section to Ružomberok and consequently back to motorway D1 has been planned since 2008. Both sections, Nitra - Hronský Beňadik and bypass of Banská Bystrica, were built, and are operated as a public-private partnership project.

== Chronology ==
Construction of the R1 expressway began in the 1970s. The 17.2 kilometres (10.7 mi) long Šášovské Podhradie - Budča was built in the 1980s. The section Sereď - Pata was built only in a half profile so in the mid-1990, the upgrade to a four-lane road began. The entire 13.1 kilometres (8.1 mi) long section from Trnava to Sereď was completely opened on 15 July 2000.

Žarnovica – Šášovské Podhradie; the section forming the Žarnovica bypass was built in two stages. The first one with the length of 9.675 kilometres (6.012 mi) was built between 2008 and 2010, and the second stage was built between 2008 and 2011, with its length totalling at 8.34 kilometres (5.18 mi).

=== Public private partnership project (PPP) ===
A 46 kilometres (29 mi) long section Nitra - Tekovské Nemce was financed by a PPP project. EUR 130 million was paid by the Slovak state to Granvia for the maintenance of the road in addition to the construction itself.

Granvia built three separate sections, which have been under construction since 2009 and were handed over for use on 28 October 2011. The first section; 12.59 kilometres (7.82 mi) long between Nitra–západ – Selenec, for which the planned cost from 2007 was EUR 196 million (5 billion CZK) with financing from the Structural Fund, the state budget and the resources of the National Motorway Company.

Completed at the same time was the 18.97 kilometres (11.79 mi) long section connecting Nitra and Beladice, and the 14.3 kilometres (8.9 mi) long section between Beladice – Tekovské Nemce which connects to the R1 at Zlaté Moravce.

=== Future development ===
A 3 kilometres (1.9 mi) long section in Banská Bystrica is under construction, and is planned to open in 2026. The remaining 48.3 kilometres (30.0 mi) between the R1 in Banská Bystrica and the D1 is not included in the construction plan until 2028.

== Sections of the expressway ==
| Section number | Section name | Section length in km | Year of commencement of works on the section | Year of section completion | Exits and junctions (x) with other motorways |
|---|---|---|---|---|---|
| 1. | Most pri Bratislave - Vlčkovce | 42,1 | 2028 | After the year 2040 | 1. D4xR1 junction; 2. Senec - juh (South); 3. Pusté Úľany; 4. Vlčkovce |
| 2. | Trnava - Sereď, Západ (Sereď, West) | 13,1 | 1997 | 2000 | 1. Trnava - východ (East); 2. Trnava - Modranka; 3. R1xD1 junction - Trnava; 4. Vlčkovce - sever (North); 5. Vlčkovce - juh (South); 6. Sereď - sever (North); 7. Sereď - západ (West) |
| 3. | Sereď, Západ (Sereď, West) - Dolná Streda | 2,4 | 1988, left half 1997, right half | 1990, left half 1998, right half | 1. Sereď - západ (West); 2. Galanta |
| 4. | Dolná Streda - Šoporňa | 4,5 | 1983, right half 1997, left half | 1989, right half 1998, left half | 1. Šintava |
| 5. | Šoporňa - Pata | 1,5 | 1993, right half 1997, left half | 1995, right half 1998, left half | 1. Pata |
| 6. | Pata - Báb | 6,9 | 1997 | 1998 | 1. Hájske; 2. Báb |
| 7. | Báb - Nitra, Západ (Nitra, West) | 9,9 | 1976 | 1980 | 1. R1xR1A junction - Nitra, Západ (West) |
| 8. | Nitra, Západ (Nitra, West) - Selenec | 14,3 | 2008 | 2011 | 1. Nitra - juh (South); 2. Nitra - východ (East) |
| 9. | Selenec - Beladice | 18,9 | 2008 | 2011 | Section without exits |
| 10. | Beladice - Tekovské Nemce | 14,3 | 2008 | 2011 | 1. Zlaté Moravce |
| 11. | Tekovské Nemce - Hronský Beňadik | 7,1 | 2004 | 2005 | 1. Čaradice; 2. Hronský Beňadik |
| 12. | Hronský Beňadik - Rudno nad Hronom | 3,6 | 2001 | 2003 | Section without exits |
| 13. | Nová Baňa bypass | 5,3 | 1997 | 2003 | 1. Nová Baňa |
| 14. | Nová Baňa - Rudno nad Hronom | 4,0 | 2001 | 2003 | Section without exits |
| 15. | Rudno nad Hronom - Žarnovica | 5,4 | 2004 | 2006 | Section without exits |
| 16. | Žarnovica bypass | 4,4 | 1996, left half 2004, right half | 1998, left half 2006, right half | 1. Žarnovica |
| 17. | Žarnovica - Šášovské Podhradie | 18,0 | 2008, I. subsection 2008, II. subsection | 2010, I. subsection 2011, II. subsection | 1. Bzenica; 2. Lehôtka pod Brehmi; 3. R1xR2 junction - Žiar nad Hronom, Juh (South) |
| 18. | Šášovské Podhradie - Budča | 17,2 | 1982 | 1986 | 1. Hronská Breznica; 2. Hronská Dúbrava; 3. Budča |
| 19. | Budča - Kováčová | 2,9 | 2001 | 2004 | 33. Zvolen - západ (West); 34. Zvolen - Stráže |
| 20. | Sliač (Kováčová) - Kremnička | 11,9 | 1972 | 1975 | 35. Kováčová; 36. Zvolen - Rákoš; 37. Sielnica; 38. Kremnička |
| 21. | Kremnička - Banská Bystrica, Juh (Banská Bystrica, South) | 1,9 | 1972 | 1975 | 39. Banská Bystrica - juh (South) (Only for R1 access) |
| 22. | Banská Bystrica, Juh (Banská Bystrica, South) - Banská Bystrica, Západ (Banská Bystrica, West) | 4,0 | 1975 | 1979 | 40. Banská Bystrica - Radvaň Park (R1 exit to Zvolen); 41. Banská Bystrica - Radvaň; 42. Banská Bystrica - centrum (Center); 43. Banská Bystrica - Podlavice; 44. Banská Bystrica - sever (North) |
| 23. | Banská Bystrica, northern bypass | 5,6 | 2009 | 2012 | 45. Banská Bystrica - Center 1 and 2; 46. Banská Bystrica - východ (East); 991. Temporary connection to the I/66 road |
| 24. | Banská Bystrica - Slovenská Ľupča | 8,1 | 11/2024 | 2026 | 47. Šalková; 48. Slovenská Ľupča |
| 26. | Slovenská Ľupča - Korytnica | 14,9 | 2028 | ? | 59. Korytnica |
| 27. | Korytnica - Liptovská Osada | 11,5 | 2028 | ? | 50. Liptovská Osada |
| 28. | Liptovská Osada - Ružomberok, Juh (Ružomberok, South) | 9,5 | 2028 | ? | Section without exits |
| 29. | Ružomberok, Juh (Ružomberok, South)- junction with the road I/18 | 4,7 | 2028 | ? | 51. Ružomberok - juh (South); 52. Ružomberok - východ (East) |
| 30. | junction with the road I/18 - R1xD1 junction | 2,6 | 2028 | ? | 53. Ivachnová, R1xD1 junction |

== See also ==
- Highways in Slovakia
- Controlled-access highway
- Transport in Slovakia
