= Pata, Galanta District =

Pata Vágpatta
- Municipality
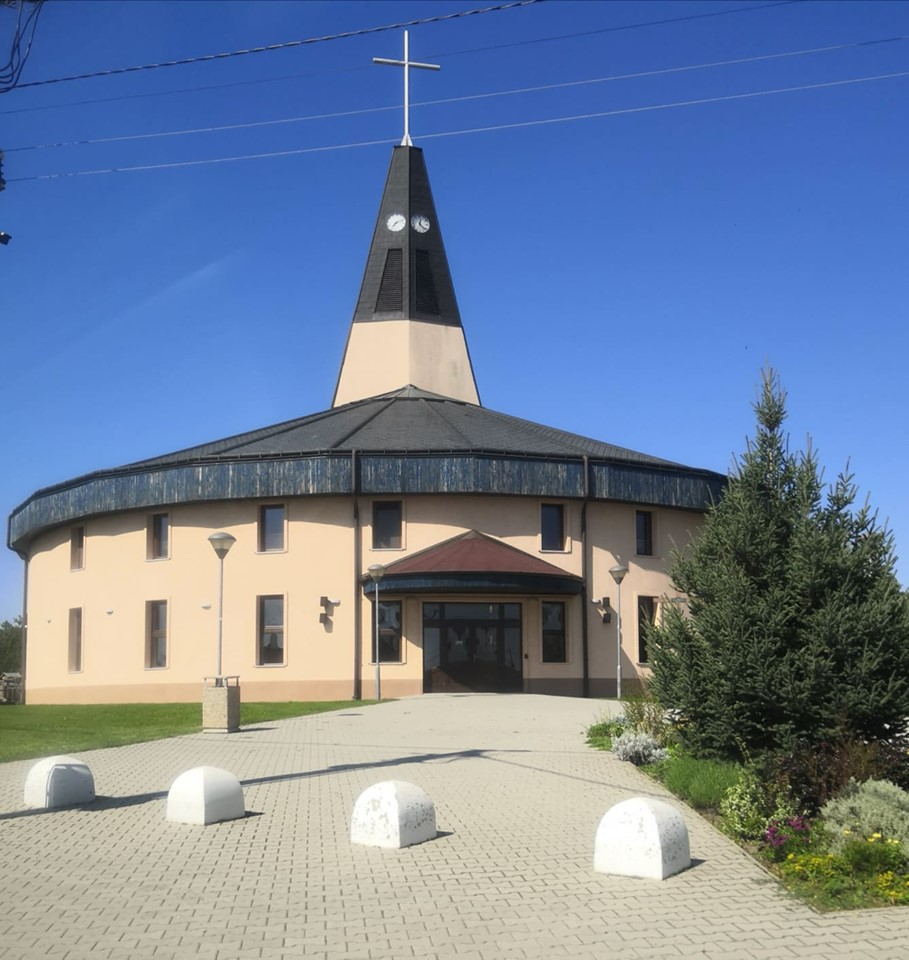
- Church of Nativity of Virgin Mary

- Flag

- Location of Pata in the Trnava Region Location of Pata in Slovakia
- Coordinates: 48°17′N 17°50′E
- Country: Slovakia
- Region: Trnava Region
- District: Galanta District
- First mentioned: 1156

Area
  - Total: 17.62 km^{2} (6.80 sq mi)
- Elevation: 138 m (453 ft)

Population (2025)
  - Total: 3,262
- Time zone: UTC+1 (CET)
  - Summer (DST): UTC+2 (CEST)
- Postal code: 925 53
- Area code: +421 31
- Vehicle registration plate (until 2022): GA
- Website: www.obecpata.sk

Pata (Hungarian: Vágpatta) is a village and municipality in Galanta District of the Trnava Region of south-west Slovakia. The village lies in central part of Danubian Lowland (in part called Danubian Upland) and in east–west part of Nitra Upland. The area consists of a mild upland and a shallow valley Jác. The Jarčie watercourse flows through the village. Nearby villages are Šoporňa, Báb, Pusté Sady, Šintava a Hájske. Pata lies 9 kilometres far from city of Sereď. Village is situated close to R1 expressway, which connect Trnava and Nitra.

== History ==
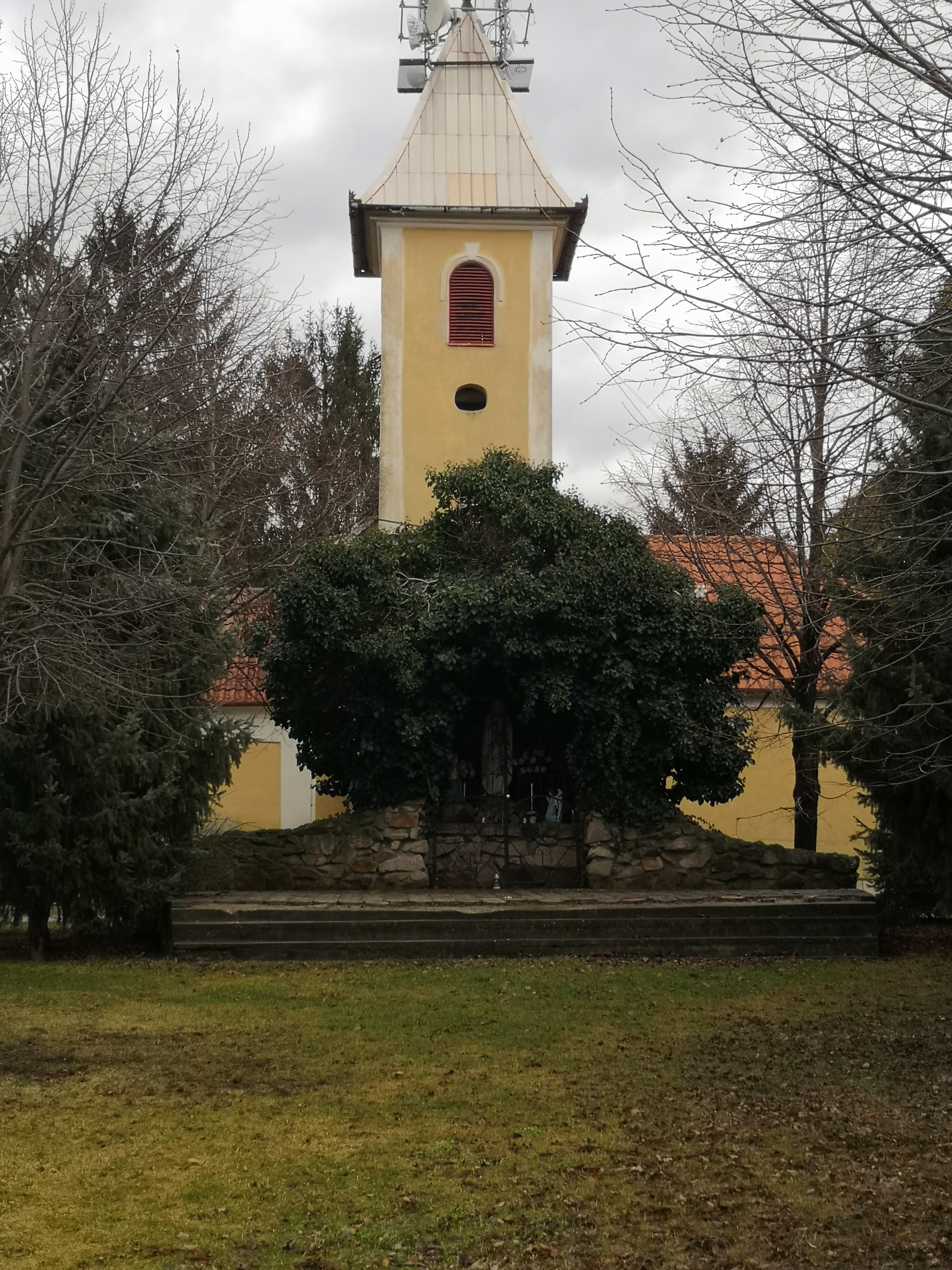
Old Church of Nativity of Virgin Mary, with Chapel of Mary in foreground

In historical records the village was first mentioned in 1156, but local settlement is known since prehistory age. In medieval times, Pata was prosperous village with church, Pata was settled by little nobles. After the Battle of Mohács in 1526, Pata became part of Šintava dominion. In 1820 the classicistic Church of Nativity of Virgin Mary was built. It is simple building built mostly by local citizens funds. Brincks were provided by landlord of Šintava. In revolution year 1849 a battle between Habsburg army and Hungarian army took place nearby Pata. Event is commemorated by obelisk called Oloment from Austria-Hungary era. Before the establishment of independent Czechoslovakia in 1918, it was part of Nyitra County within the Kingdom of Hungary. After 1918 the village become a part of Czechoslovakia. During World War II Pata was part of puppet Slovak state, after War again part of Czechoslovakia. Nowadays, Pata is middle sized village of Slovakia. In 21st century new, modern Church of Nativity of Virgin Mary was built.

== Population ==
Population statistic (10 years)
Year	1995	2005	2015	2025
Count	2901	3045	3107	3262
Difference		+4.96%	+2.03%	+4.98%

Population statistic
Year	2024	2025
Count	3274	3262
Difference		−0.36%

It has a population of 3262 people (31 December 2025).

=== Ethnicity ===
Census 2021 (1+ %)
Ethnicity	Number	Fraction
Slovak	3139	96.49%
Not found out	83	2.55%
Total	3253	

In year 2021 was 3253 people by ethnicity 3139 as Slovak, 83 as Not found out, 19 as Czech, 18 as Romanian, 13 as Hungarian, 8 as Other, 6 as Russian, 5 as Romani, 3 as Rusyn, 3 as Moravian, 2 as Polish, 2 as German, 1 as Jewish, 1 as Irish, 1 as Ukrainian and 1 as Austrian.

Note on population: The difference values of population numbers in the table "Population statistic" and in the sections "Ethnicity" & "Religion" is caused by the use of various statistical methods.

=== Religion ===
Census 2021 (1+ %)
Religion	Number	Fraction
Roman Catholic Church	2483	76.33%
None	529	16.26%
Not found out	131	4.03%
Total	3253	

In year 2021 was 3253 people by religion 2483 from Roman Catholic Church, 529 from None, 131 from Not found out, 32 from Greek Catholic Church, 26 from Christian Congregations in Slovakia, 19 from Evangelical Church, 12 from Other, 7 from Ad hoc movements, 3 from Old Catholic Church, 3 from Other and not ascertained christian church, 2 from Jehovah's Witnesses, 2 from United Methodist Church, 1 from Calvinist Church, 1 from Eastern Orthodox Church, 1 from Paganism and natural spirituality and 1 from Church of Jesus Christ of Latter-day Saints.
