= Tatranky =

Wafer

Tatranky are the Czechoslovak five-layer (originally six-layer) wafers with chocolate coating only on narrower edges. They were introduced in 1945.

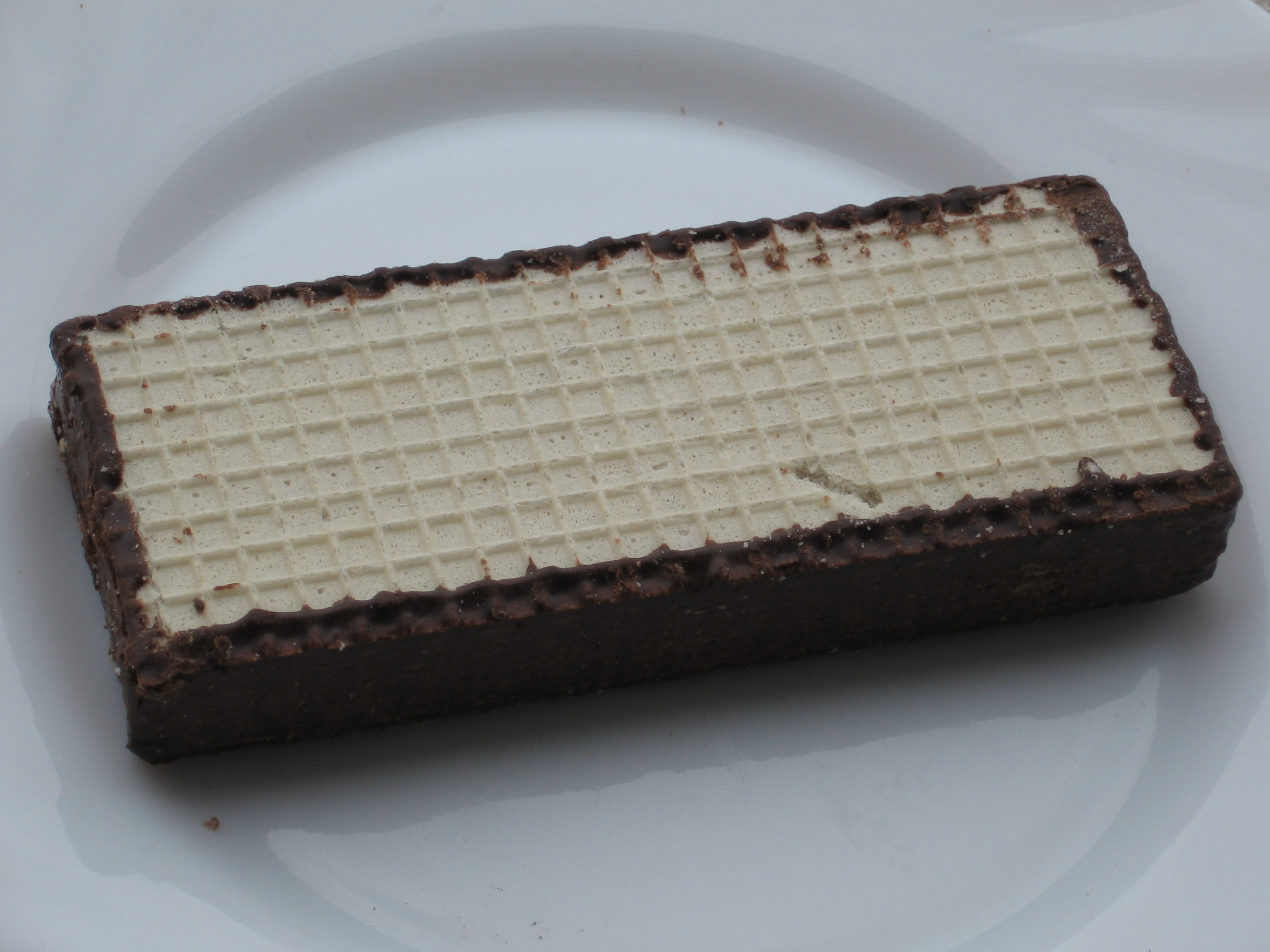
Tatranky

Originally they were supposed to have a triangular shape like the peaks of the mountains, from which the name was also derived, but due to the technical difficulties of making the circuit topping in serial production and packing in cellophane, it was finally decided to have a rectangular shape. The filling originally had the taste of hazelnuts, later chocolate and peanut. After 1989, further variations appeared, but also the number of layers was reduced to five.

In 1960 a version called Stadionka was created, which had a chocolate coating over the entire surface, but due to the greater demand for chocolate, this version was abandoned and started to be produced again after 1989 under the name čokotatranky. Tatranky were first produced by the state-owned company Čokoládovny, which was founded in 1947 by the nationalization of Theodor Fiedor and the merger of other companies.

Currently it is produced in Slovakia by Sedita company in Sereď and in the Czech Republic by Opavia.

Similar five-layer wafers are produced under the brand name "Horalky".

== See also ==
- Mondelēz International
