= Beladice =

Beladice Bélád
- Municipality
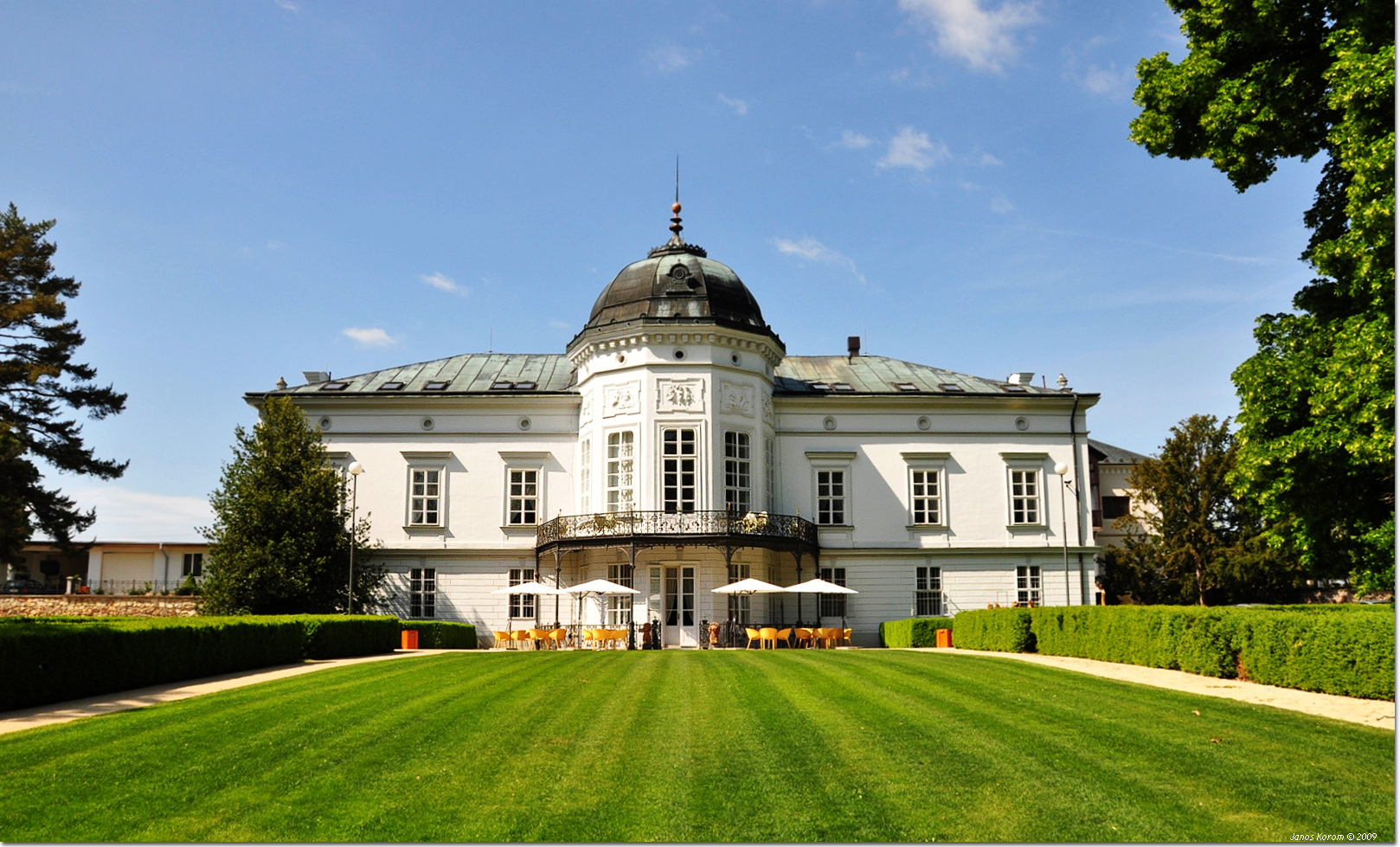

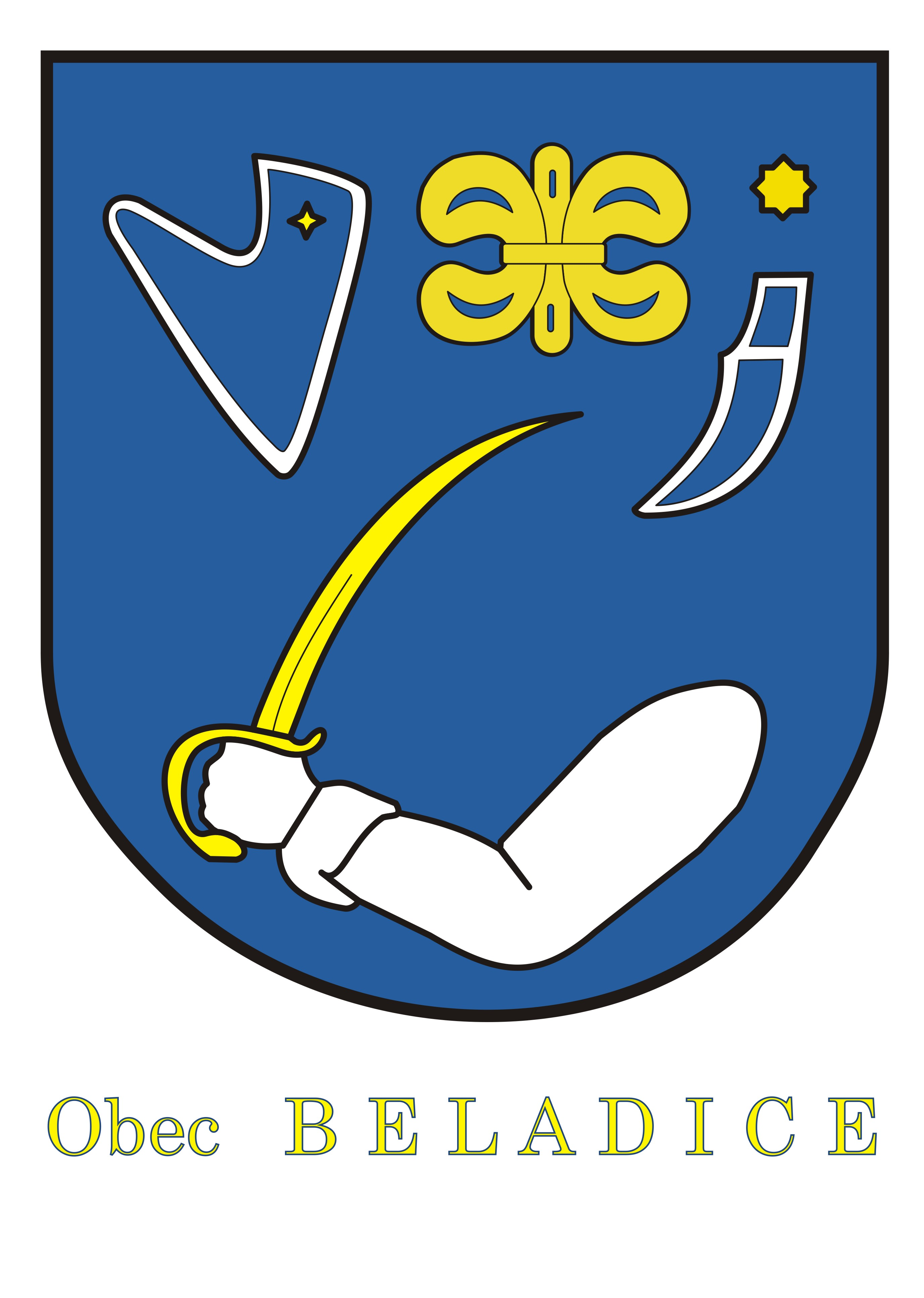
- Flag Coat of arms

- Location of Beladice in the Nitra Region Location of Beladice in Slovakia
- Coordinates: 48.35°N 18.30°E
- Country: Slovakia
- Region: Nitra Region
- District: Zlaté Moravce District
- First mentioned: 1156

Area
  - Total: 22.40 km^{2} (8.65 sq mi)
- Elevation: 170 m (560 ft)

Population (2025)
  - Total: 1,784
- Time zone: UTC+1 (CET)
  - Summer (DST): UTC+2 (CEST)
- Postal code: 951 75
- Area code: +421 37
- Vehicle registration plate (until 2022): ZM
- Website: www.obecbeladice.sk

Beladice (Hungarian: Bélád) is a village and municipality in Zlaté Moravce District of the Nitra Region, in western-central Slovakia. It is located in the lowhilled area and in the near of R1 expressway.

== History ==
In historical records the village was first mentioned in 1156.

== Geography ==
The municipality lies at an altitude of 170 metres (560 ft) and covers an area of 22.40 km^{2} (8.65 sq mi) (2025).

== Population ==
Population statistic (10 years)
Year	1995	2005	2015	2025
Count	1533	1520	1610	1784
Difference		−0.84%	+5.92%	+10.80%

Population statistic
Year	2024	2025
Count	1768	1784
Difference		+0.90%

It has a population of 1784 people (31 December 2025).

=== Ethnicity ===
Census 2021 (1+ %)
Ethnicity	Number	Fraction
Slovak	1526	91.59%
Not found out	106	6.36%
Romani	25	1.5%
Total	1666	

In year 2021 was 1666 people by ethnicity 1526 as Slovak, 106 as Not found out, 25 as Romani, 14 as Hungarian, 8 as Czech, 5 as Other, 4 as Rusyn, 3 as Russian, 2 as German, 2 as Moravian, 1 as Ukrainian and 1 as Greek.

Note on population: The difference values of population numbers in the table "Population statistic" and in the sections "Ethnicity" & "Religion" is caused by the use of various statistical methods.

=== Religion ===
Census 2021 (1+ %)
Religion	Number	Fraction
Roman Catholic Church	1190	71.43%
None	325	19.51%
Not found out	101	6.06%
Total	1666	

In year 2021 was 1666 people by religion 1190 from Roman Catholic Church, 325 from None, 101 from Not found out, 15 from Evangelical Church, 7 from Other and not ascertained christian church, 5 from Eastern Orthodox Church, 5 from Greek Catholic Church, 4 from Ad hoc movements, 3 from Calvinist Church, 3 from Jehovah's Witnesses, 2 from Christian Congregations in Slovakia, 2 from Other, 2 from Czechoslovak Hussite Church, 1 from Paganism and natural spirituality and 1 from Apostolic Church.

== Facilities ==
The village has a small public library a gym and football pitch.

== Genealogical resources ==
The records for genealogical research are available at the state archive "Statny Archiv in Nitra, Slovakia"

- Roman Catholic church records (births/marriages/deaths): 1697–1896 (parish B)
- Lutheran church records (births/marriages/deaths): 1827–1894 (parish B)
- Reformated church records (births/marriages/deaths): 1827–1895 (parish B)

== See also ==
- List of municipalities and towns in Slovakia
