= Sedita =

Slovak brand based in Sered'

- Logo used since 2024
- Company type: Private
- Industry: Sweetened pastries
- Founded: 1954; 72 years ago
- Headquarters: Sereď, Slovakia
- Owner: I.D.C. Holding
- Website: sedita.sk

Sedita is a Slovak brand name under which food products are sold by the Pečivárne Sereď factory located in the town of Sereď in the Trnava Region. The factory produces sweetened long-life pastries, such as sponge cakes, gingerbread cookies, and Horalky, the latter of which Sedita is most known for producing. The company currently exports its products to 30 countries around the world.

== History ==
=== Founding and early success ===
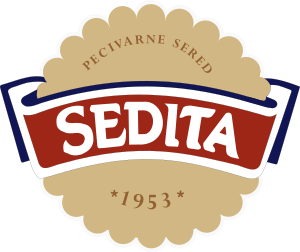
Logo used between 2000–2024

Slovak Bakery in Sereď, n.p. was established in 1953 by merging several smaller local bakeries and craft workshops (e.g. WECO in Kremnica, Hana in Ružomberok, Maškrta in Piešťany, Tatranka in Liptovský Hrádek, etc.). In order to satisfy the demand for long-lasting baked goods and to concentrate production at the expense of inefficient operations in Kremnica, Ružomberok, and Piešťany, construction of a new factory in Sered' began in 1962. After its full operation in 1966, production was concentrated in only three locations. Wafers were produced in two Sereď factories (old and new), the factory in Liptovský Hrádok specialized in the production of biscuits, and the factory in Holíč was dedicated to the production of tubes and gingerbread. From 1963 to 1968, the production base was part of the branch enterprise Průmysl trvanlího pečiva in Prague. Annual production during this period was at the level of 17,000 tons in approximately 70 types of durable bread. At the beginning of 1969, the enterprise became independent as Pečivárne Sereď with headquarters in Bratislava, which was to enable better management of the enterprise and faster introduction of new technologies, and thus also the growth of production. The largest part of the production was directed to the Czechoslovak market, some was exported to neighboring socialist states (primarily the GDR and Hungary), in the 1980s more than 100 tons were delivered monthly to non-socialist states (especially Saudi Arabia and Kuwait).

=== Recent years ===
In 1992, Pečivárne Sereď was acquired by Štefan Kassay and Pavol Jakubec as part of privatization and, together with the Figaro Trnava plant (privatization 1993), they incorporated it into the assets of I.D.C. Holding, a.s., which became one of the most important producer of confectionery and long-life pastries in Slovakia. In 2000, the logo was redesigned with the gradual replacement of the Pečivárne Sereď brand with its current name, Sedita. In its recent years, Sedita produces around 600 tons of bakery products per week, of which more than 50% is exported to other countries.

== Products ==
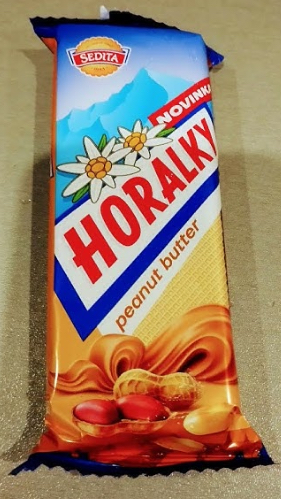
A Horalka

The Sedita brand covers about 40 types of products in 5 product categories: wafers, biscuits, gingerbread, sponges, dia. The most known products in chronological development of the market launch:

- 1965– Horalky – wafers with peanut filling and perimeter dipped in chocolate
- 1960 – Romanca – two oval biscuits glued together with cocoa filling
- 1961 – Coffees – two wafer slices filled with coffee filling
- 1963 – Cocoa slices – undipped wafers with cocoa cream filling
- 1968 Princesses – sandwich biscuits with coffee and cream filling
- 1969 – Mila – semi-dipped wafer with milk cream filling
- 1984 – Venečky – undipped biscuits, due to technical problems with the shape proper production only from 1987 (at the factory in Liptovský Hrádek)
- 1988 – Lina – fully dipped wafers with cream filling
- 2015 – brand Rodinné
