= Devil's Rock, Budča =

Stone structure in Budča, Slovakia

Coordinates: 48°34′00″N 19°01′20″E

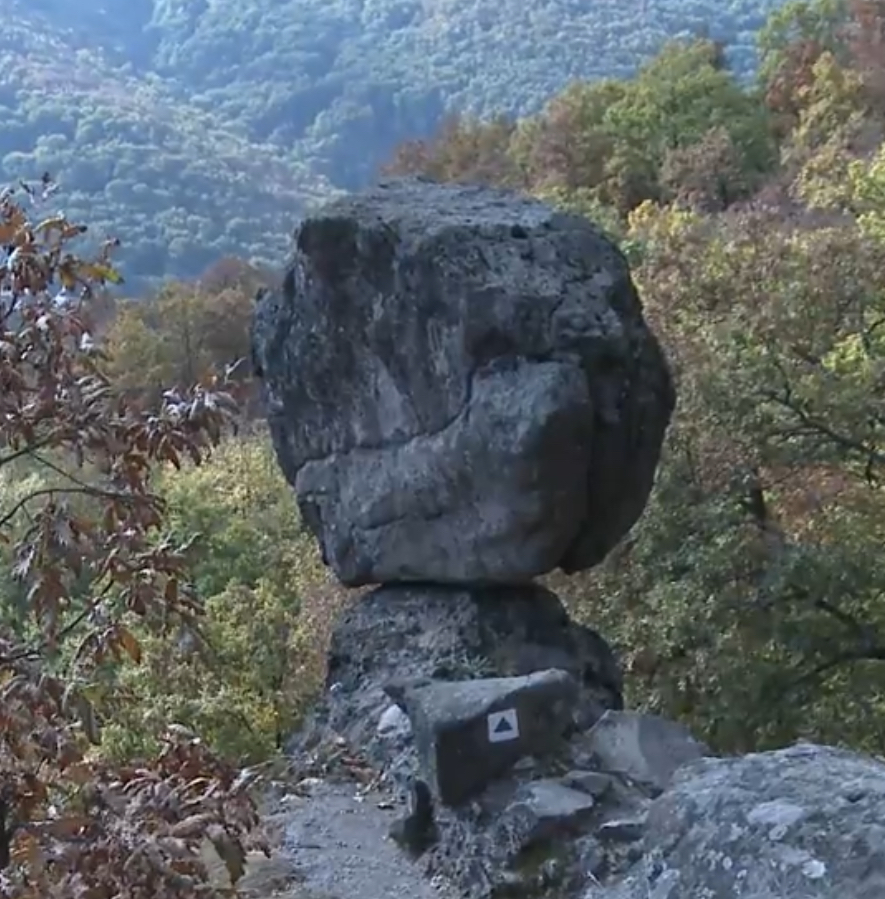
The rock in 2025

Devil's Rock (Slovak: Čertova skala; also known as the Mushroom rock) is a naturally formed stone structure that stands on the edge of a mountain in the Boky national nature reserve near Budča in Slovakia. It is unique in Central Europe.

Čertova skala was formed through the weathering of a volcanic bomb made of andesite. The boulder is linked to local legends, leading to its being named after the devil.

== Description ==
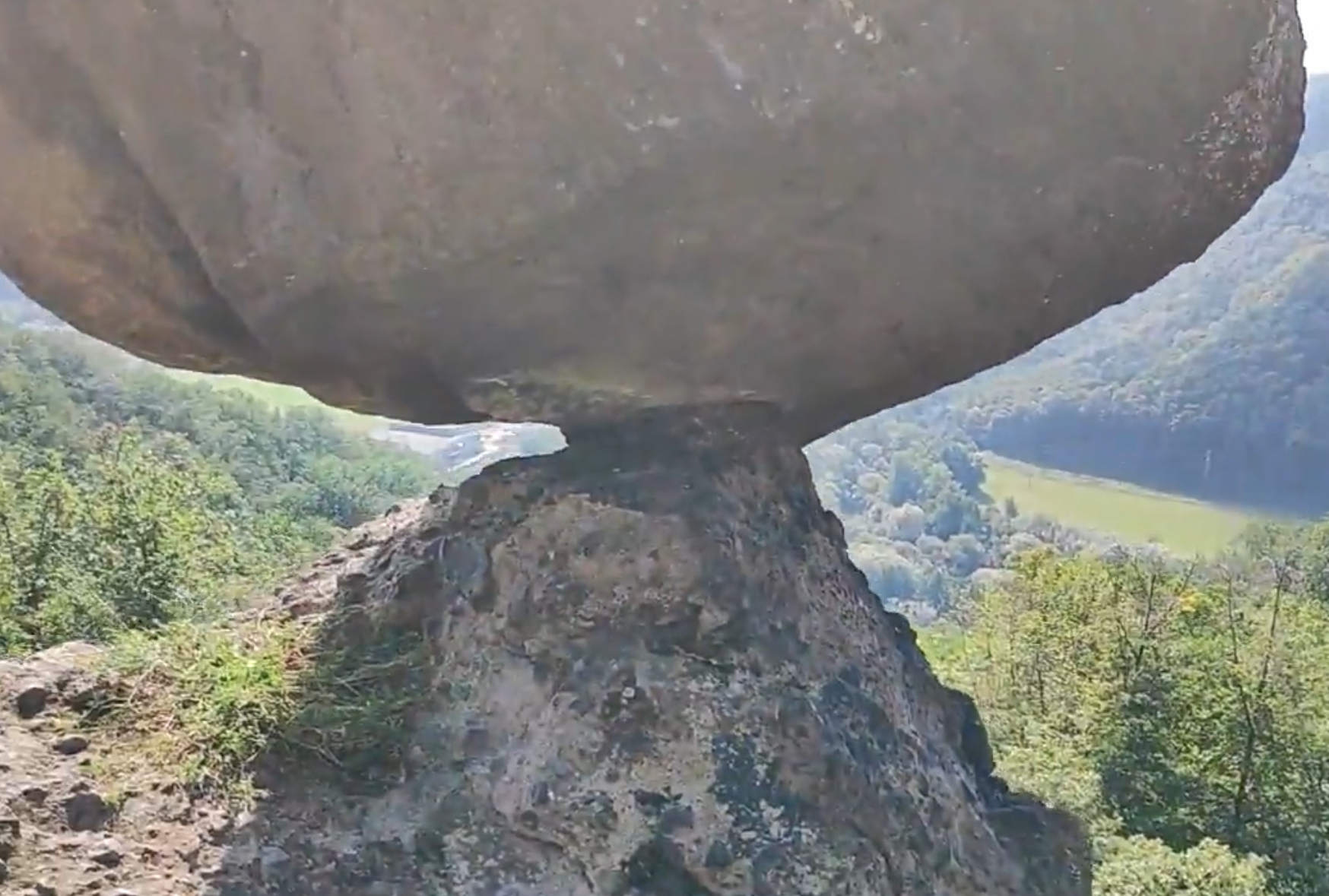
The boulder connected to its 2 cm thick base

The boulder is balanced on a small patch of bedrock on the edge of a mountain. It weighs approximately 17 tonnes and has a volume of around 5 cubic metres. It lies on a small uplifted area of stone with dimensions of 58x38 cm. The upper part of the boulder is made of andesite, under which is tuffite, which weathered much faster, resulting in its current shape. It was formed from a flattened volcanic bomb, which protects a less resistant pillar composed of tuff and agglomerates. The boulder is connected to the base by a thin layer of volcanic tuff which is approximately 2 cm thick.

Despite some visitors attempting to damage it, research shows that the Devil's Rock is secure and likely to last for hundreds or thousands of years, barring seismic activity. The rock's unique shape resulted from weathering differences between the layers, and it is protected within the Boky national nature reserve.

== Name ==
The Devil's Rock is linked to local legends, including one that says the devil once tried to cast a spell on the inhabitants of Budča, but the stone fell on a nearby hill instead, preventing any harm. Another legend says that the boulder was built by the devil himself, who wanted to throw it down and punish the inhabitants of Budča. It was later named after the devil.

== See also ==
- List of individual rocks
