= Horalky =

Slovak wafer biscuit sold in Central Europe

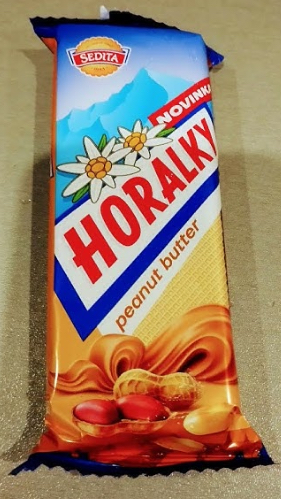
A Horalka

Horalky is a Slovak wafer biscuit with peanut filling and cocoa coating made by I.D.C. Holding, a.s. under the Sedita brand. Originally introduced in 1959, its recipe was set in 1965. Horalky was introduced in Poland in 2007 (in 2012 the name was changed to a more Polish version, Góralki), and in Hungary in late 2008 (in 2016 the name was changed to Moments).

The word horalky is a diminutive for the horec (gentian) flower depicted on the wrapper of the wafer, along with the Plesnivec (edelweiss) flower.

Similar five-layer wafers are produced under the brand name "Tatranky".
