= Budča =

Budča Zólyombúcs
- Municipality
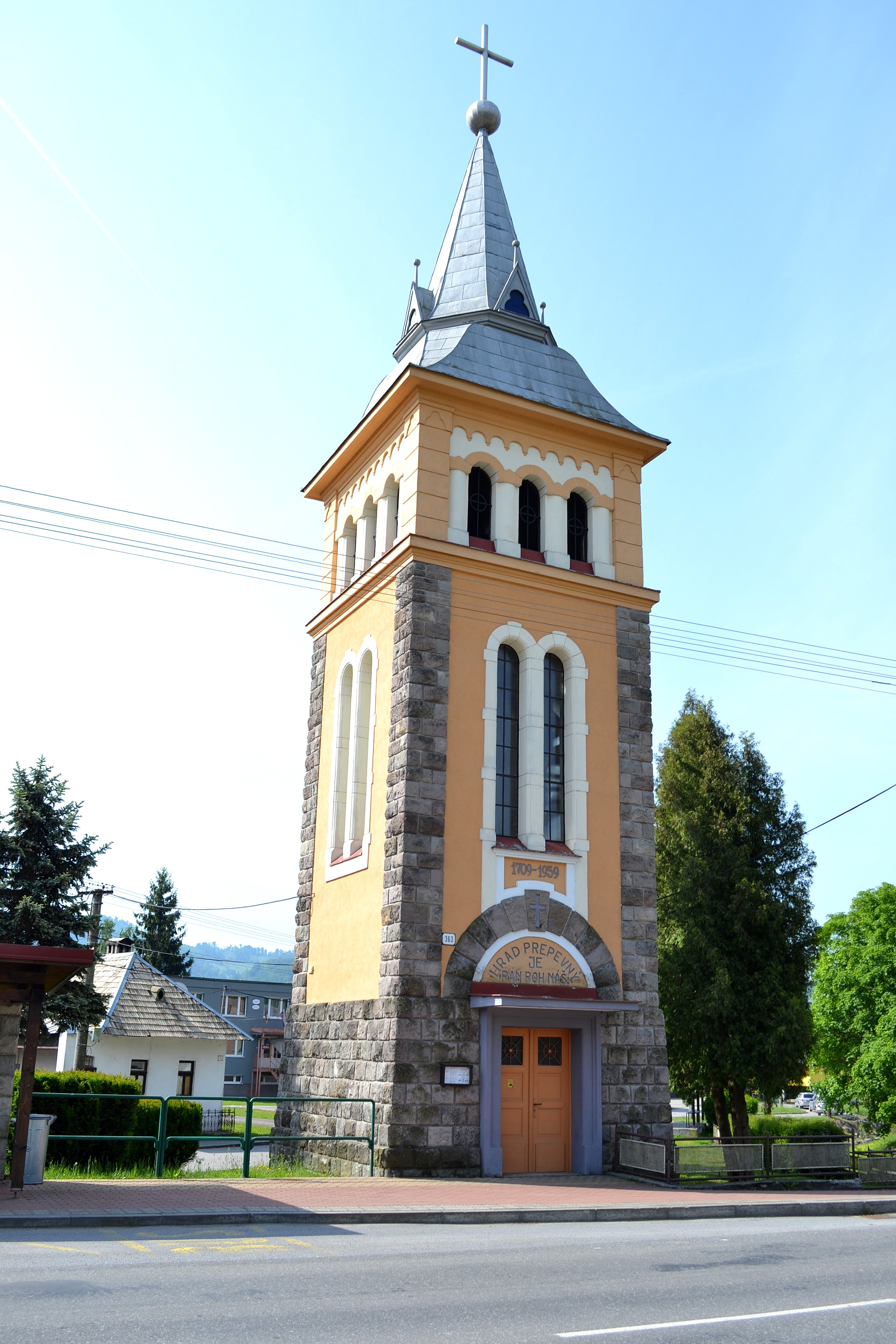

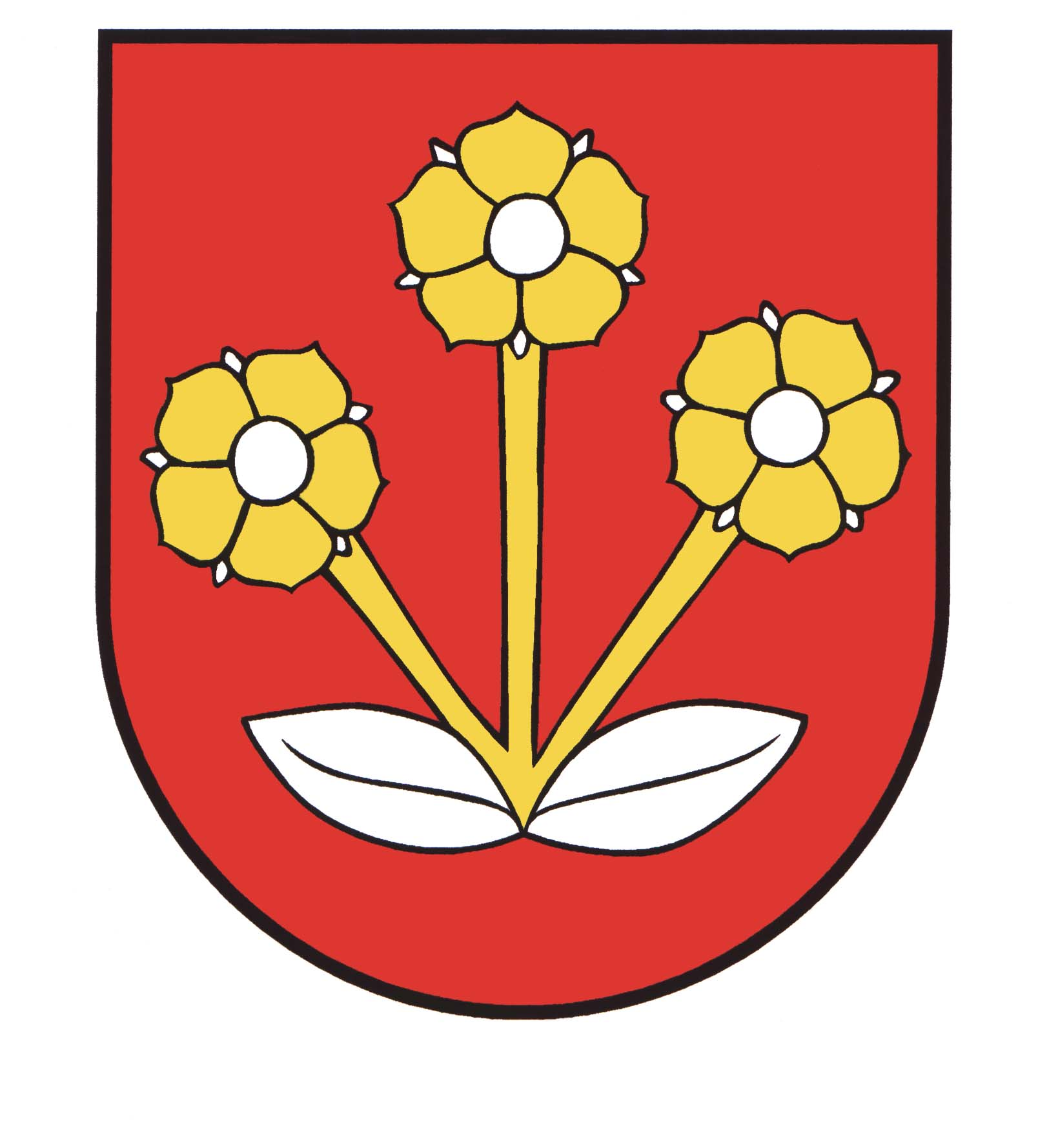
- Flag Coat of arms

- Location of Budča in the Banská Bystrica Region Location of Budča in Slovakia
- Coordinates: 48.58°N 19.07°E
- Country: Slovakia
- Region: Banská Bystrica Region
- District: Zvolen District
- First mentioned: 1254

Government
  - Mayor: František Moravec

Area
  - Total: 15.90 km^{2} (6.14 sq mi)
- Elevation: 285 m (935 ft)

Population (2025)
  - Total: 1,372
- Time zone: UTC+1 (CET)
  - Summer (DST): UTC+2 (CEST)
- Postal code: 962 33
- Area code: +421 45
- Vehicle registration plate (until 2022): ZV
- Website: www.budca.sk

Budča (Hungarian: Zólyombúcs) is a village and municipality of the Zvolen District in the Banská Bystrica Region of Slovakia.

== Geography ==
The municipality lies at an altitude of 285 metres (935 ft) and covers an area of 15.90 km^{2} (6.14 sq mi) (2025).

Budča is situated approximately 5 km west of the town of Zvolen in a valley between the Štiavnica Mountains and Kremnica Mountains, near the Hron river at an altitude of 285 meters. Historically, it lies on the Kraków highway, linking central Slovakia with the south and north. The village is surrounded on all sides by mountains.

== Population ==
Population statistic (10 years)
Year	1995	2005	2015	2025
Count	1005	1175	1316	1372
Difference		+16.91%	+12%	+4.25%

Population statistic
Year	2024	2025
Count	1370	1372
Difference		+0.14%

It has a population of 1372 people (31 December 2025).

=== Ethnicity ===
Census 2021 (1+ %)
Ethnicity	Number	Fraction
Slovak	1310	97.76%
Not found out	19	1.41%
Czech	16	1.19%
Romani	15	1.11%
Total	1340	

In year 2021 was 1340 people by ethnicity 1310 as Slovak, 19 as Not found out, 16 as Czech, 15 as Romani, 10 as Hungarian, 4 as Other, 3 as Moravian, 2 as Russian, 2 as German, 2 as English, 1 as Italian, 1 as Polish, 1 as Canadian and 1 as Croatian.

Note on population: The difference values of population numbers in the table "Population statistic" and in the sections "Ethnicity" & "Religion" is caused by the use of various statistical methods.

=== Religion ===
Census 2021 (1+ %)
Religion	Number	Fraction
Roman Catholic Church	682	50.9%
None	424	31.64%
Evangelical Church	159	11.87%
Not found out	27	2.01%
Greek Catholic Church	15	1.12%
Total	1340	

In year 2021 was 1340 people by religion 682 from Roman Catholic Church, 424 from None, 159 from Evangelical Church, 27 from Not found out, 15 from Greek Catholic Church, 8 from Apostolic Church, 8 from Ad hoc movements, 4 from Christian Congregations in Slovakia, 4 from Other, 3 from United Methodist Church, 2 from Eastern Orthodox Church, 2 from Other and not ascertained christian church and 2 from Buddhism.

== Language, people, customs ==
The dialect of Budča is central Slovakian, with deviations from the standard language. Many elements in Hont County's dialect are a result of the joint estate of Budča and Dobrá Niva by the Esterházi family.

Some traditional customs are observed, usually around Christmas and Easter. Also, before and during weddings some traditions are kept.

== Architecture, attractions, tourism ==
Older historical buildings, due to numerous wars, disasters, and invasion, no longer exist. In the 1990s significant new home construction began, and continued into the early 21st century. Proximity to Zvolen made the village a popular location for building houses.

The slopes of the nearby mountains are a Protected Landscape Area and harbor native plants and thermophiles, the northernmost point of their occurrence.

Another natural attraction is Devil's Rock, located about 3 km west of the village on a steep slope above the main road to Žiar nad Hronom; it resulted from volcanic origin of the surrounding mountains. There is a local legend about its origin: The Devil helped local fishermen with catches in return for a promise that they would never go to church. The men failed their promise, so the Devil began to accumulate rock dam in the confines Hron. Luckily, the Devil did not quite succeed, leaving only the stone seas and Devil's Rock itself.

== Economy and employment ==
Initially the government planned to build a complex for paper fabric production in the village, but in the end a large-scale pig farm was built, the largest in Slovakia. There are not many other employment opportunities in Budča; however, there are plans to build an industrial park.

== Transport ==
The village is easily accessible by local road and rail networks.

== History ==
The village was first mentioned in the first half of the 13th century, when its original name was Bucha. Later, under Hungarian influences, the name changed to Bucs, then to Zólyóm Bucs. After 1918 it was Buča, and since 1928 it has been Budča.

The first church was built in 1239 in the Gothic style. In the 16th and 17th centuries it was among the largest settlements in the region.

Throughout its history Budča has been plagued by wars and rebellions: the Turks; the Bethlen, Tököly and Rakoczy insurrections; both World Wars of the 20th century; and the soldiers of the Hungarian Republic of Councils. The village has experienced other disasters, of which the worst in recent times was a fire in 1900.

Before the establishment of independent Czechoslovakia in 1918, Budča was part of Zólyom County within the Kingdom of Hungary. From 1939 to 1945, it was part of the Slovak Republic.

Uprisings forced the people to withdraw into the mountains, where they founded the settlement called Old Budča. After the threats passed, the population returned to their original village and Old Budča disappeared, but its traces can still be seen. Inhabitants of the village were also actively involved in the Slovak National Uprising (abbreviated SNP).

Systems of education started early in Budča's history; from about 1239, religious education was reputedly taking place at the local pastorate. Journalist, educator, and raconteur Ľudo Zelienka taught there from 1940 to 1944. A new school was opened on 1 September 1964; the school was built primarily by the people of Budča themselves.

== Region ==
Budča is home of the civic association named micro region Adela.

== Places of interest ==
- Devil's Rock, Budča
