= Tekovské Nemce =

Tekovské Nemce Garamnémeti
- Municipality
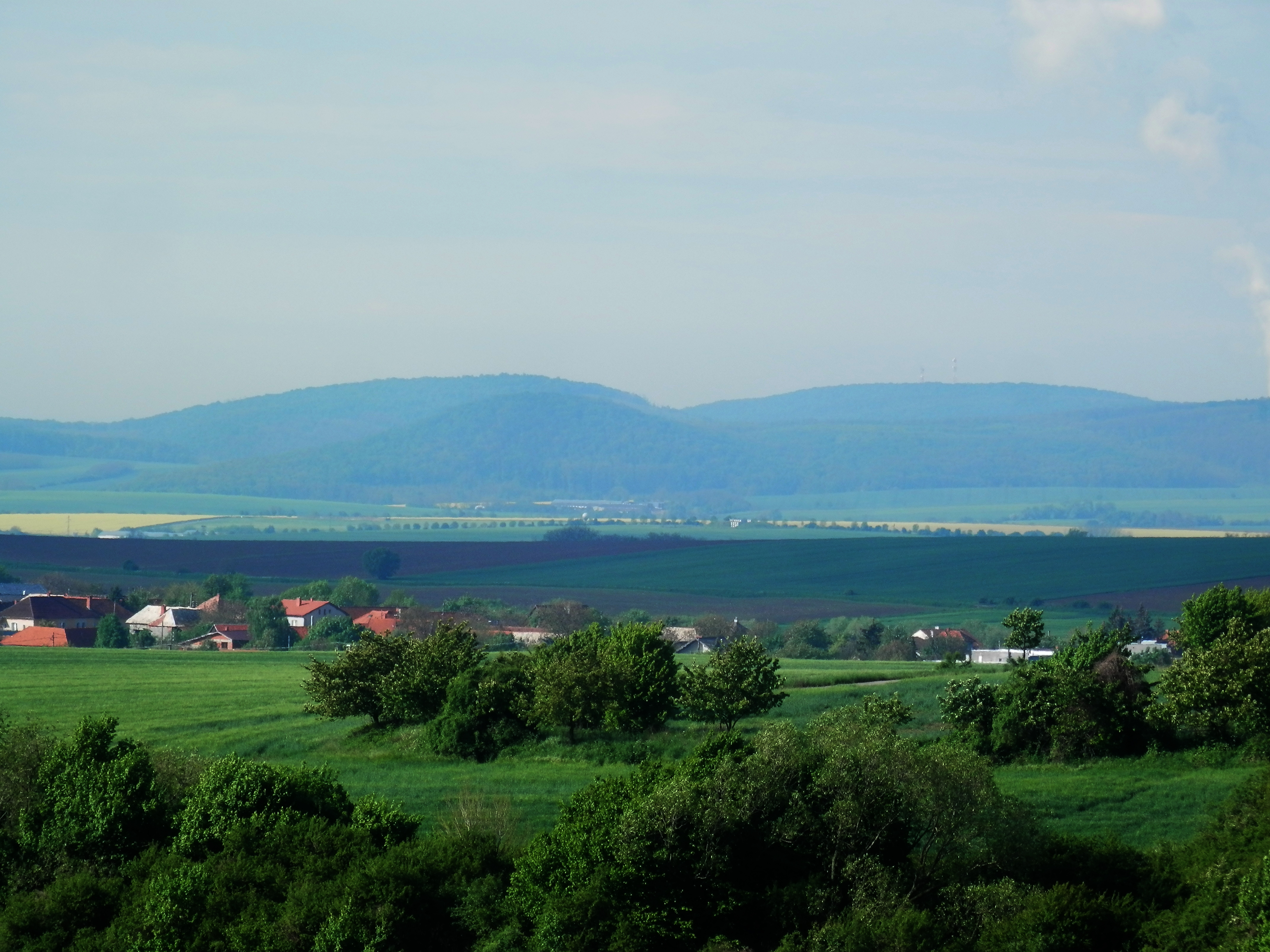
- Tekovské Nemce from Expressway R1

- Flag

- Location of Tekovské Nemce in the Nitra Region Location of Tekovské Nemce in Slovakia
- Coordinates: 48.36°N 18.53°E
- Country: Slovakia
- Region: Nitra Region
- District: Zlaté Moravce District
- First mentioned: 1275

Area
  - Total: 28.50 km^{2} (11.00 sq mi)
- Elevation: 242 m (794 ft)

Population (2025)
  - Total: 1,011
- Time zone: UTC+1 (CET)
  - Summer (DST): UTC+2 (CEST)
- Postal code: 966 54
- Area code: +421 45
- Vehicle registration plate (until 2022): ZM
- Website: www.tekovske-nemce.sk

Tekovské Nemce (Hungarian: Garamnémeti) is a village and municipality in Zlaté Moravce District of the Nitra Region, in western-central Slovakia.

== History ==
In historical records the village was first mentioned in 1275.

== Geography ==
The municipality lies at an altitude of 242 metres (794 ft) and covers an area of 28.50 km^{2} (11.00 sq mi) (2025).

== Population ==
Population statistic (10 years)
Year	1995	2005	2015	2025
Count	1081	1071	1079	1011
Difference		−0.92%	+0.74%	−6.30%

Population statistic
Year	2024	2025
Count	1029	1011
Difference		−1.74%

It has a population of 1011 people (31 December 2025).

=== Ethnicity ===
Census 2021 (1+ %)
Ethnicity	Number	Fraction
Slovak	1007	94.91%
Not found out	48	4.52%
Total	1061	

In year 2021 was 1061 people by ethnicity 1007 as Slovak, 48 as Not found out, 8 as Other, 5 as English, 4 as Czech, 2 as Romani, 2 as Hungarian, 1 as Vietnamese, 1 as Rusyn, 1 as French and 1 as Bulgarian.

Note on population: The difference values of population numbers in the table "Population statistic" and in the sections "Ethnicity" & "Religion" is caused by the use of various statistical methods.

=== Religion ===
Census 2021 (1+ %)
Religion	Number	Fraction
Roman Catholic Church	808	76.15%
None	151	14.23%
Not found out	61	5.75%
Evangelical Church	11	1.04%
Total	1061	

In year 2021 was 1061 people by religion 808 from Roman Catholic Church, 151 from None, 61 from Not found out, 11 from Evangelical Church, 10 from Greek Catholic Church, 7 from Ad hoc movements, 6 from Other, 4 from Seventh-day Adventist Church, 2 from Other and not ascertained christian church and 1 from Apostolic Church.
