= Báb, Nitra District =

Báb
- Municipality
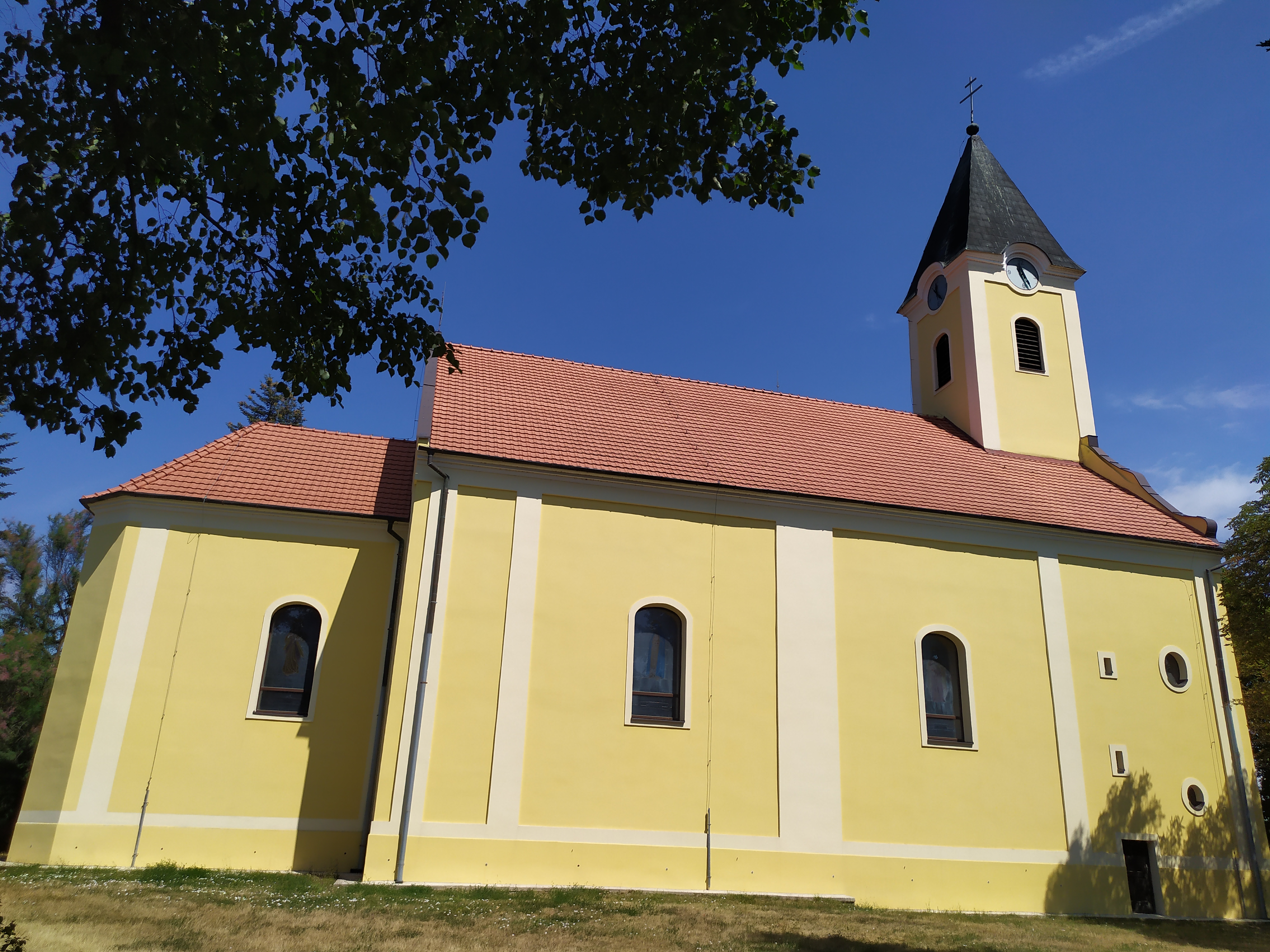
- Church of Saint Emeric

- Flag

- Location of Báb, Nitra District in the Nitra Region Location of Báb, Nitra District in Slovakia
- Coordinates: 48.31°N 17.87°E
- Country: Slovakia
- Region: Nitra Region
- District: Nitra District
- First mentioned: 1156

Area
  - Total: 20.09 km^{2} (7.76 sq mi)
- Elevation: 163 m (535 ft)

Population (2025)
  - Total: 1,253
- Time zone: UTC+1 (CET)
  - Summer (DST): UTC+2 (CEST)
- Postal code: 951 34
- Area code: +421 37
- Vehicle registration plate (until 2022): NR
- Website: www.obecbab.sk/70/obec

Báb (Hungarian: Báb) is a village and municipality in the Nitra District in western central Slovakia, in the Nitra Region.

== History ==
The village was created in 1955 from the merger of two formerly independent villages, Malý Báb and Velký Báb. Veľký Báb was first mentioned in historical records in 1156 and Malý Báb in 1365. Before the establishment of independent Czechoslovakia in 1918, the two villages were part of Nyitra County within the Kingdom of Hungary. From 1939 to 1945, they were part of the Slovak Republic.

== Geography ==
The municipality lies at an altitude of 163 metres (535 ft) and covers an area of 20.09 km^{2} (7.76 sq mi) (2025).

== Population ==
Population statistic (10 years)
| Year | 1995 | 2005 | 2015 | 2025 |
|---|---|---|---|---|
| Count | 968 | 967 | 1085 | 1253 |
| Difference | | −0.10% | +12.20% | +15.48% |

Population statistic
| Year | 2024 | 2025 |
|---|---|---|
| Count | 1238 | 1253 |
| Difference | | +1.21% |

It has a population of 1253 people (31 December 2025).

=== Ethnicity ===
Census 2021 (1+ %)
| Ethnicity | Number | Fraction |
|---|---|---|
| Slovak | 1146 | 95.89% |
| Not found out | 39 | 3.26% |
| Total | 1195 | |

In year 2021 was 1195 people by ethnicity 1146 as Slovak, 39 as Not found out, 10 as Czech, 7 as Russian, 5 as Other, 3 as Hungarian, 2 as Bulgarian, 1 as Vietnamese, 1 as Ukrainian, 1 as Italian and 1 as Romani.

Note on population: The difference values of population numbers in the table "Population statistic" and in the sections "Ethnicity" & "Religion" is caused by the use of various statistical methods.

=== Religion ===
Census 2021 (1+ %)
| Religion | Number | Fraction |
|---|---|---|
| Roman Catholic Church | 863 | 72.22% |
| None | 238 | 19.92% |
| Not found out | 42 | 3.51% |
| Total | 1195 | |

In year 2021 was 1195 people by religion 863 from Roman Catholic Church, 238 from None, 42 from Not found out, 11 from Evangelical Church, 11 from Ad hoc movements, 10 from Other, 8 from Greek Catholic Church, 3 from Calvinist Church, 3 from Buddhism, 2 from Christian Congregations in Slovakia, 1 from Paganism and natural spirituality, 1 from Other and not ascertained christian church, 1 from Islam and 1 from United Methodist Church.

== Facilities ==
The village has a public library, a gym, and a football pitch.

== Genealogical resources ==
The records for genealogical research are available at the state archive in Bratislava (Slovak: Štátny archív v Bratislave) and the state archive in Nitra (Slovak: Štátny archív v Nitre).

- Roman Catholic church records (births/marriages/deaths): 1734-1896 (parish: B)
- Census records 1869 of Báb are not available at the state archive.

== See also ==
- List of municipalities and towns in Slovakia
