= Liptovská Osada =

- Municipality
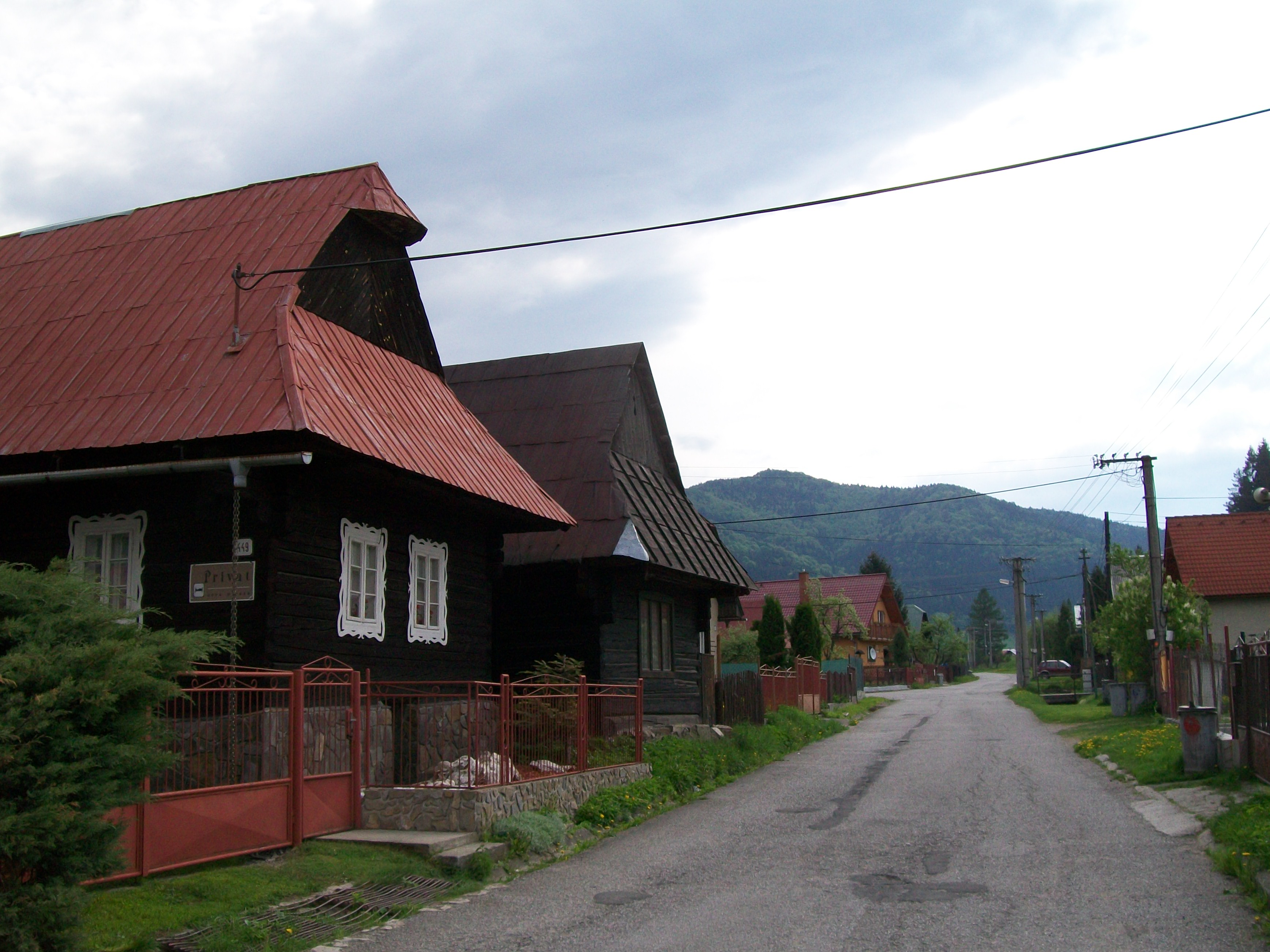

- Flag

- Location of Liptovská Osada in the Žilina Region Location of Liptovská Osada in Slovakia
- Coordinates: 48.95°N 19.27°E
- Country: Slovakia
- Region: Žilina Region
- District: Ružomberok District
- First mentioned: 1649

Area
  - Total: 50.19 km^{2} (19.38 sq mi)
- Elevation: 714 m (2,343 ft)

Population (2025)
  - Total: 1,563
- Time zone: UTC+1 (CET)
  - Summer (DST): UTC+2 (CEST)
- Postal code: 347 3
- Area code: +421 44
- Vehicle registration plate (until 2022): RK
- Website: www.liptovskaosada.com

Liptovská Osada (Hungarian: Oszada) is a village and municipality in Ružomberok District in the Žilina Region of northern Slovakia.

== History ==
In historical records the village was first mentioned in 1649.

== Geography ==
The municipality lies at an altitude of 714 metres (2,343 ft) and covers an area of 50.19 km^{2} (19.38 sq mi) (2025).

== Population ==
Population statistic (10 years)
Year	1995	2005	2015	2025
Count	1704	1592	1646	1563
Difference		−6.57%	+3.39%	−5.04%

Population statistic
Year	2024	2025
Count	1564	1563
Difference		−0.06%

It has a population of 1563 people (31 December 2025).

=== Ethnicity ===
Census 2021 (1+ %)
Ethnicity	Number	Fraction
Slovak	1538	95.11%
Not found out	80	4.94%
Total	1617	

In year 2021 was 1617 people by ethnicity 1538 as Slovak, 80 as Not found out, 9 as Other, 8 as Czech, 3 as Russian, 2 as Italian, 2 as German, 1 as Rusyn and 1 as Moravian.

Note on population: The difference values of population numbers in the table "Population statistic" and in the sections "Ethnicity" & "Religion" is caused by the use of various statistical methods.

=== Religion ===
Census 2021 (1+ %)
Religion	Number	Fraction
Roman Catholic Church	1283	79.34%
None	226	13.98%
Not found out	71	4.39%
Evangelical Church	18	1.11%
Total	1617	

In year 2021 was 1617 people by religion 1283 from Roman Catholic Church, 226 from None, 71 from Not found out, 18 from Evangelical Church, 7 from Ad hoc movements, 2 from Paganism and natural spirituality, 2 from Jehovah's Witnesses, 2 from Christian Congregations in Slovakia, 2 from Other, 1 from Calvinist Church, 1 from Greek Catholic Church, 1 from Church of the Brethren and 1 from Apostolic Church.

== Churches in village ==
- Roman Catholic Church of st. John Baptist
- Church of Czechoslovak Hussite Church
