= Dolná Streda =

Dolná Streda Alsószerdahely
- Municipality
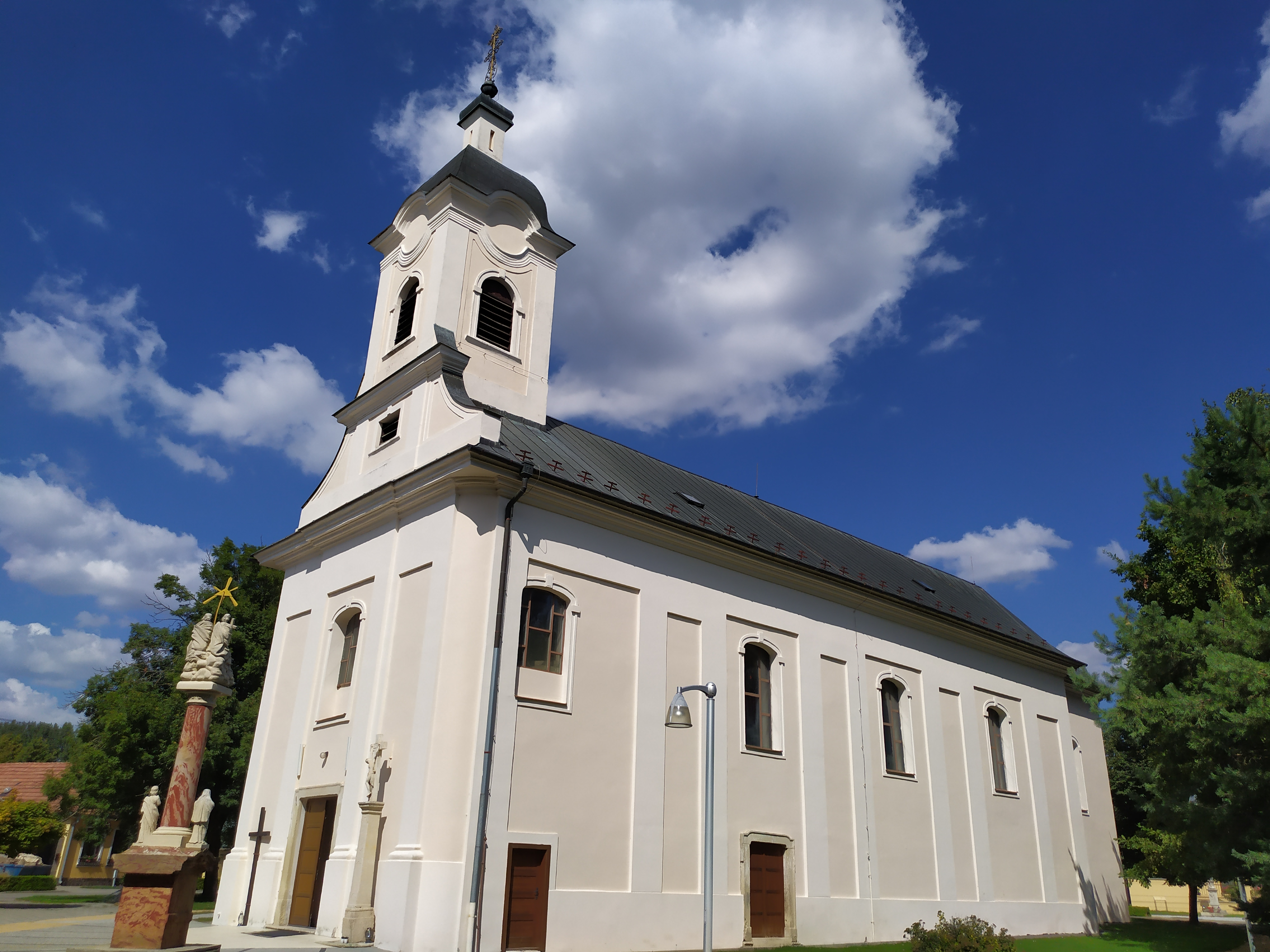
- Dolná Streda Church of St. Jakub the Elder

- Flag

- Location of Dolná Streda in the Trnava Region Location of Dolná Streda in Slovakia
- Coordinates: 48.27°N 17.75°E
- Country: Slovakia
- Region: Trnava Region
- District: Galanta District
- First mentioned: 1283

Area
  - Total: 13.23 km^{2} (5.11 sq mi)
- Elevation: 125 m (410 ft)

Population (2025)
  - Total: 1,766
- Time zone: UTC+1 (CET)
  - Summer (DST): UTC+2 (CEST)
- Postal code: 925 63
- Area code: +421 31
- Vehicle registration plate (until 2022): GA
- Website: www.dolnastreda.sk

Dolná Streda (Hungarian: Alsószerdahely) is a village and municipality in the Galanta District of the Trnava Region of western Slovakia.

== History ==
In historical records the village was first mentioned in 1283. Before the establishment of independent Czechoslovakia in 1918, it was part of Pozsony County within the Kingdom of Hungary.

== Geography ==
The municipality lies at an altitude of 125 metres (410 ft) and covers an area of 13.23 km^{2} (5.11 sq mi) (2025).

== Population ==
Population statistic (10 years)
Year	1995	2005	2015	2025
Count	1231	1404	1475	1766
Difference		+14.05%	+5.05%	+19.72%

Population statistic
Year	2024	2025
Count	1778	1766
Difference		−0.67%

It has a population of 1766 people (31 December 2025).

=== Ethnicity ===
Census 2021 (1+ %)
Ethnicity	Number	Fraction
Slovak	1576	95.28%
Not found out	47	2.84%
Hungarian	22	1.33%
Total	1654	

In year 2021 was 1654 people by ethnicity 1576 as Slovak, 47 as Not found out, 22 as Hungarian, 15 as Czech, 8 as Vietnamese, 6 as Other, 2 as German, 1 as Ukrainian, 1 as Italian, 1 as Serbian, 1 as Romani, 1 as Russian and 1 as Romanian.

Note on population: The difference values of population numbers in the table "Population statistic" and in the sections "Ethnicity" & "Religion" is caused by the use of various statistical methods.

=== Religion ===
Census 2021 (1+ %)
Religion	Number	Fraction
Roman Catholic Church	1008	60.94%
None	492	29.75%
Not found out	82	4.96%
Total	1654	

In year 2021 was 1654 people by religion 1008 from Roman Catholic Church, 492 from None, 82 from Not found out, 13 from Apostolic Church, 11 from Greek Catholic Church, 11 from Evangelical Church, 8 from United Methodist Church, 6 from Christian Congregations in Slovakia, 5 from Other, 4 from Jehovah's Witnesses, 4 from Ad hoc movements, 3 from Calvinist Church, 3 from Other and not ascertained christian church, 1 from Eastern Orthodox Church, 1 from Islam, 1 from Seventh-day Adventist Church and 1 from Buddhism.

== Genealogical resources ==
The records for genealogical research are available at the state archive "Statny Archiv in Bratislava, Slovakia"

- Roman Catholic church records (births/marriages/deaths): 1717-1895 (parish A)

== See also ==
- List of municipalities and towns in Slovakia
