= Šoporňa =

- Municipality
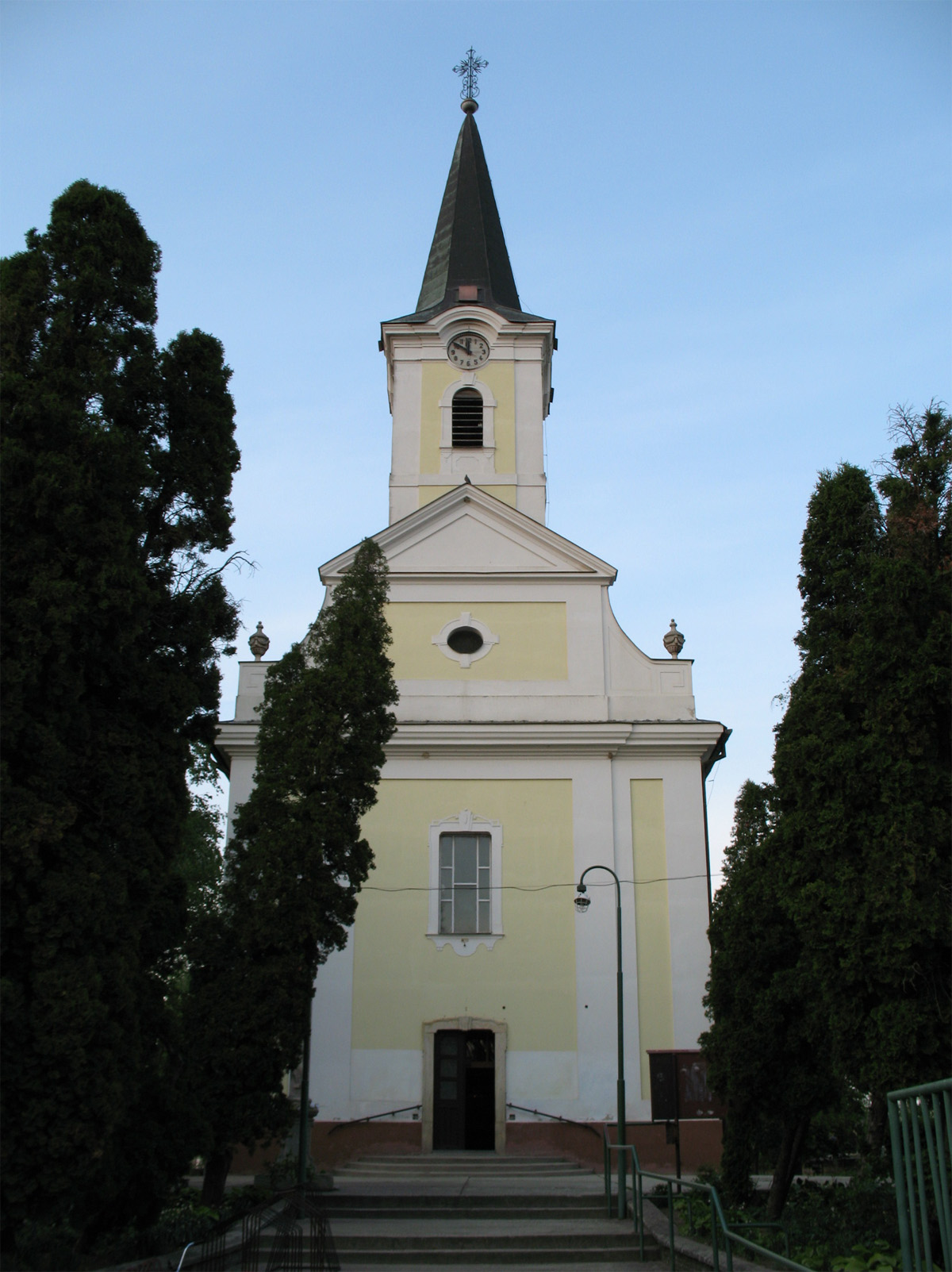

- Flag

- Location of Šoporňa in the Trnava Region Location of Šoporňa in Slovakia
- Coordinates: 48.25°N 17.82°E
- Country: Slovakia
- Region: Trnava Region
- District: Galanta District
- First mentioned: 1251

Area
  - Total: 31.22 km^{2} (12.05 sq mi)
- Elevation: 122 m (400 ft)

Population (2025)
  - Total: 4,018
- Time zone: UTC+1 (CET)
  - Summer (DST): UTC+2 (CEST)
- Postal code: 925 52
- Area code: +421 31
- Vehicle registration plate (until 2022): GA
- Website: www.soporna.sk

Šoporňa (Hungarian: Sopornya) is a village and municipality in Galanta District of the Trnava Region of south-west Slovakia.

== History ==
In historical records the village was first mentioned in 1251, when it was called Supurni. The name is recorded as Soporny in 1411 and as Sopornok in 1420. The town became an autonomous settlement during the seventeenth century with local administrative work having its own seal. By the end of eighteenth century, it was a town with 295 houses and almost 2,000 inhabitants. Before the establishment of independent Czechoslovakia in 1918, it was part of Nyitra County within the Kingdom of Hungary.

== Geography ==
The municipality lies at an altitude of 122 metres (400 ft) and covers an area of 31.22 km^{2} (12.05 sq mi) (2025).

=== Street names ===
- Argentínska
- Budovateľská
- Červenej armády
- Československej armády
- Družstevná
- Dukelská
- Fazuľová
- Fučíkova
- Gagarinova
- Gottwaldova
- Jana Amosa Komenského
- Kapitána Nálepku
- Kollárova
- Krásna
- Krátka
- Lesná
- Mierová
- Mládežnícka
- Mlynská
- Nábrežná
- Nešporova
- Nitrianska
- Novozámocká
- Poštová
- Sereďská
- Slnečná
- Stromová
- Šaľská
- Vážska
- Vladimíra Iľjiča Lenina

== Population ==
Population statistic (10 years)
Year	1995	2005	2015	2025
Count	4006	4136	4195	4018
Difference		+3.24%	+1.42%	−4.21%

Population statistic
Year	2024	2025
Count	4032	4018
Difference		−0.34%

It has a population of 4018 people (31 December 2025).

=== Ethnicity ===
Census 2021 (1+ %)
Ethnicity	Number	Fraction
Slovak	3814	93.45%
Not found out	237	5.8%
Total	4081	

In year 2021 was 4081 people by ethnicity 3814 as Slovak, 237 as Not found out, 28 as Hungarian, 27 as Czech, 11 as Romani, 10 as Russian, 4 as Serbian, 4 as Other, 3 as Rusyn, 3 as Romanian, 2 as Vietnamese, 2 as Polish, 2 as Moravian, 2 as English, 1 as Jewish and 1 as Croatian.

Note on population: The difference values of population numbers in the table "Population statistic" and in the sections "Ethnicity" & "Religion" is caused by the use of various statistical methods.

=== Religion ===
Census 2021 (1+ %)
Religion	Number	Fraction
Roman Catholic Church	2634	64.54%
None	1097	26.88%
Not found out	233	5.71%
Total	4081	

In year 2021 was 4081 people by religion 2634 from Roman Catholic Church, 1097 from None, 233 from Not found out, 22 from Greek Catholic Church, 20 from Evangelical Church, 18 from Christian Congregations in Slovakia, 15 from Ad hoc movements, 12 from Other, 8 from Eastern Orthodox Church, 5 from Calvinist Church, 4 from Jehovah's Witnesses, 3 from Paganism and natural spirituality, 3 from Other and not ascertained christian church, 3 from Buddhism, 2 from United Methodist Church, 1 from Jewish community and 1 from Apostolic Church.

== Architectural monument ==
The chapel of St. Anna is an architectural monument in Soporna. The chapel was built in 1750. Reconstruction of the building has occurred to keep it in good condition.

== See also ==
- List of municipalities and towns in Slovakia
