= Hájske =

Village and municipality in Nitra Region, Slovakia

Hájske Köpösd
- Municipality
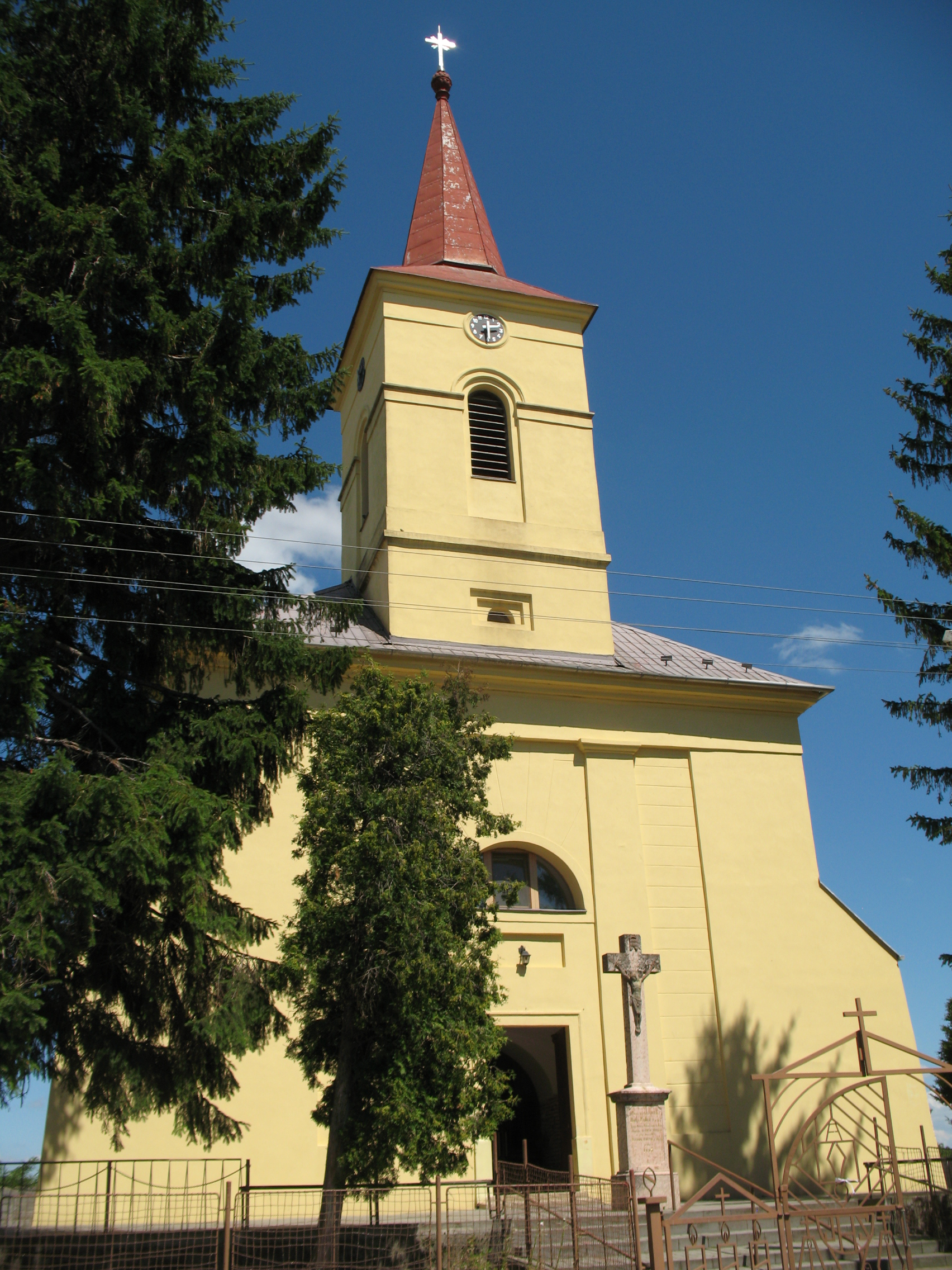
- Church of Saint Barbara

- Flag

- Location of Hájske in the Nitra Region Location of Hájske in Slovakia
- Coordinates: 48.25°N 17.87°E
- Country: Slovakia
- Region: Nitra Region
- District: Šaľa District
- First mentioned: 1113

Area
  - Total: 14.08 km^{2} (5.44 sq mi)
- Elevation: 126 m (413 ft)

Population (2025)
  - Total: 1,307
- Time zone: UTC+1 (CET)
  - Summer (DST): UTC+2 (CEST)
- Postal code: 951 33
- Area code: +421 37
- Vehicle registration plate (until 2022): SA
- Website: www.hajske.sk

Hájske (Hungarian: Köpösd) is a village and municipality in Šaľa District, in the Nitra Region of southwest Slovakia.

== History ==
In historical records the village was first mentioned in 1113.

== Geography ==
The municipality lies at an altitude of 126 metres (413 ft) and covers an area of 14.08 km^{2} (5.44 sq mi) (2025).

== Population ==
Population statistic (10 years)
Year	1995	2005	2015	2025
Count	1363	1378	1309	1307
Difference		+1.10%	−5.00%	−0.15%

Population statistic
Year	2024	2025
Count	1315	1307
Difference		−0.60%

It has a population of 1307 people (31 December 2025).

=== Ethnicity ===
Census 2021 (1+ %)
Ethnicity	Number	Fraction
Slovak	1230	91.38%
Not found out	101	7.5%
Total	1346	

In year 2021 was 1346 people by ethnicity 1230 as Slovak, 101 as Not found out, 12 as Hungarian, 11 as Romani, 9 as Czech, 6 as Canadian, 2 as Rusyn, 2 as Other, 2 as English, 1 as Ukrainian and 1 as Russian.

Note on population: The difference values of population numbers in the table "Population statistic" and in the sections "Ethnicity" & "Religion" is caused by the use of various statistical methods.

=== Religion ===
Census 2021 (1+ %)
Religion	Number	Fraction
Roman Catholic Church	962	71.47%
None	208	15.45%
Not found out	124	9.21%
Total	1346	

In year 2021 was 1346 people by religion 962 from Roman Catholic Church, 208 from None, 124 from Not found out, 11 from Other and not ascertained christian church, 10 from Greek Catholic Church, 10 from Evangelical Church, 8 from Other, 4 from Apostolic Church, 3 from Calvinist Church, 2 from Christian Congregations in Slovakia, 2 from Ad hoc movements, 1 from Eastern Orthodox Church and 1 from United Methodist Church.

== Facilities ==
The village has a public library and a football pitch.

Hajske also has the distinction of being the home of cricket in Slovakia. The club attracts players from the village itself as well as from the expatriate community in Bratislava. The club has its own website at where contact details and history are found.

== See also ==
- List of municipalities and towns in Slovakia
