= Sereď =

Town in Slovakia

- Municipality
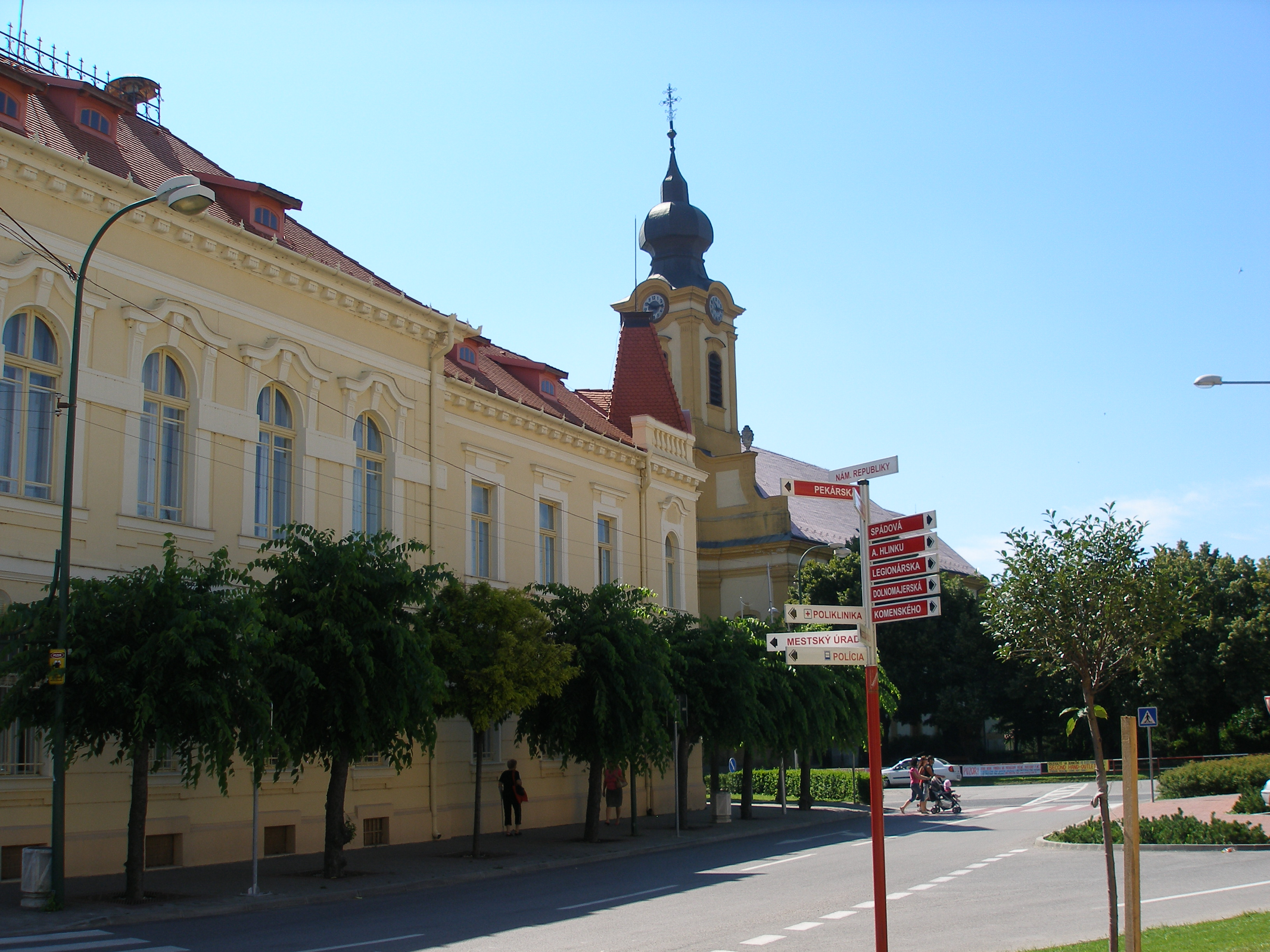
- View of Sereď

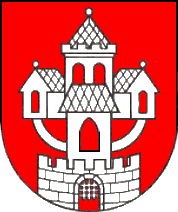
- Flag Coat of arms

- Location of Sereď in the Trnava Region Location of Sereď in Slovakia
- Coordinates: 48.29°N 17.73°E
- Country: Slovakia
- Region: Trnava Region
- District: Galanta District
- First mentioned: 1313

Government
  - Mayor: Ing. Martin Tomčányi

Area
  - Total: 30.72 km^{2} (11.86 sq mi)
- Elevation: 128 m (420 ft)

Population (2025)
  - Total: 14,946
- Time zone: UTC+1 (CET)
  - Summer (DST): UTC+2 (CEST)
- Postal code: 926 01
- Area code: +421 31
- Vehicle registration plate (until 2022): GA
- Website: www.sered.sk

Sereď (Slovak pronunciation: [ˈserec]; Hungarian: Szered [ˈsɛrɛd]) is a town in southern Slovakia near Trnava, on the right bank of the Váh River on the Danubian Lowland. It has approximately 15,500 inhabitants.

== Geography ==
The municipality lies at an altitude of 128 metres (420 ft) and covers an area of 30.72 km^{2} (11.86 sq mi) (2025). It is located in the Danubian Lowland on the Váh river, around 20 kilometres (12 mi) south-east of Trnava, 33 kilometres (21 mi) west of Nitra and around 55 kilometres (34 mi) east from Bratislava. The closest mountain ranges are the Little Carpathians to the west and Považský Inovec to the north.

== History ==
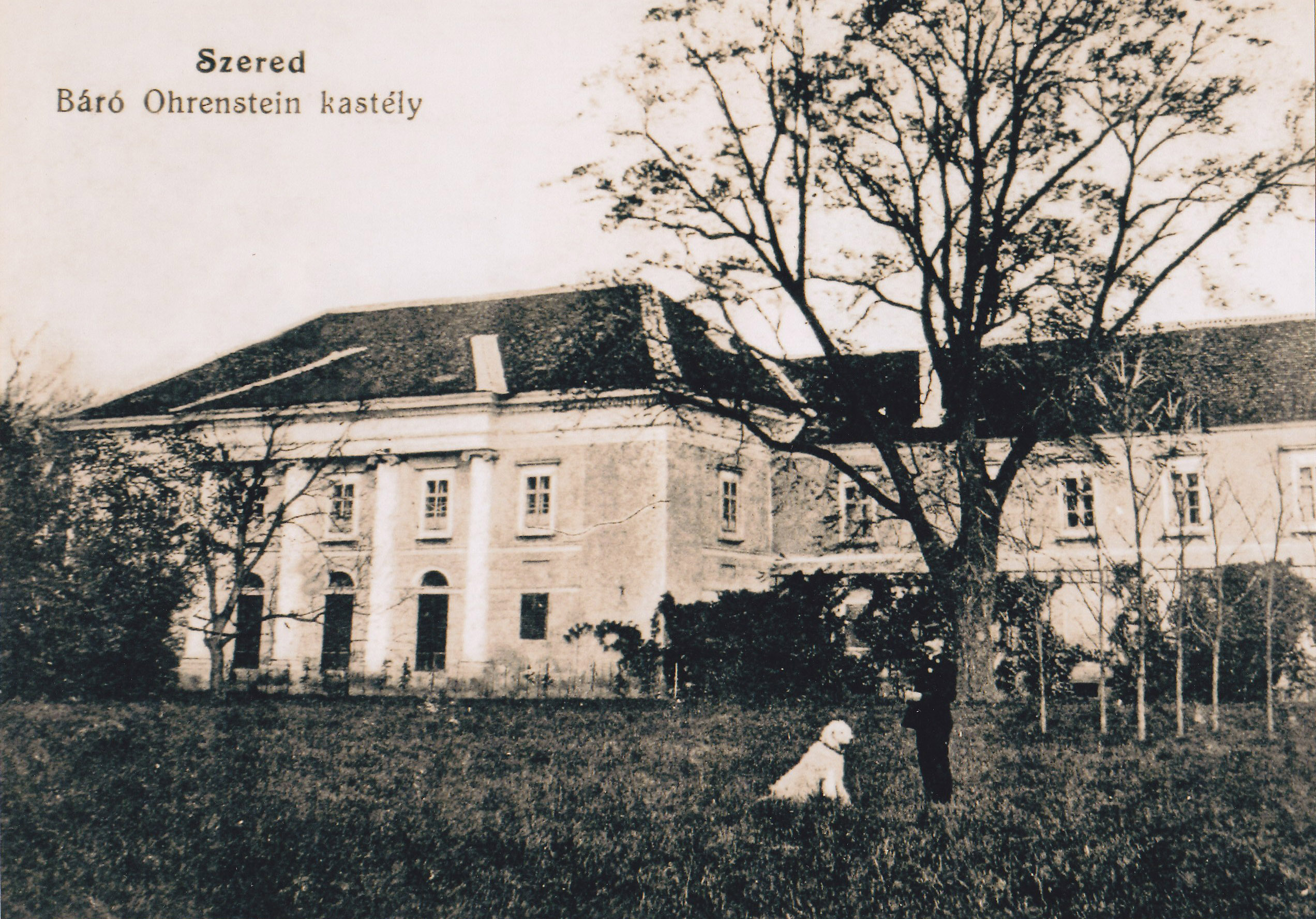

The town was first mentioned in 1313 as Zereth. In the Middle Ages, it lay on the trade route called "Bohemian Road" which ran from Buda to Prague on the right bank of the Váh river. Thanks to its location, livestock and grain markets were held in the town and thousands of cattle moved through the town each year. Its commercial importance ended in 1846, when the Pozsony-Nagyszombat (now: Bratislava-Trnava) railway was built. However, the Seredian market tradition survived and the Seredian Market and Bier festival is held every year on St. John Baptist's Day (24 June). Sered had also been a large raft port and an important waterway until 1943 when a dam was built on the river Váh at Nosice. Since rafts carried not only wood but also salt from Poland, a major salt warehouse was built and the salt authority operated here. Its good location also attracted industrial investment. In 1845, a sugar refinery, later coffee processing and baking plant was opened.

In 1910, it had a population of 5371, among them 2941 Slovaks, 1943 Hungarians and 429 Germans. Until 1918, it belonged to Galánta District of Pozsony County of the Kingdom of Hungary. After the Treaty of Trianon, the town became part of Czechoslovakia in 1920.

=== World War II ===
Sereď was the site of one of three labour camps for Jews established in the first Slovak Republic, a Nazi client state during World War II. The Jewish Code adopted by Slovakia in 1941 established labour camps for Jews. During the winter of 1941–1942, a team of Jewish craftsmen was sent to a military camp near Sereď to prepare the camp for Jewish labour draftees. Before the work was completed, the Slovak authorities had utilised the camp as a detention centre for Jews and as a staging ground for deportation to Poland. The Hlinka Guard, commanded by Imrich Vasina, oversaw the camp.

In five transports, 4,500 Jews were deported from the Sereď camp to Poland. In 1944, an underground movement was organized in the camp and weapons were smuggled in. Many Jews left the camp and joined the partisans when the camp was opened during the Slovak National Uprising in August 1944. Shortly thereafter, however, the Germans regained control over western Slovakia, and the camp was enlarged under the command of Alois Brunner. Over the next several months during the winter of 1944 and spring of 1945, 13,500 Jews were deported from Sereď to Auschwitz and Theresienstadt. The camp was liberated by the Red Army on 1 April 1945.

== Economy ==
Since 1845, sugar has been produced from sugar beets grown on the nearby fields. Since the 19th century, coffee substitutes as rye and malt coffee or chicory have also been produced in Sereď. The town is known for its production of cookies, biscuits, and wafers.

In 1950, the sparkling wine manufacturer, Hubert company moved to the town. By utilizing its rich wine-making tradition, a modern wine-processing factory was established in the town during the 1950s. Wine is produced here using the latest technology. Today, sparkling wine is produced using classical champagne techniques, and in-tank fermentation is used as well.

Sereď was a centre of nickel production during the socialist era, but after its fall, the foundry was closed down in order to protect Sereď as a traditional agricultural region.

A few years ago a producer of glass woven goods started its production in Sereď. A factory producing a wide range of garden concrete paving stones started its business here, too.

== Population ==
Historical population
Year	Pop.	±%
1970	11,392	—
1980	14,568	+27.9%
1991	16,612	+14.0%
2001	17,406	+4.8%
2011	16,235	−6.7%
2021	15,737	−3.1%
Source: Censuses

Population statistic (10 years)
Year	1995	2005	2015	2025
Count	17,662	17,224	15,923	14,946
Difference		−2.47%	−7.55%	−6.13%

Population statistic
Year	2024	2025
Count	15,059	14,946
Difference		−0.75%

It has a population of 14,946 people (31 December 2025).

=== Ethnicity ===
Census 2021 (1+ %)
Ethnicity	Number	Fraction
Slovak	14,433	91.71%
Not found out	1081	6.86%
Hungarian	168	1.06%
Total	15,737	

In year 2021 was 15,737 people by ethnicity 14,433 as Slovak, 1081 as Not found out, 168 as Hungarian, 123 as Czech, 35 as Other, 27 as Russian, 22 as Romani, 21 as Vietnamese, 18 as German, 12 as Romanian, 11 as Rusyn, 8 as Serbian, 5 as Jewish, 5 as Ukrainian, 4 as Italian, 4 as Moravian, 3 as Polish, 3 as English, 2 as Irish, 2 as Turkish, 2 as Albanian, 1 as Korean, 1 as French, 1 as Croatian and 1 as Bulgarian.

Note on population: The difference values of population numbers in the table "Population statistic" and in the sections "Ethnicity" & "Religion" is caused by the use of various statistical methods.

In 1880, the population was 5,004, with Jews accounting for 27%. The Jews were active in business and owned the local sugar refinery. The Jewish community was wiped out in the Holocaust.

=== Religion ===
Census 2021 (1+ %)
Religion	Number	Fraction
Roman Catholic Church	8468	53.81%
None	5103	32.43%
Not found out	1362	8.65%
Evangelical Church	239	1.52%
Total	15,737	

In year 2021 was 15,737 people by religion 8468 from Roman Catholic Church, 5103 from None, 1362 from Not found out, 239 from Evangelical Church, 81 from Apostolic Church, 74 from Greek Catholic Church, 67 from Christian Congregations in Slovakia, 55 from Ad hoc movements, 47 from Other, 38 from United Methodist Church, 36 from Other and not ascertained christian church, 35 from Calvinist Church, 29 from Eastern Orthodox Church, 25 from Jehovah's Witnesses, 22 from Islam, 19 from Buddhism, 13 from Paganism and natural spirituality, 12 from Seventh-day Adventist Church, 4 from Jewish community, 3 from Old Catholic Church, 3 from Hinduism, 1 from Czechoslovak Hussite Church and 1 from Baptists Church.

== Landmarks ==
The historically most important building is the Esterházy manor-house (castle) which is located on the site of the once famous medieval water-castle of Sempte. The manor-house was built in 1840 in classicist style; it was later altered in empire style. It is now in ruins and awaits restoration. The remains of the medieval castle are hidden in its walls. The local authority and civil association "Vodný Hrad" do their best to save this symbol of the town.

John the Baptist Church is situated on the opposite place of the former parish church since 1781. When the former church burned down on 2 August 1777, the Esterhazy family decided to build a new one and they moved there the two renaissance tomb-stones with relief of anti-Turkish warriors.

The Holy Trinity-column can be seen left from the church. It was erected in the second half of the 18th century in baroque style with the sculptures of Saint Peter, Saint Paul and Saint Anne.

The old City Hall was built in 1909 by architect János Tomascheck, native of Sereď. There is a great council chamber in the building, which is now used as marriage room. It is decorated with valuable paintings depicting views of St. Petersburg brought by Nikolaus Esterházy from his diplomatic mission in 1771.

The Slovak Holocaust Museum will open in Sered in January 2016.

== Notable residents ==
- Juraj Fándly, writer
- Filip Müller, Holocaust survivor and memoirist
- Max Weiss, chess player
- Dušan Kabát, football player

== Twin towns – sister cities ==
Sereď is twinned with:

- Tišnov, Czech Republic

== Gallery ==
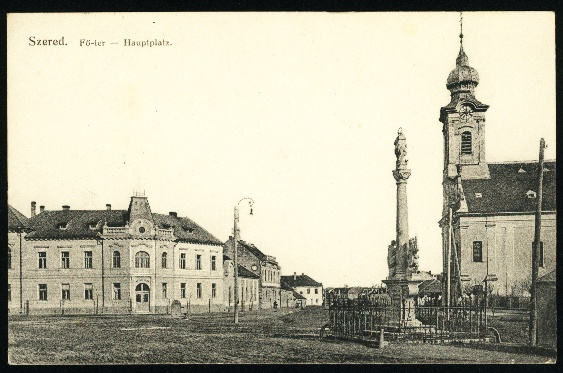
Main Square

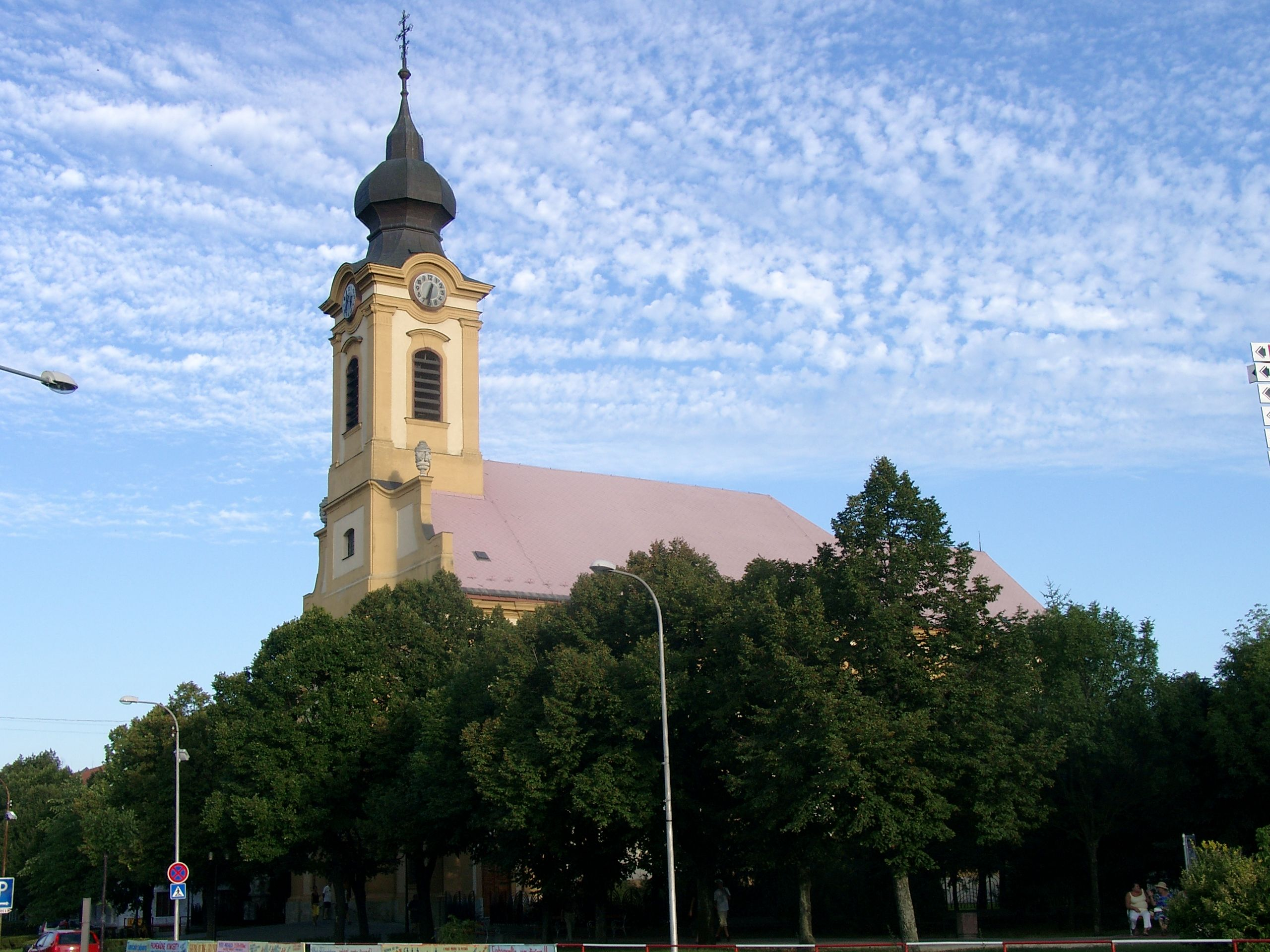
John the Baptist Church

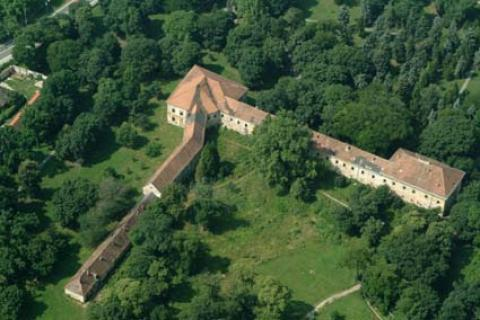
The Esterházy manor-house from the air
