= Šintava =

- Municipality
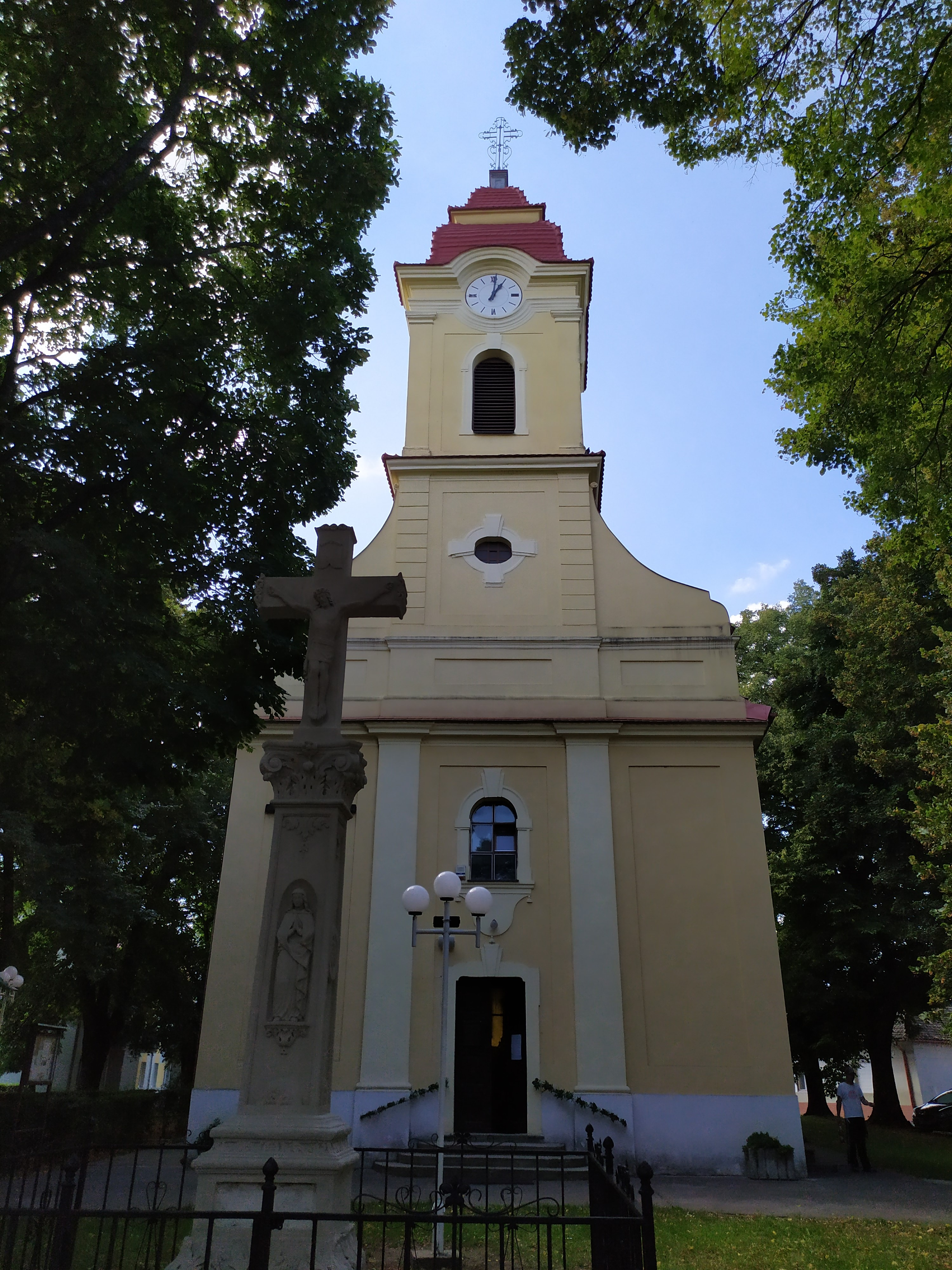

- Flag Coat of arms

- Location of Šintava in the Trnava Region Location of Šintava in Slovakia
- Coordinates: 48.28°N 17.77°E
- Country: Slovakia
- Region: Trnava Region
- District: Galanta District
- First mentioned: 1074

Area
  - Total: 12.79 km^{2} (4.94 sq mi)
- Elevation: 135 m (443 ft)

Population (2025)
  - Total: 1,709
- Time zone: UTC+1 (CET)
  - Summer (DST): UTC+2 (CEST)
- Postal code: 925 51
- Area code: +421 31
- Vehicle registration plate (until 2022): GA
- Website: www.sintava.sk

Šintava (Hungarian: Sempte) is a village and municipality in Galanta District of the Trnava Region of south-west Slovakia.

== History ==
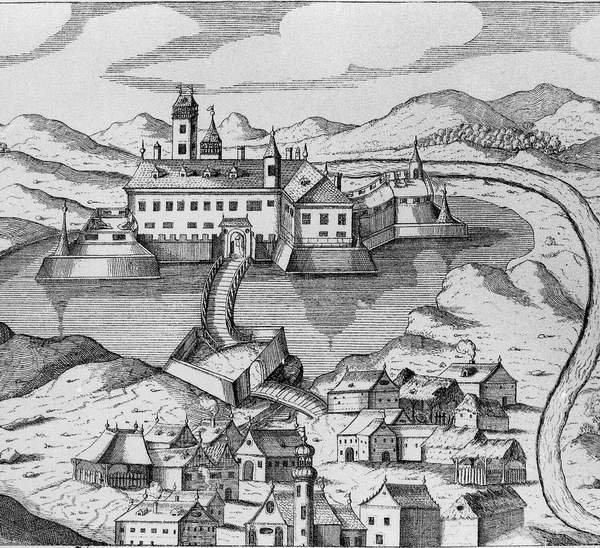
Sintava Castle, one of the most significant castles in Slovakia

In historical records the village is first mentioned in 1042, when King Peter, the successor of Stephen I of Hungary, having been deposed from his throne united with German emperor Henry III to gain back his country. They launched campaign against King Samuel Aba who, in 1041, had been elected king by the aristocrats who had toppled King Peter. Peter and Henry conquered Pozsony (now: Bratislava) and the whole area of the river Vah, castles Šintava, Galgóc (now: Hlohovec), Bana and they reached up to river Hron.

A second written historical report comes from Vienna picture chronicle in 1074, mentioning Šintava castle as the place where overthrown King Salomon of Hungary, son of King Andrew, was given assistance by Emperor Henry IV of Germany. They fought for Salomon to regain his throne, which had been occupied by King Géza, who had his residence in Nitra. The chronicle shows: "And when the emperor came to the river Vah, Solomon rode on horseback with three formations from Šintava towards Nitra". The settlement had Hungarian majority in the 17th century according to the Turkish tax census.

Before the establishment of independent Czechoslovakia in 1918, Šintava was part of Nyitra County within the Kingdom of Hungary.

== Geography ==
The municipality lies at an altitude of 135 metres (443 ft) and covers an area of 12.79 km^{2} (4.94 sq mi) (2025).

== Population ==
Population statistic (10 years)
Year	1995	2005	2015	2025
Count	1608	1734	1720	1709
Difference		+7.83%	−0.80%	−0.63%

Population statistic
Year	2024	2025
Count	1712	1709
Difference		−0.17%

It has a population of 1709 people (31 December 2025).

=== Ethnicity ===
Census 2021 (1+ %)
Ethnicity	Number	Fraction
Slovak	1697	96.75%
Not found out	46	2.62%
Total	1754	

In year 2021 was 1754 people by ethnicity 1697 as Slovak, 46 as Not found out, 14 as Hungarian, 6 as Czech, 4 as Other, 3 as German, 2 as Romani, 2 as Moravian, 2 as Croatian and 1 as Polish.

Note on population: The difference values of population numbers in the table "Population statistic" and in the sections "Ethnicity" & "Religion" is caused by the use of various statistical methods.

=== Religion ===
Census 2021 (1+ %)
Religion	Number	Fraction
Roman Catholic Church	1181	67.33%
None	458	26.11%
Not found out	54	3.08%
Evangelical Church	18	1.03%
Total	1754	

In year 2021 was 1754 people by religion 1181 from Roman Catholic Church, 458 from None, 54 from Not found out, 18 from Evangelical Church, 9 from Greek Catholic Church, 8 from Other, 7 from Jehovah's Witnesses, 6 from Christian Congregations in Slovakia, 5 from Ad hoc movements, 4 from Other and not ascertained christian church, 3 from Paganism and natural spirituality and 1 from Calvinist Church.
