= D3 motorway (Slovakia) =

Motorway in Slovakia

D3 Motorway
- Diaľnica D3
- Completed Under construction Planned

Route information
- Part of E75
- Length: 59.1 km (36.7 mi) Under construction: 22 km (14 mi)

Major junctions
- From: D1 near Hričovské Podhradie
- R5 near Svrčinovec (planned)
- To: S1 border with Poland

Location
- Country: Slovakia
- Regions: Žilina Region
- Major cities: Žilina, Čadca

Highway system
- Highways in Slovakia
← D2	→ D4

D3 motorway (Slovak: Diaľnica D3) (formerly D18), sometimes called the Kysuce Motorway, is a motorway in northern Slovakia. Initially, it is supposed to be only a two-lane motorway in the Svrčinovec - Slovak/Polish border section, and four-lane motorway in the remaining Hričovské Podhradie - Čadca section. The D3 motorway is part of the main route of the 6th Pan-European corridor and it lies on these E-roads: E50, E75 and E442. When completed, it will become the third longest Slovak motorway.

The construction of the D3 motorway is extremely technically demanding as it takes place in the mountainous terrain of northern Slovakia. There are a total of four tunnels on the D3 motorway with a total length of slightly more than 4 kilometres (2.5 mi). Currently, three of these four tunnels are in operation in a half profile, the Horelica tunnel (605 m), the Poľana tunnel (898 m), the Svrčinovec tunnel (420 m) and one tunnel in a full profile, the Považský Chlmec tunnel (2,249 m)

It starts at the motorway junction with the D1, bypassing Žilina, then goes to the north around Kysucké Nové Mesto and Čadca, having an interchange with the R5, and ends near the village of Skalité, where it crosses the Polish border and connects to Expressway S1. This is one of the most important motorways in Slovakia and a vignette is required to use the motorway.

== Chronology ==
The construction of a 5.6 kilometres (3.5 mi) stretch of the D3 highway between Čadca, Bukov and Svrčinovec (in the Kysuce area) started on 24 January 2017 with the tapping of the foundation stone in the centre of Čadca.

An open day was held at the Svrčinovec – Skalité section on 27 May 2017. The entire section was officially handed over for use on 10 June 2017, after twenty years of planning and construction. Construction was delayed for a year. It was estimated that the section is 9 minutes faster to drive after opening. The total cost of both sections was 417 million euros. The sections have a total length of 15,460 metres, 29 bridge structures with a total length of 3,782 metres, 2 tunnels, 2 junctions and one rest area.

Construction of the Horelica Tunnel northwest of Skalité began in July 2000, and the breakthrough was achieved in May 2002. The tunnel with Čadca bypass was opened on October 29, 2004, and it replaced road 11, which runs across the town of Čadca.

=== Future developments ===
Žilina-Sever - Čadca-Bukov is an under construction section with a length of 22 kilometres (14 mi), which will run parallel to the I/11 road. The construction process is planned to be finished in 2030.

== Route description ==
Country	Region	Location	km	mi	Exit	Name	Destinations	Notes
Slovakia	Žilina Region	Žilina Region	0	0.0	—	Hričovské Podhradie	D1 E50 E75 E442	Kilometrage starting point
Slovakia	Žilina Region	Žilina Region	2	1.2	—	Letisko Žilina	III/2091	
Slovakia	Žilina Region	Žilina Region	8	5.0	—	Žilina-západ	I/61 E442	
Slovakia	Žilina Region	Žilina Region	12	7.5	—	Žilina-sever	I/11	Temporary end
Slovakia	Žilina Region	Žilina Region	18	11	—	Kysucké Nové Mesto	I/11	Under construction
Slovakia	Žilina Region	Žilina Region	33	21	—	Krásno nad Kysucou	II/520	Whole junction to be reworked and upgraded
Slovakia	Žilina Region	Žilina Region	35	22	—	Oščadnica	I/11	Temporary start Temporary single carriageway from this point
Slovakia	Žilina Region	Žilina Region	39	24	—	Čadca-Bukov	I/11	Temporary single carriageway ends; transition to full profile
Slovakia	Žilina Region	Žilina Region	42	26	—	Čadca-Podzávoz	I/11	
Slovakia	Žilina Region	Žilina Region	45	28	—	Svrčinovec	I/11	Transition to half profile
Slovakia	Žilina Region	Žilina Region	45	28	—	Svrčinovec	R5 E75	To be expanded to the R5/E75 junction.
Slovakia	Žilina Region	Žilina Region	58	36	—	Skalité	I/12	
Slovakia	Žilina Region	Žilina Region	60	37	Poland-Slovakia border	Skalité–Zwardoń border crossing	S 1	Kilometrage end point Road continues as Polish S1
1.000 mi = 1.609 km; 1.000 km = 0.621 mi: Proposed; Route transition; Unopened

== Gallery ==
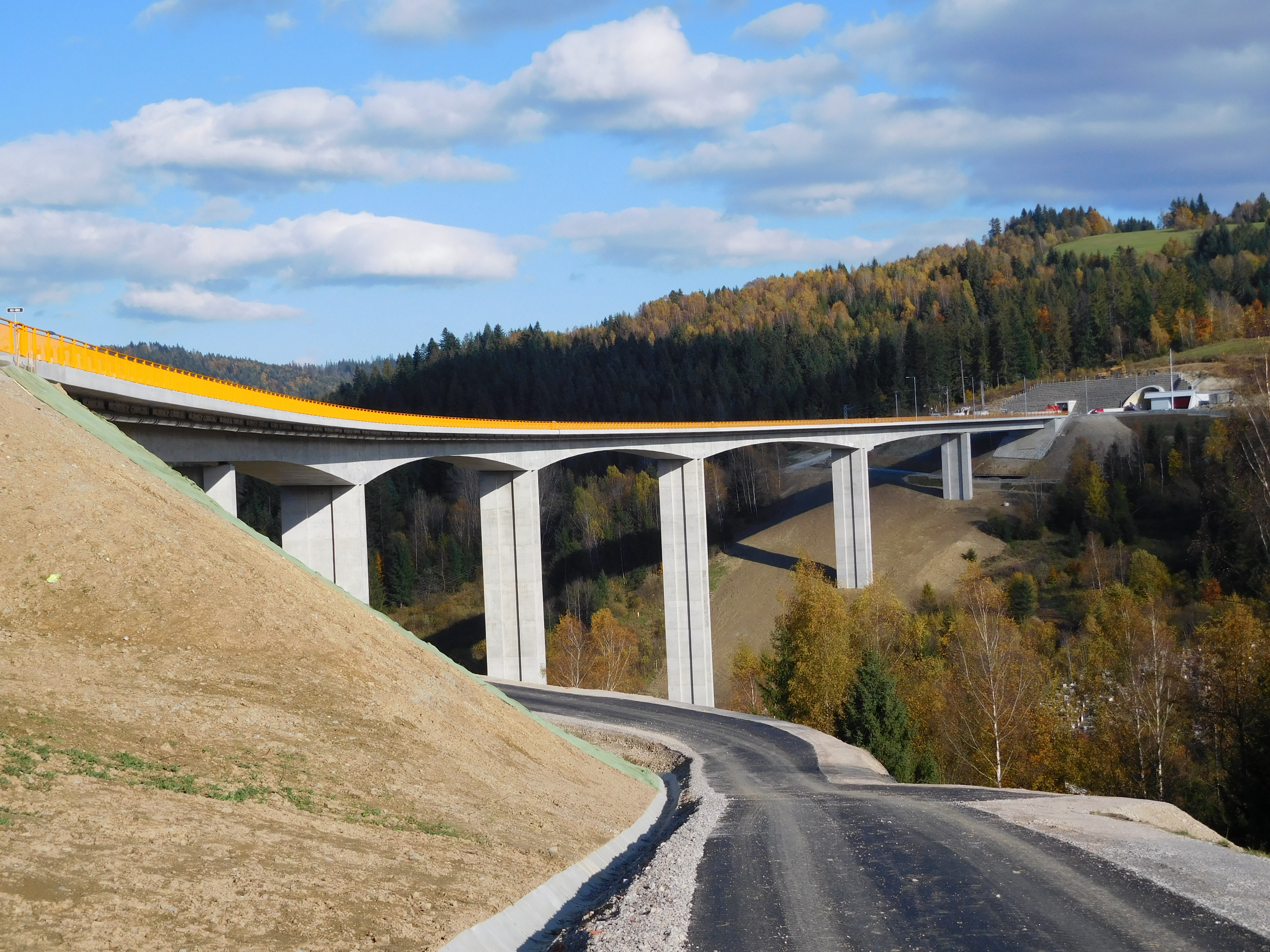
D3 in front of the western portal of the Poľana tunnel

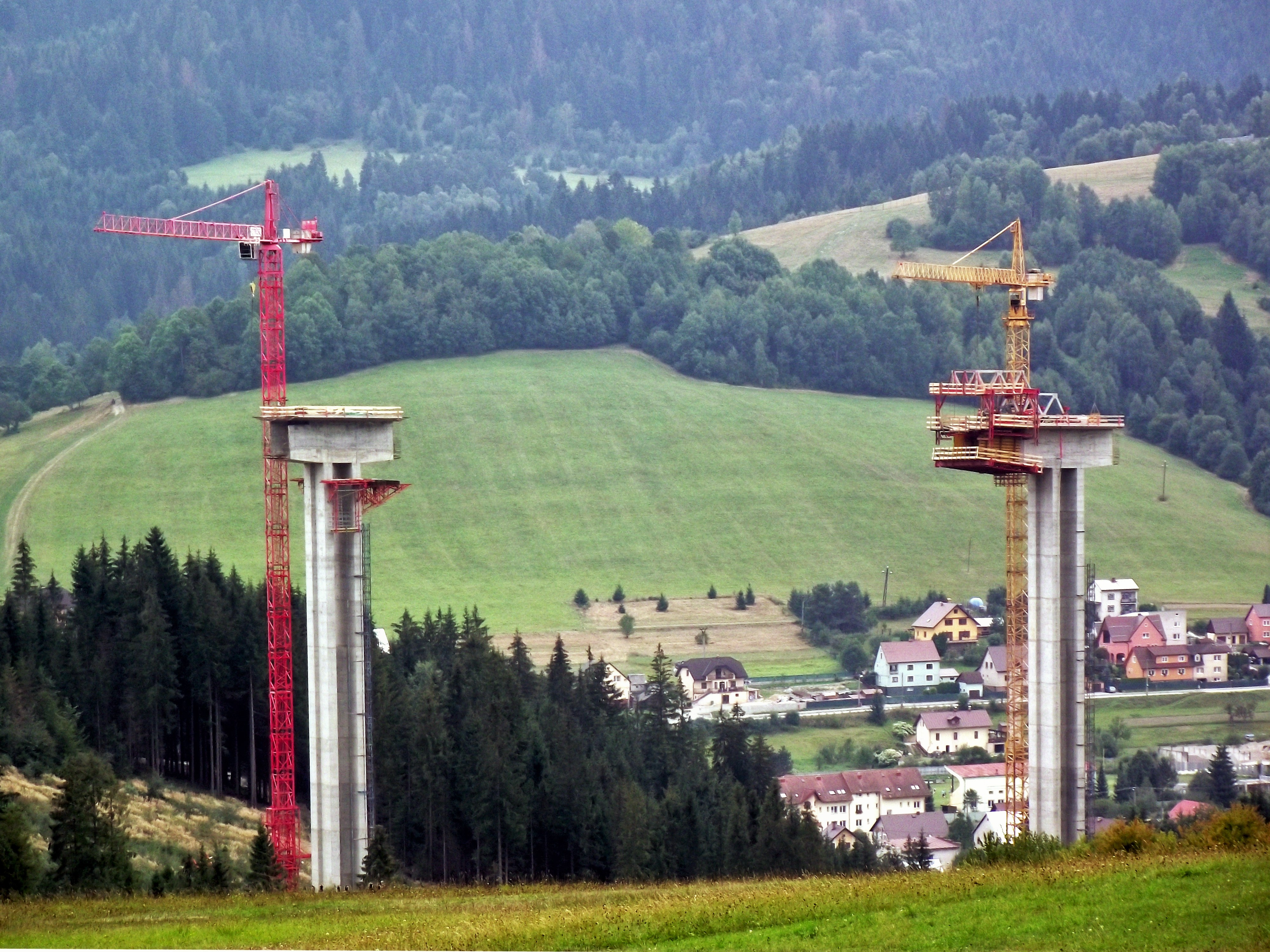
Construction of the Valy Bridge in September 2015, view from Hrčava

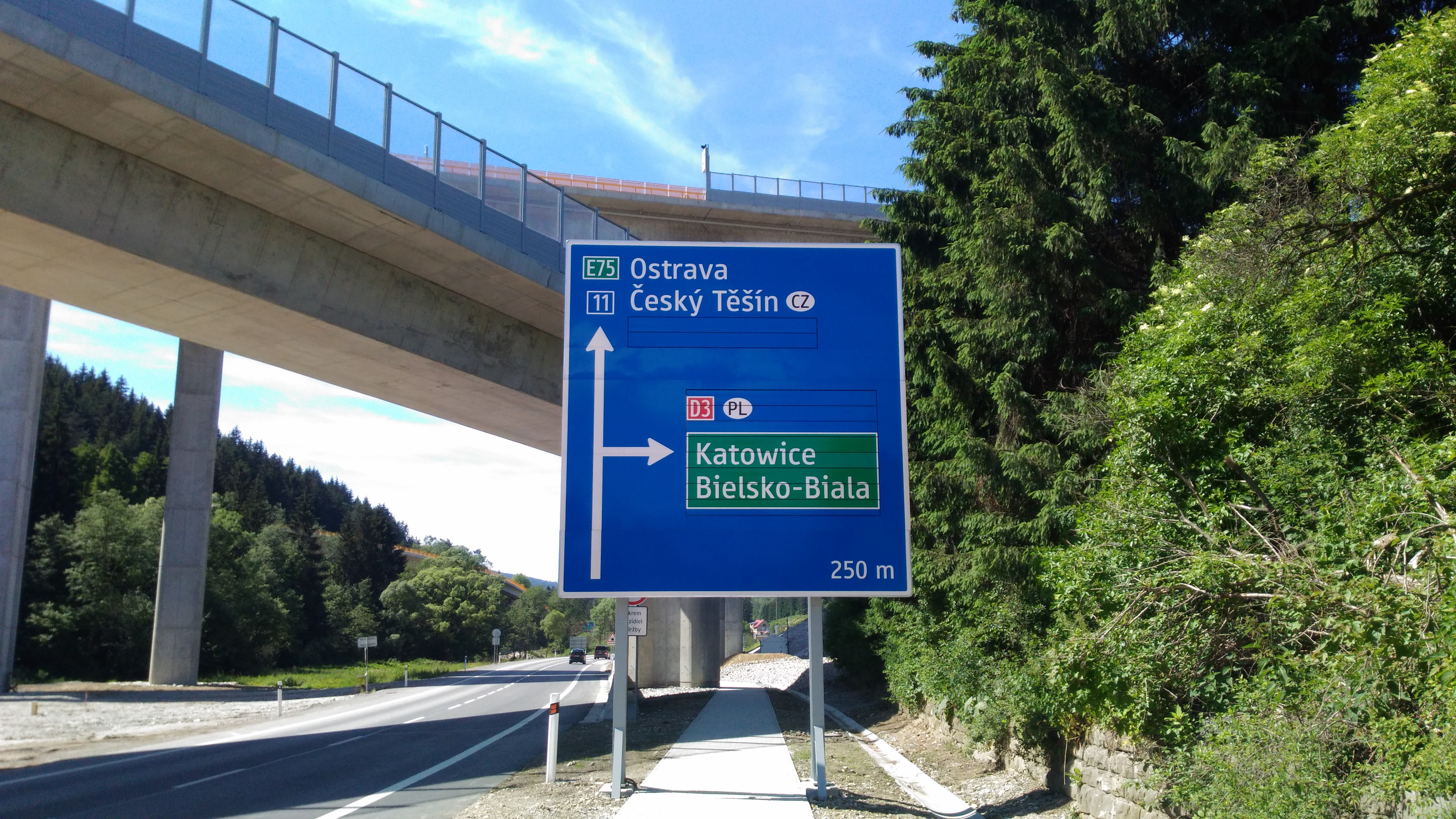
Sign signalling the connection to D3 (Svrčinovec)

== See also ==
- Highways in Slovakia
