= Czadeczka =

Czadeczka Slovak: Čadečka
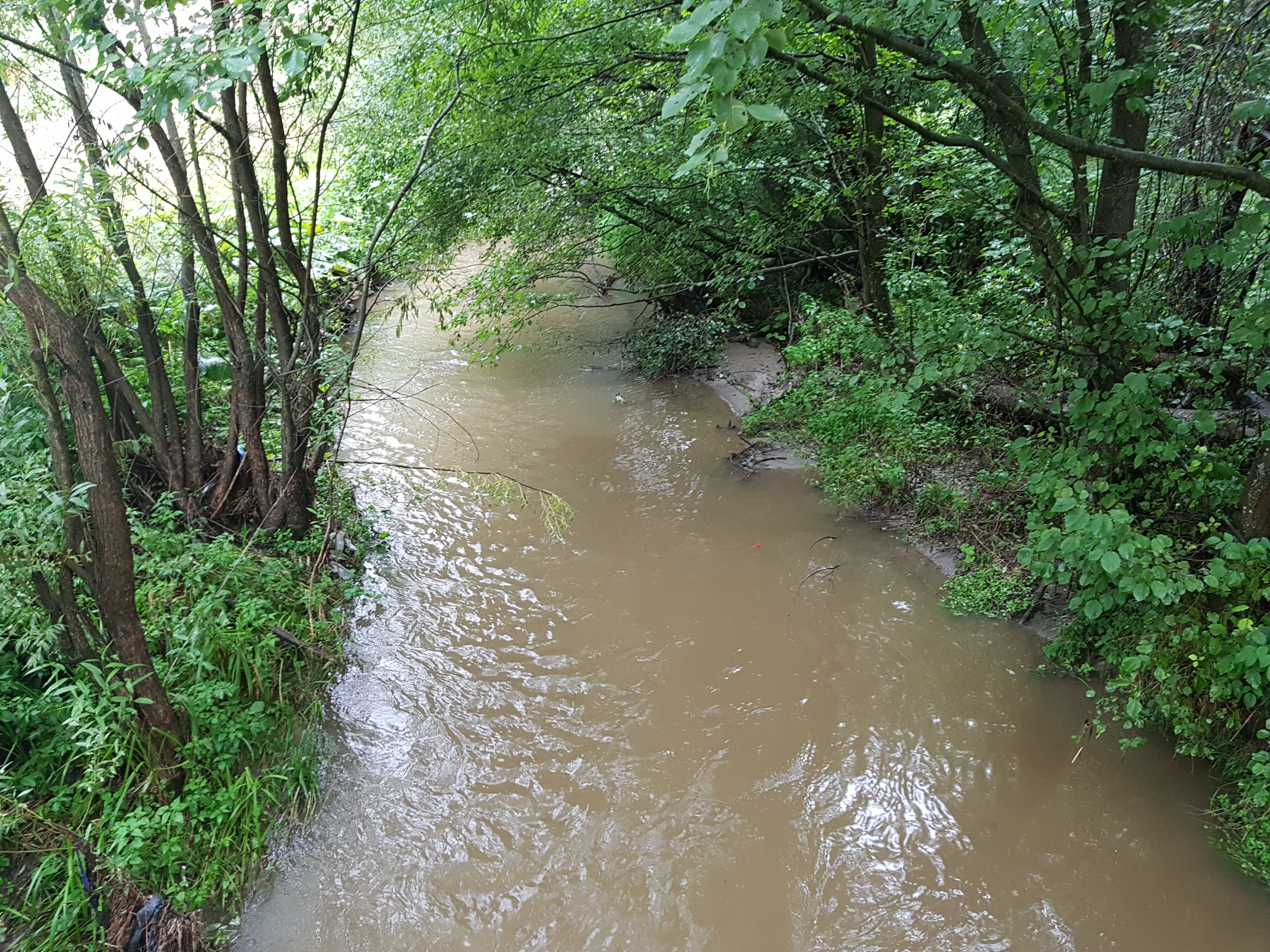

Location
- Country: Poland; Slovakia
- Regions: Silesian Voivodeship, Žilina Region

Physical characteristics
- Source
  - location: Southwestern slopes of Ochodzita, in the Silesian Beskids
  - elevation: 650 m (2,130 ft)
- Mouth: Čierňanka
  - location: Čierne
  - coordinates: 49°30′48″N 18°52′03″E
- Length: 10 km (6.2 mi)

Basin features
- Progression: Čierňanka→ Kysuca→ Váh→ Danube→ Black Sea

Czadeczka (Slovak: Čadečka) is a river of Poland and Slovakia. With its headwaters in the Silesian Beskids near the border with Slovakia, the Czadeczka crosses the border to join the Čierňanka near Skalité. The Čierňanka joins the Kysuca at Čadca.
