= D3 motorway =

D3 motorway may refer to:

- D3 motorway (Czech Republic)
- D3 motorway (Slovakia)
