= Čadca railway station =

Railway station in Čadca, Slovakia

Čadca
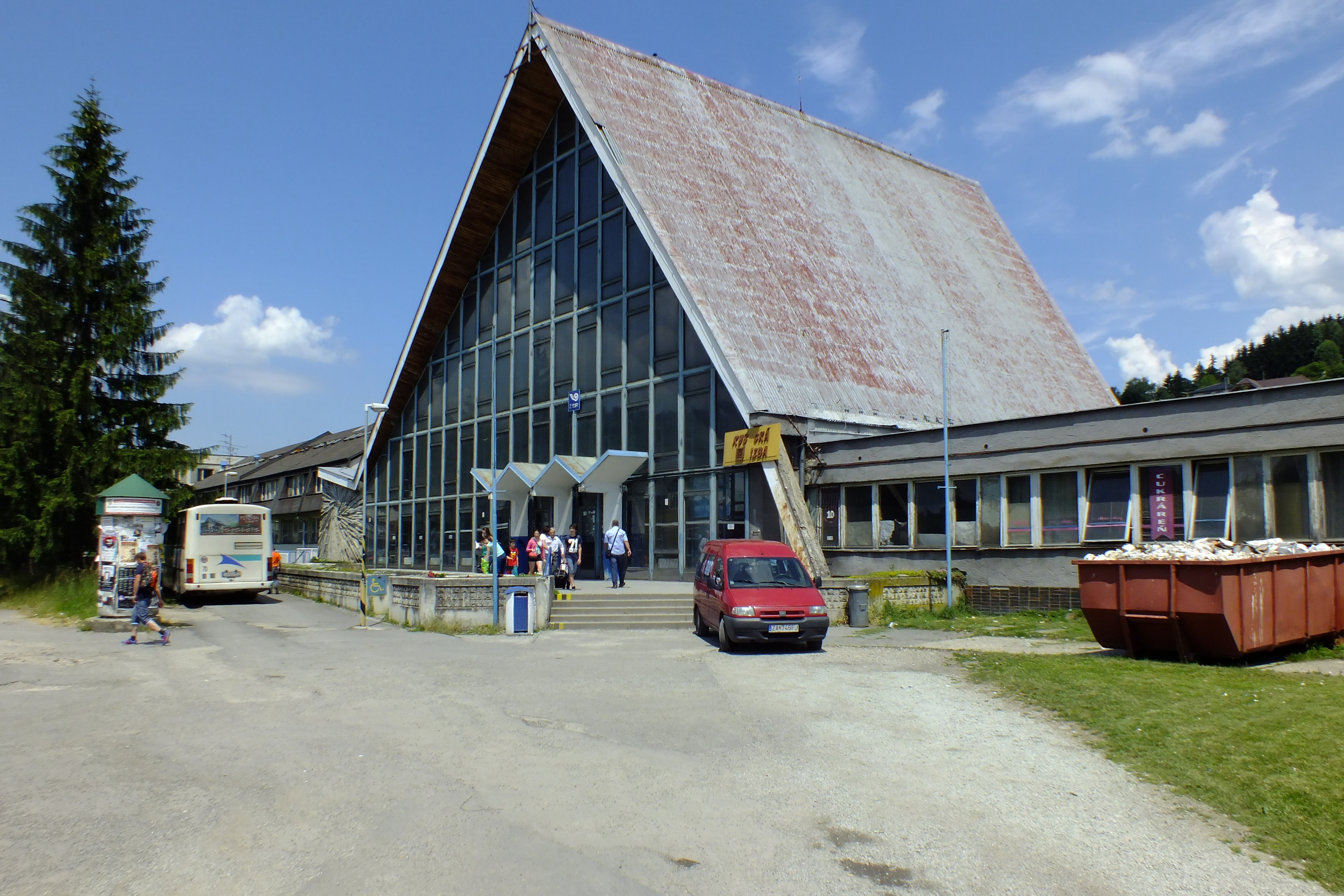
- Trains in the station yard, 2009

General information
- Location: Staničná, 02201 Čadca; Slovakia
- Coordinates: 49°26′40″N 18°47′13″E
- Owner: Železnice Slovenskej republiky
- Operator: Železnice Slovenskej republiky
- Lines: Žilina–Čadca–Svrčinovec zastávka–Mosty u Jablunkova (ČD); Čadca–Makov; Čadca–Skalité Serafínov–Zwardoň (PKP)
- Connections: Local buses

History
- Opened: 8 January 1871
Location
- Location within Slovakia

Čadca railway station (Slovak: Železničná stanica Čadca) is the main station serving the municipality and district town of Čadca, in the Žilina Region, northern Slovakia. Opened in 1871, the station forms part of the cross border Žilina–Čadca–Svrčinovec zastávka–Mosty u Jablunkova railway, and is also a junction station for two other lines, one of them also cross border.

The station is currently owned by Železnice Slovenskej republiky (ŽSR); train services are operated by Železničná spoločnosť Slovensko (ZSSK).

== Location ==
Čadca railway station is situated on Staničná street, a short distance to the north of, and across the river from, the town centre.

== History ==
The station was opened on 8 January 1871, upon the inauguration of the Český Těšín–Žilina section of the Košice–Bohumín Railway.

== Facilities ==
Due to its original architecture, the station building has been nicknamed Chata ("the chalet") by locals. It houses ticketing facilities and a restaurant.

== Train services ==
Čadca railway station is the junction of the following Slovak railway lines:

- 127 Žilina–Čadca–Svrčinovec zastávka–Mosty u Jablunkova (ČD) (part of the Košice–Bohumín Railway)
- 128 Čadca–Makov
- 129 Čadca–Skalité Serafínov–Zwardoň (PKP)

As it is close to the Czech Republic and Poland, the station offers services to several destinations in these countries. For the Czech Republic, there are many trains to Ostrava, Bohumín and Prague, and to Poland, there are trains towards the border crossing at Skalité/Zwardoń.

== Interchange ==
The station offers interchange with local buses.

== Services ==
Preceding station	ŽSSK	Following station
Třinec (Czech Republic) toward Ostrava	Regional fast trains	Žilina toward Košice
Svrčinovec zastávka toward Ostrava	Stopping trains	Terminus
Svrčinovec toward Skalité	Stopping trains	Čadca mesto toward Žilina
Čadca zastávka toward Makov	Stopping trains	Terminus
Preceding station	RegioJet	Following station
Třinec (Czech Republic) toward Praha hl.n.	IC RegioJet	Kysucké Nové Mesto toward Žilina

== See also ==
- History of rail transport in Slovakia
- Rail transport in Slovakia
