= European route E75 =

Road in trans-European E-road network

E75

Route information
- Length: 4,380 km (2,720 mi)

Major junctions
- North end: Vardø, Norway
- South end: Sitia, Greece

Location
- Countries: Norway; Finland; Poland; Czech Republic; Slovakia; Hungary; Serbia; North Macedonia; Greece

Highway system
- International E-road network; A Class; B Class

European route E 75 is part of the International E-road network, which is a series of main roads in Europe.

The E 75 starts at the town of Vardø in Norway by the Barents Sea, and it runs south through Finland, Poland, Czech Republic, Slovakia, Hungary, Serbia, North Macedonia, and Greece. The road ends after about 4,380 kilometres (2,720 mi) (not counting ferries) at the town of Sitia on the eastern end of the island of Crete in the Mediterranean Sea, it being the most southerly point reached by an E-road. (The northernmost one is the E69.)

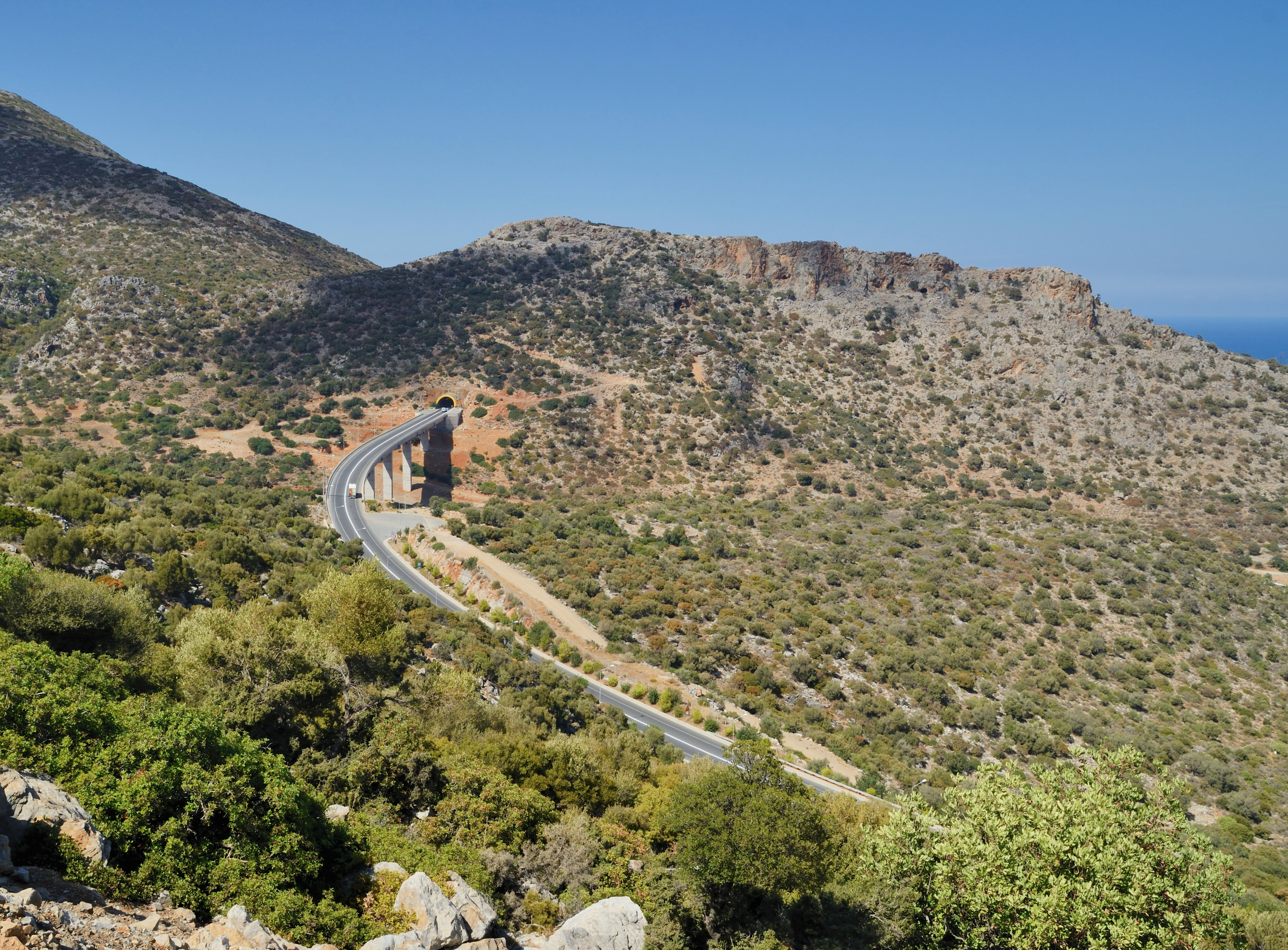
European route E75, Crete

From the beginning of the 1990s until 2009, there was no ferry connection between Helsinki and Gdańsk. However, Finnlines started a regular service between Helsinki and Gdynia. It is also possible to take a ferry from Helsinki to Tallinn and drive along the E67 from Tallinn to Piotrków Trybunalski in Poland and then continue with the E75.

== Settlements ==
Major towns and cities on the E75 are:

- Vardø
- Vadsø
- Nesseby
- Varangerbotn
- Tana bru
- Utsjoki
- Inari
- Ivalo
- Sodankylä
- Rovaniemi
- Kemi
- Oulu
- Jyväskylä
- Heinola
- Lahti
- Helsinki … Gdynia
- Gdańsk
- Toruń
- Włocławek
- Łódź
- Piotrków Trybunalski
- Częstochowa
- Katowice
- Bielsko-Biała
- Žilina
- Bratislava
- Győr
- Budapest
- Kecskemét
- Szeged
- Subotica
- Novi Sad
- Belgrade
- Niš
- Leskovac
- Vranje
- Kumanovo
- Skopje
- Veles
- Gevgelija
- Thessaloniki
- Larissa
- Katerini
- Lamia
- Athens … Chania
- Iraklion
- Agios Nikolaos
- Sitia

== Route ==
=== Norway ===
  - E75: Vardø – Varangerbotn (Start of Concurrency with E6) – Utsjoki (End of Concurrency with E6)

=== Finland ===
  - Vt 4: Utsjoki – Ivalo – Sodankylä ( E63) – Rovaniemi – Kemi ( E8) – Oulu ( E8) – Jyväskylä ( E63) – Lahti – Helsinki ( E18)
  - Vt 3 / Vt 4 / Vt 7: Helsinki ( E12)
- : (Finland) Helsinki – (Poland) Gdynia

No ferry to Gdynia. Closest alternative is Helsinki - Gdańsk

=== Poland ===
  - DK 91: Gdańsk ( E77)
  - S 7: Gdańsk ( E28 E77)
  - S 6: Gdańsk ( E28) – Pruszcz Gdański
  - A 1: Pruszcz Gdański – Grudziądz ( E261) – Toruń – Łódź ( E30) – Piotrków Trybunalski ( E67) – Częstochowa – Pyrzowice
  - S 1: Pyrzowice – Podwarpie
  - DK 1: Podwarpie – Dąbrowa Górnicza
  - S 1: Dąbrowa Górnicza – Mysłowice ( E40, Start of Concurrency with E462) – Tychy
  - DK 1: Tychy – Bielsko-Biała
  - S 52: Bielsko-Biała – Cieszyn

=== Czech Republic ===
  - D48: Český Těšín (Start of Concurrency with E462)
  - I/11: Český Těšín (End of Concurrency with E462) - Mosty u Jablunkova

=== Slovakia ===
  - D3: Svrčinovec - Čadca
  - I/11: Čadca - Žilina
  - D3: Žilina
  - D1: Žilina ( E442, Start of Concurrency with E50) - Trenčín ( E572, End of Concurrency with E50) - Trnava (Start of concurrency with E58) - Bratislava
  - D4: Bratislava ring road ( E58)
  - D2: Bratislava (Start of Concurrency with E65, End of Concurrency with E58)

=== Hungary ===
  - M15: Rajka - Mosonmagyaróvár ( E60)
  - M1: Mosonmagyaróvár (Start of Concurrency with E60, End of Concurrency with E65) - Budapest
  - M0: Budapest ( E71 E73)
  - M5: Budapest - Újhartyán (End of Concurrency with E60) - Kecskemét - Szeged

=== Serbia ===
  - A1: Horgoš - Subotica ( E662) - Novi Sad - Belgrade ( E70 E763) - Paraćin ( E761) - Niš ( E80 E771) - Preševo

=== North Macedonia ===
  - A-1: Tabanovce - Kumanovo ( E871) - Petrovec (Towards E65 and Skopje) - Gevgelija

=== Greece ===
  - A1: Evzonoi – Katerini – Thessaloniki – Larissa – Lamia – Athens
  - Athens – Chania
  - A90 / EO90: Chania – Rethymno – Heraklion – Agios Nikolaos

The E75 in Greece currently runs from Evzonoi in the north to Sitia in the south, via Thessaloniki (branch from Chalastra), Larissa, Almyros, Lamia, Athens, Chania, Heraklion and Agios Nikolaos: the section between Piraeus (southwest of Athens) and Chania is a ferry.

In relation to the national road network, the E75 currently follows (in order, from north to south):

- The A1 motorway, from Evzonoi to Chalastra
- The A1 and A2 motorways, from Kleidi to Thessaloniki (branch), via Chalastra
- The A1 motorway, from Kleidi to Piraeus
- The A90 motorway and EO90 road, from Chania to Sitia

The E75 runs concurrently with the E65 between Roditsa and Bralos, the E90 between Kalochori and Kleidi (via Chalastra), and the E92 between Larissa and Velestino. The E75 also connects with the southern end of the E65 at Chania, the E79 at Thessaloniki, the E86 at Gefyra, the E94 at Metamorfosi, and the northern end of the E962 at Thebes.

== Gallery ==
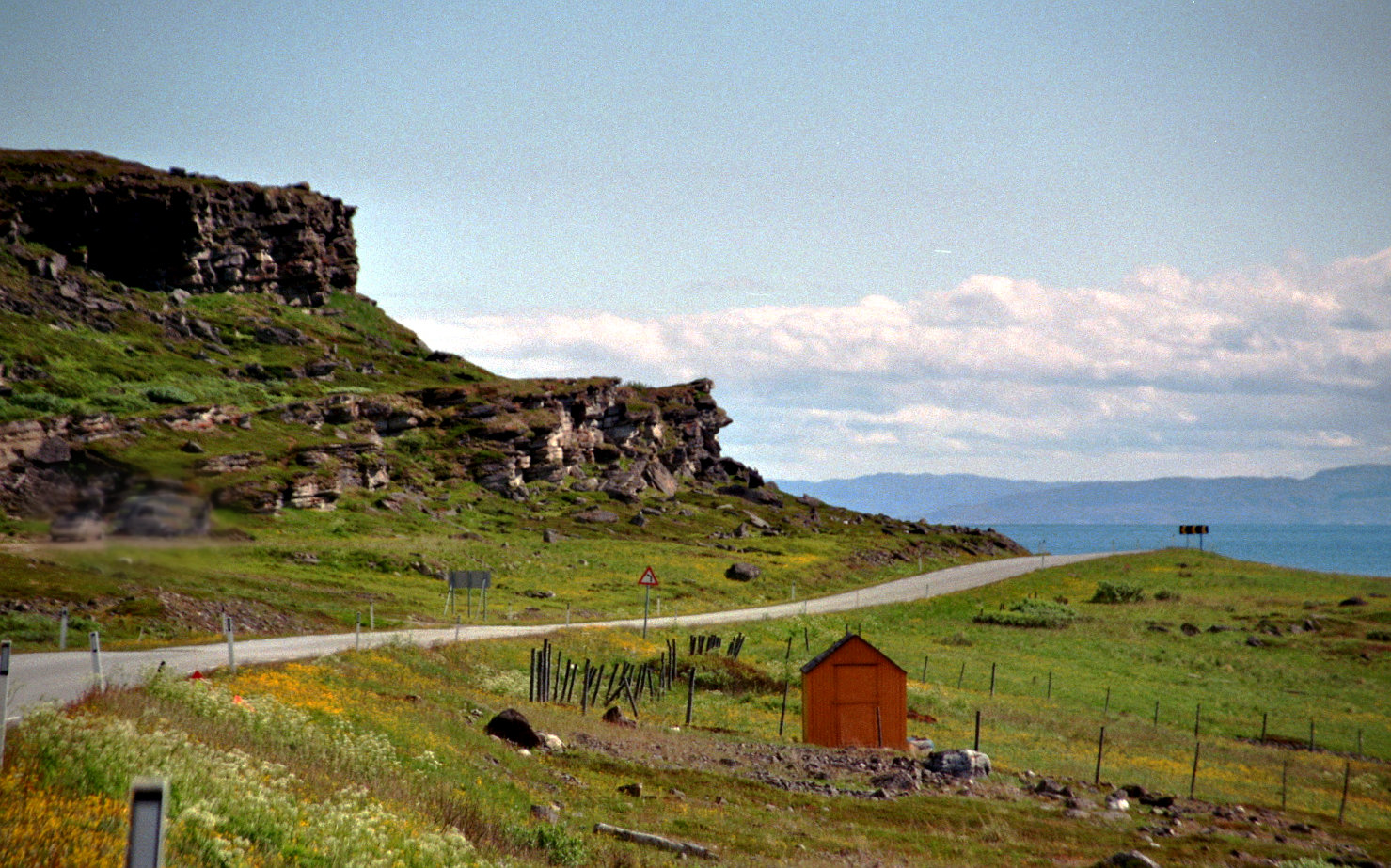
The E 75 near Vadsø, Norway

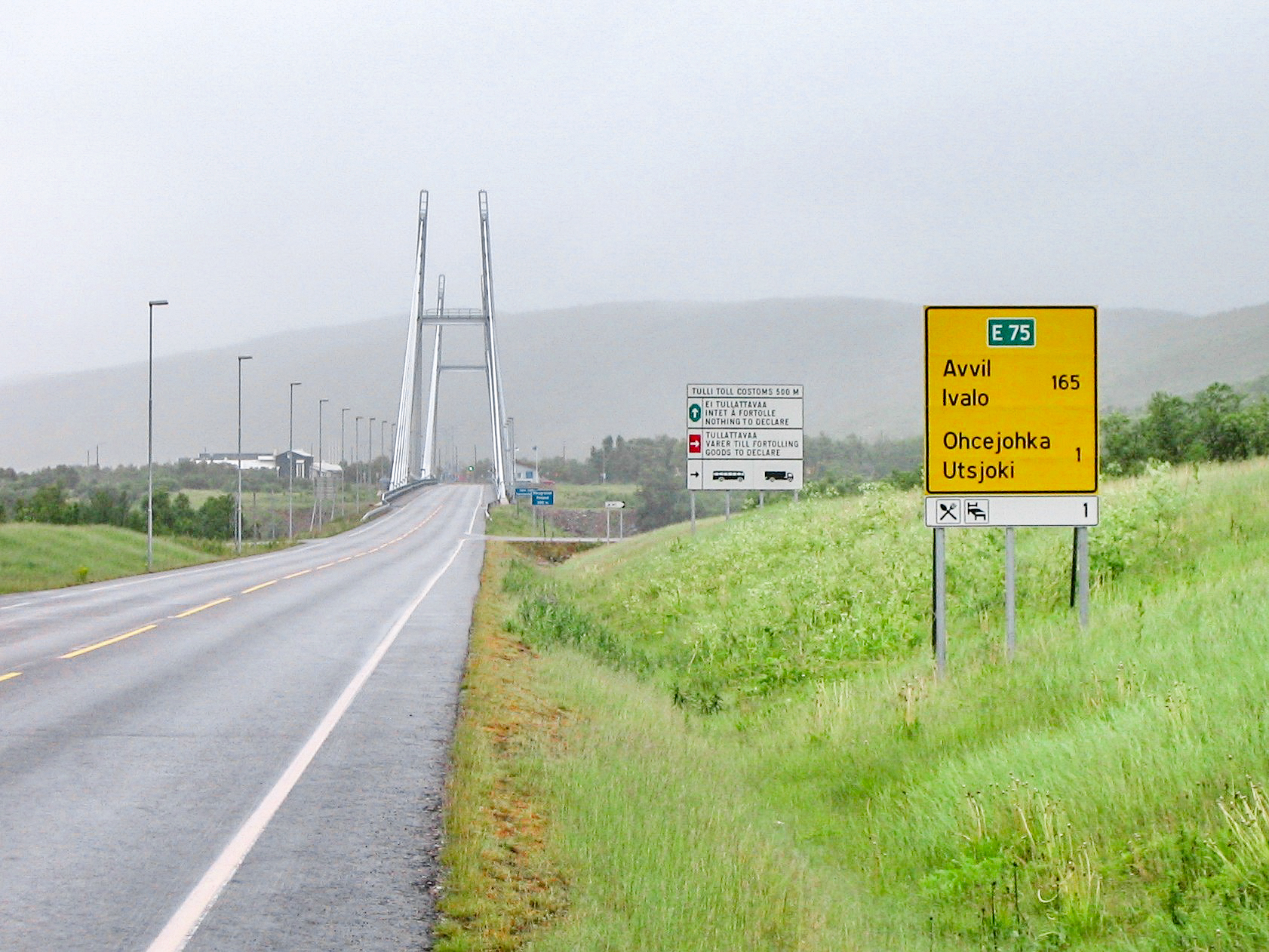
The E 75 on the Norwegian–Finnish border

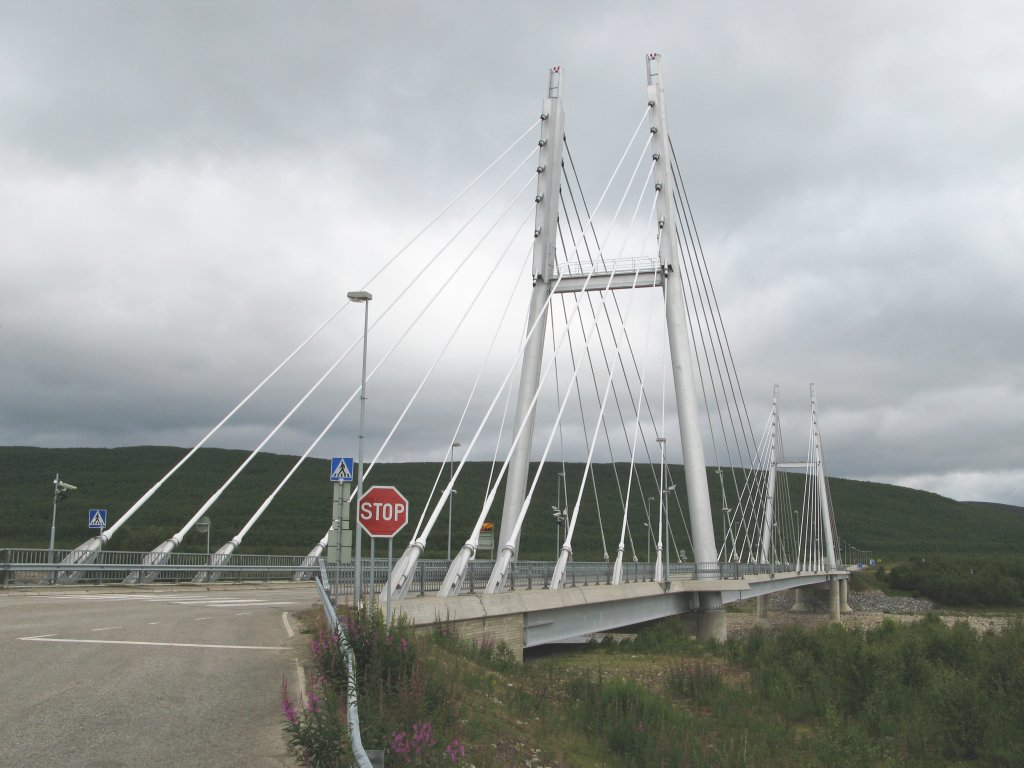
The E 75, the Sami Bridge on the Norwegian–Finnish border in the Utsjoki village

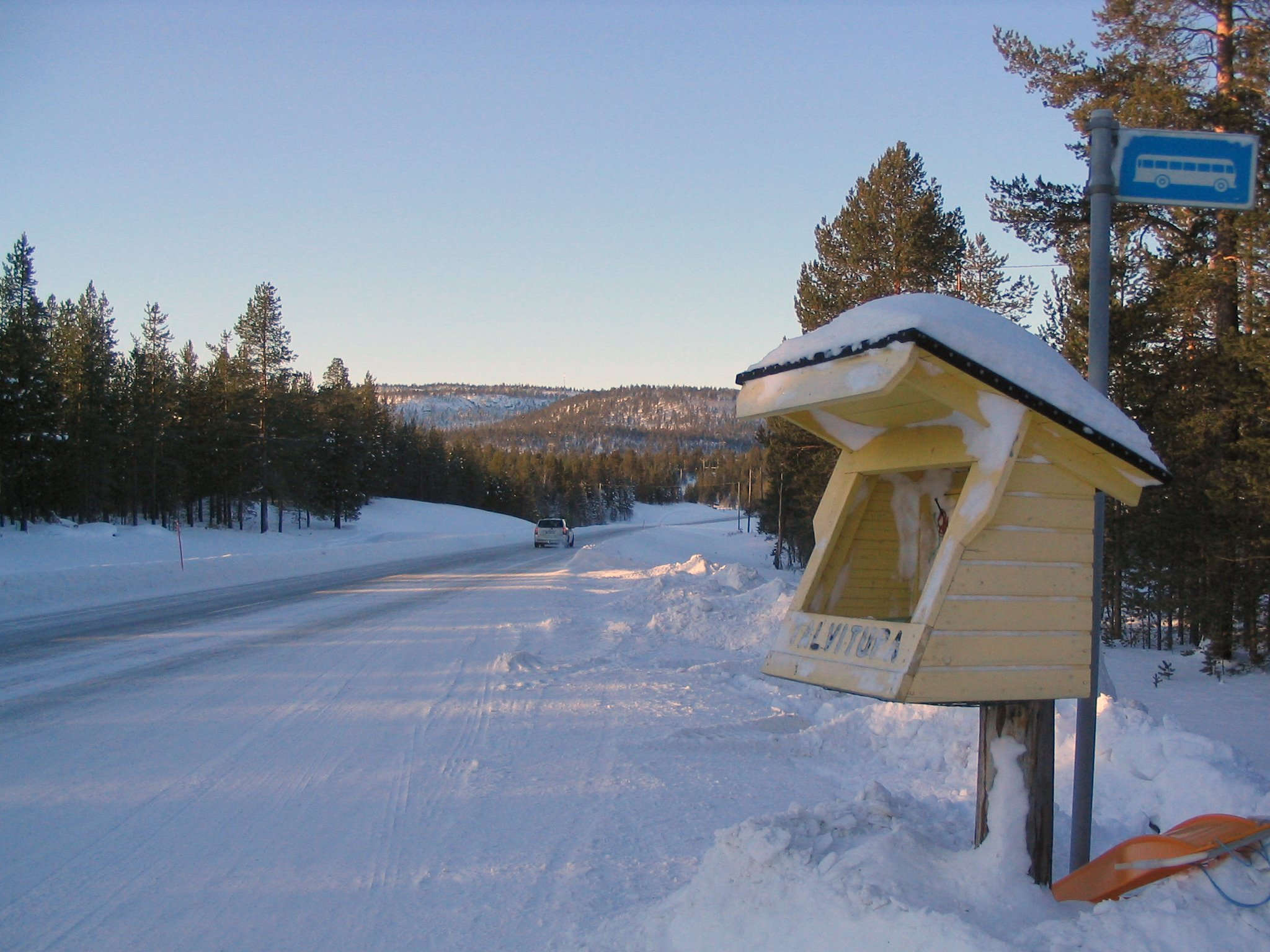
The E 75 in winter in Inari, Finland

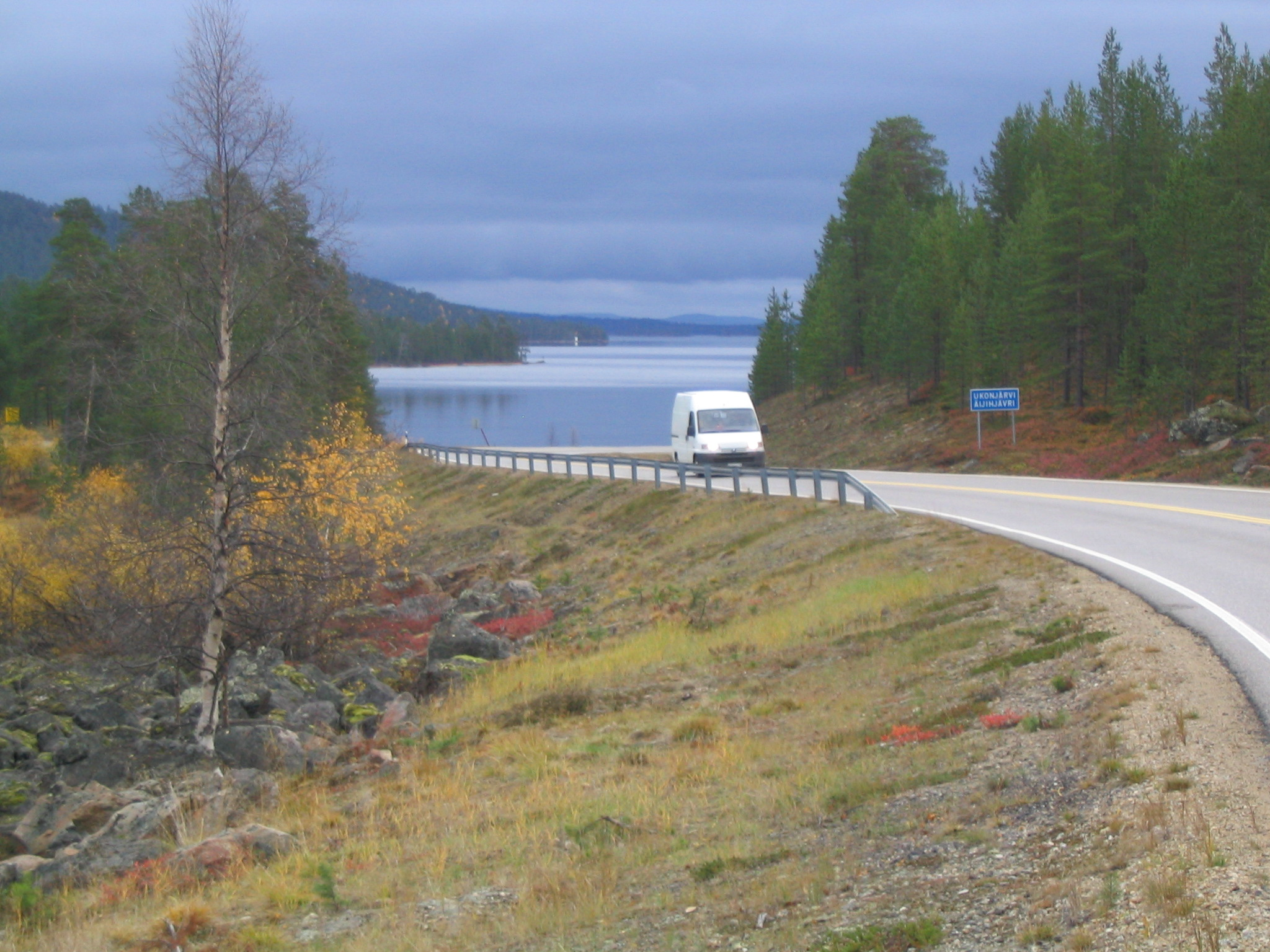
The E 75 in Ukonjärvi, Inari, Finland

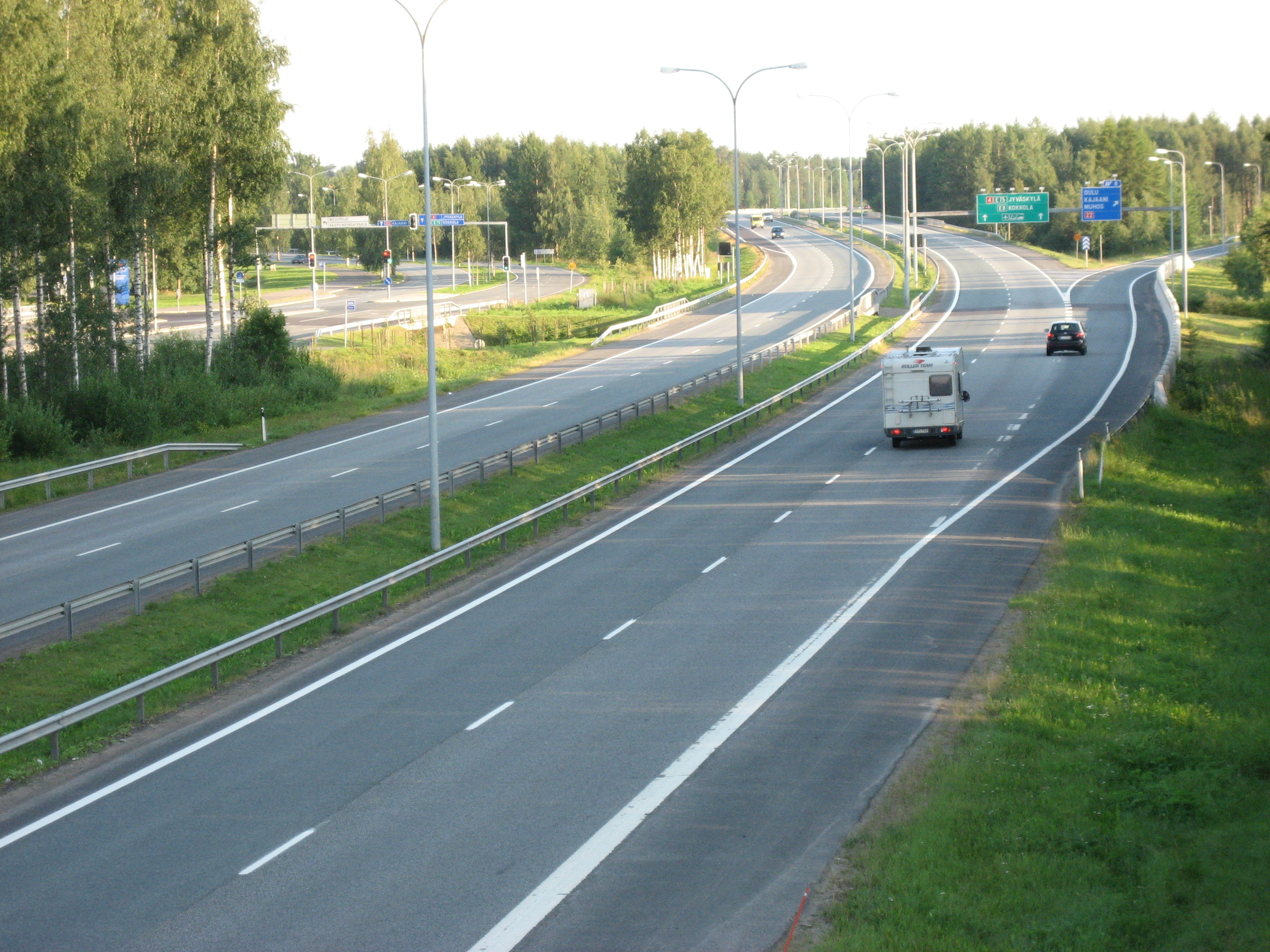
The E 75 in Oulu, Finland

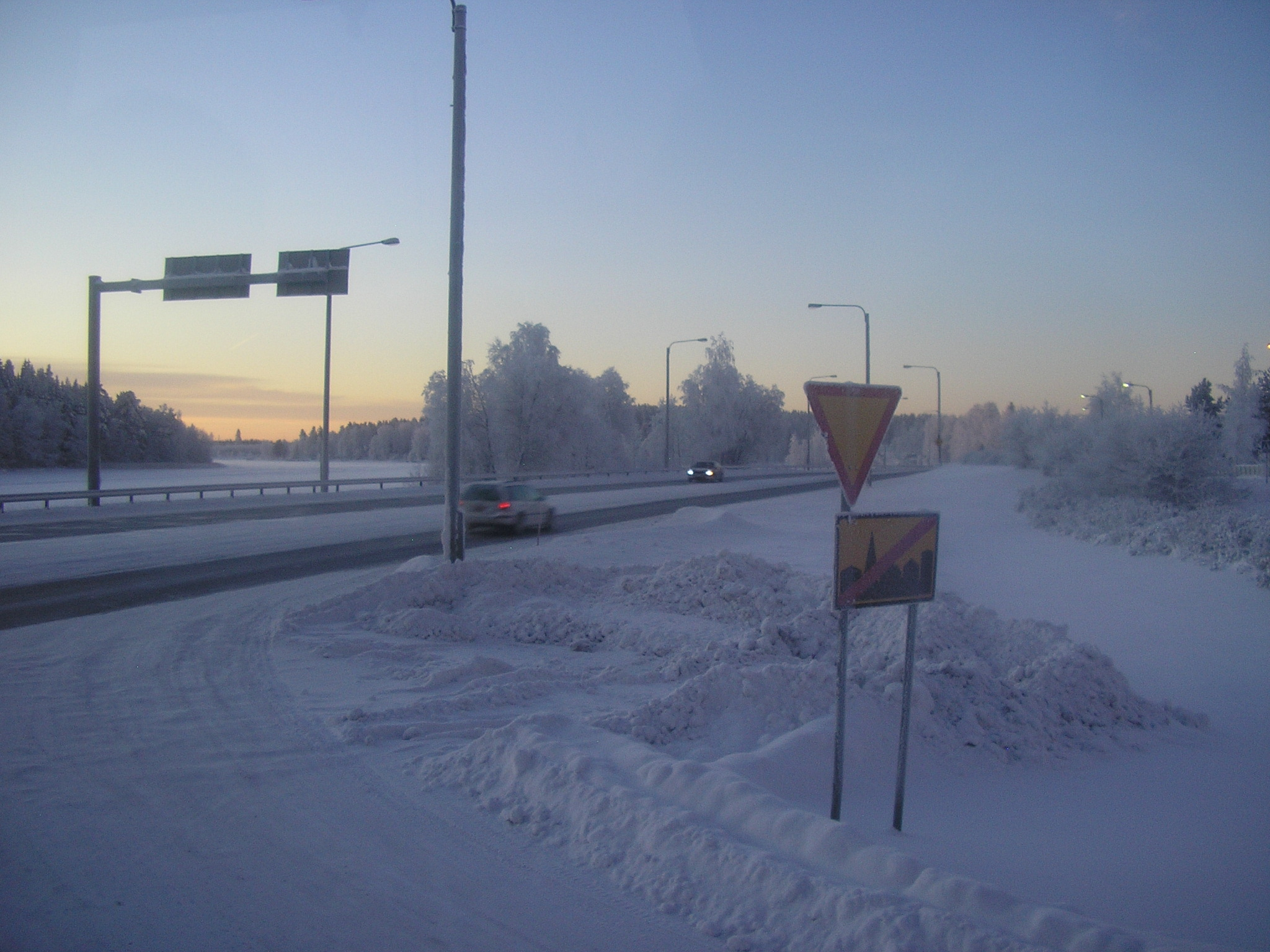
The E 75 in Viitasaari, Central Finland

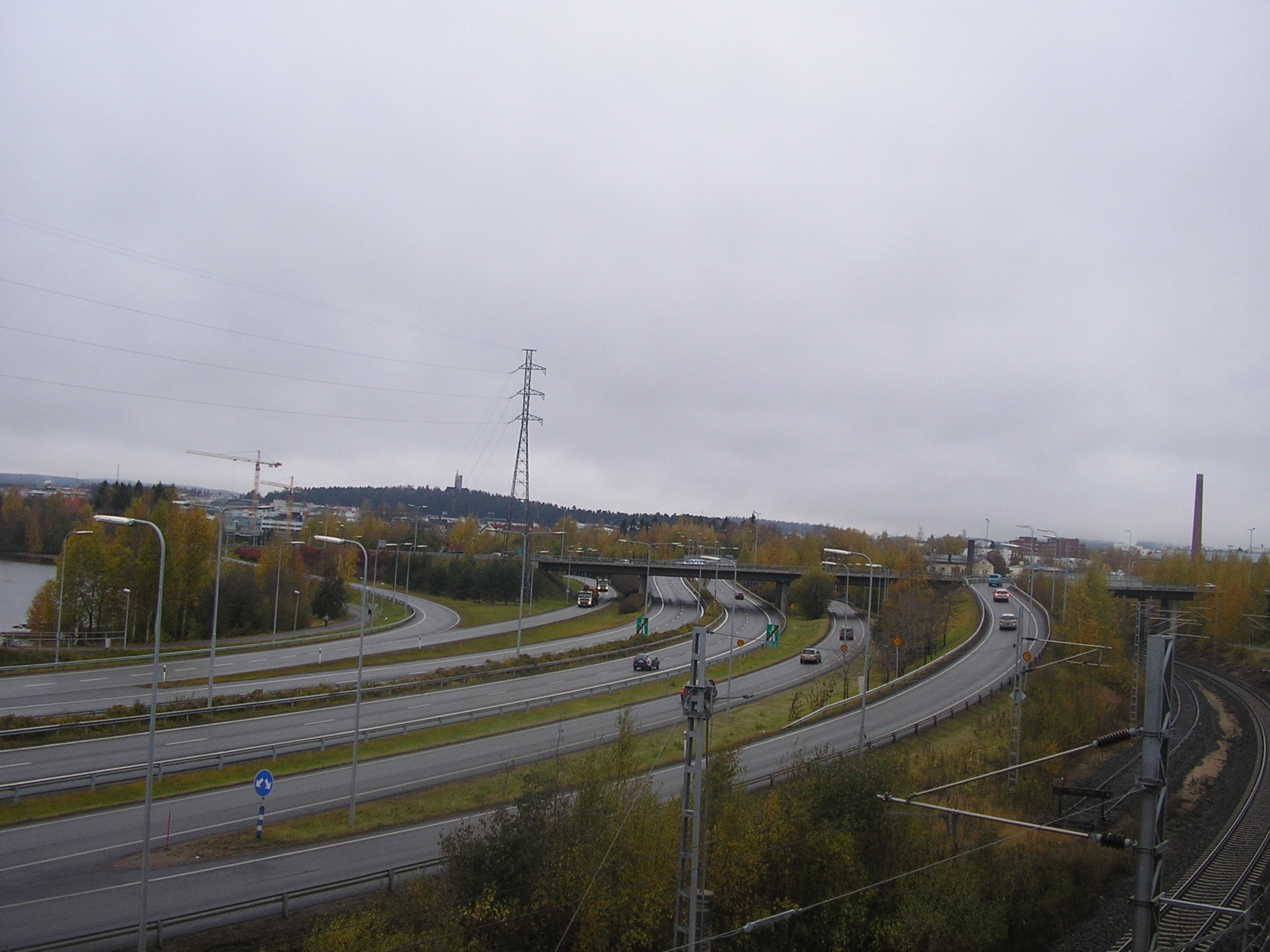
The E 75 near Jyväskylä, Finland

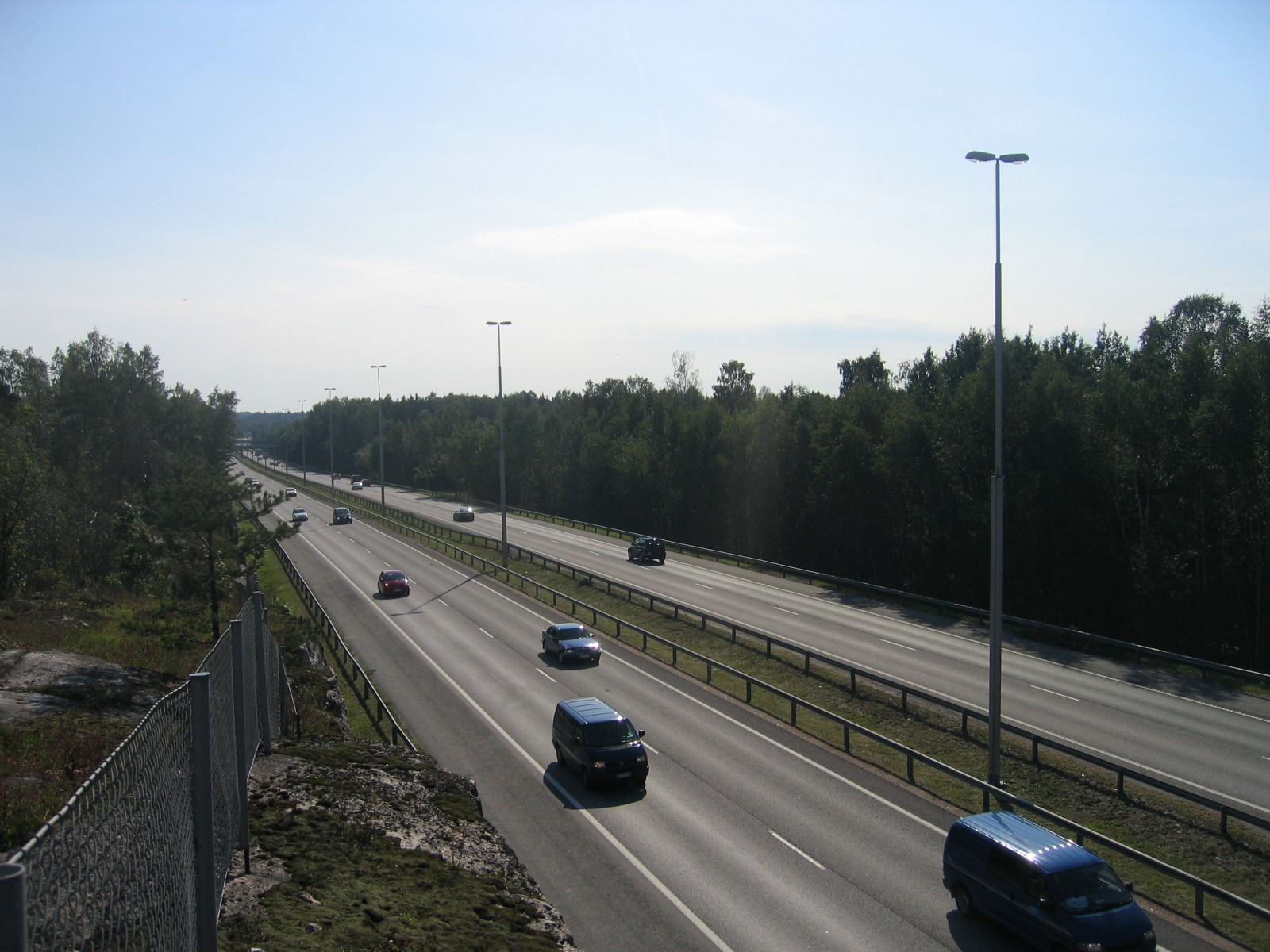
The E 75 in Jakomäki, near Helsinki, Finland

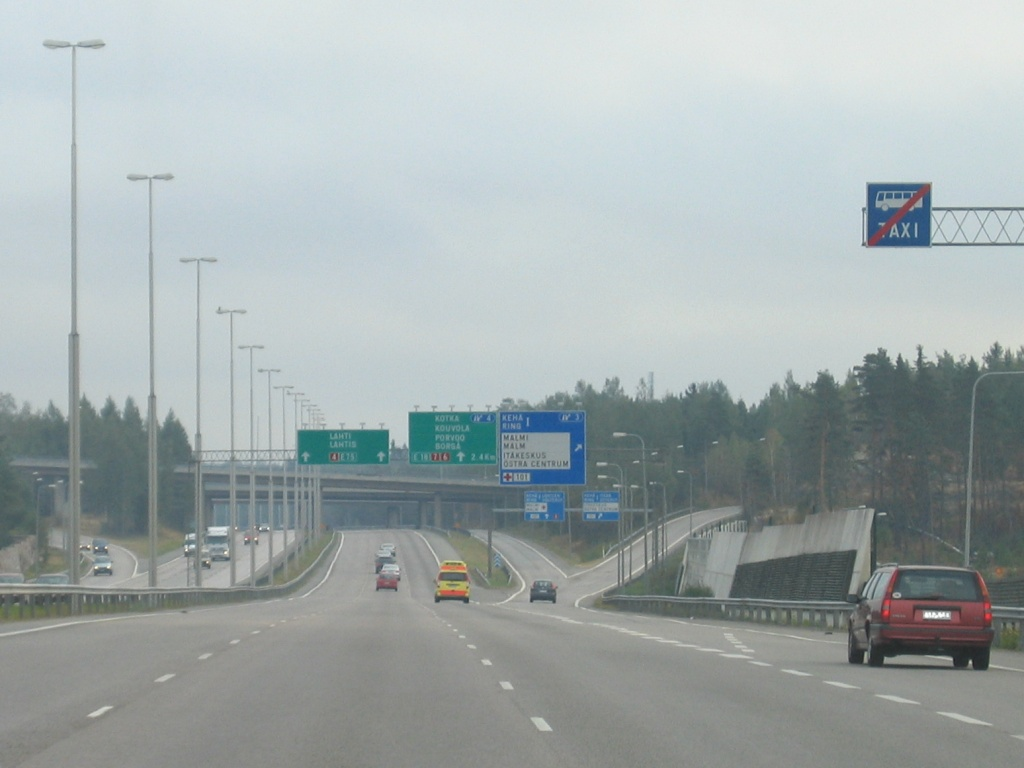
The E 75 near Helsinki, Finland

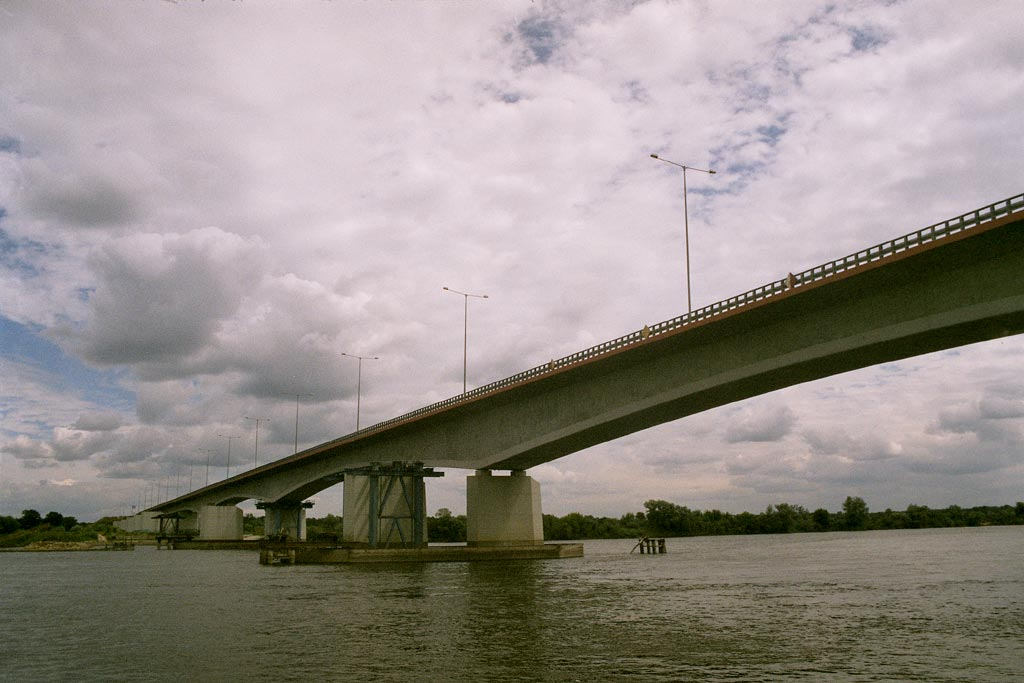
The E 75 crossing the Vistula near Toruń, Poland

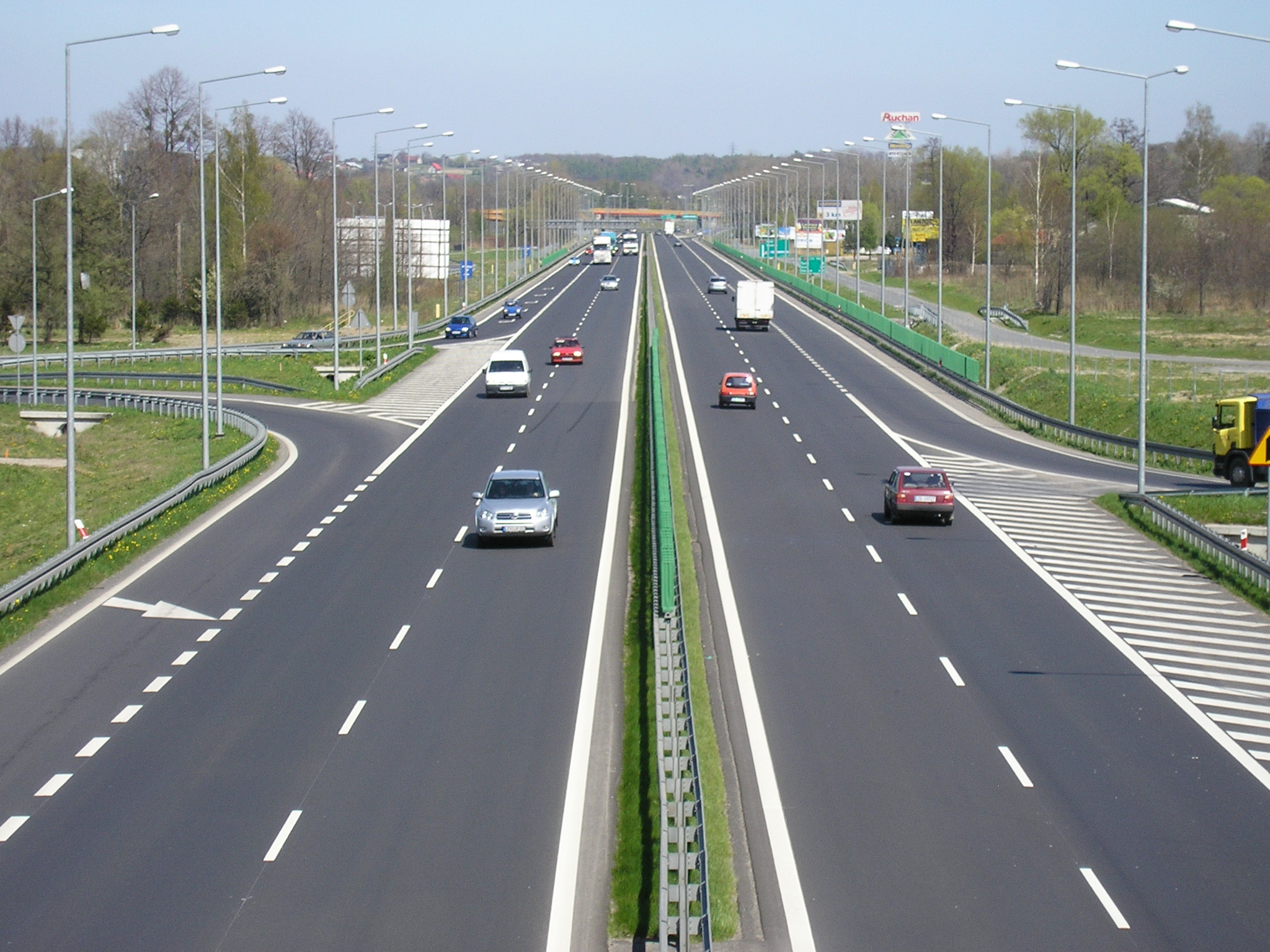
The E 75 in Bielsko-Biała, Poland

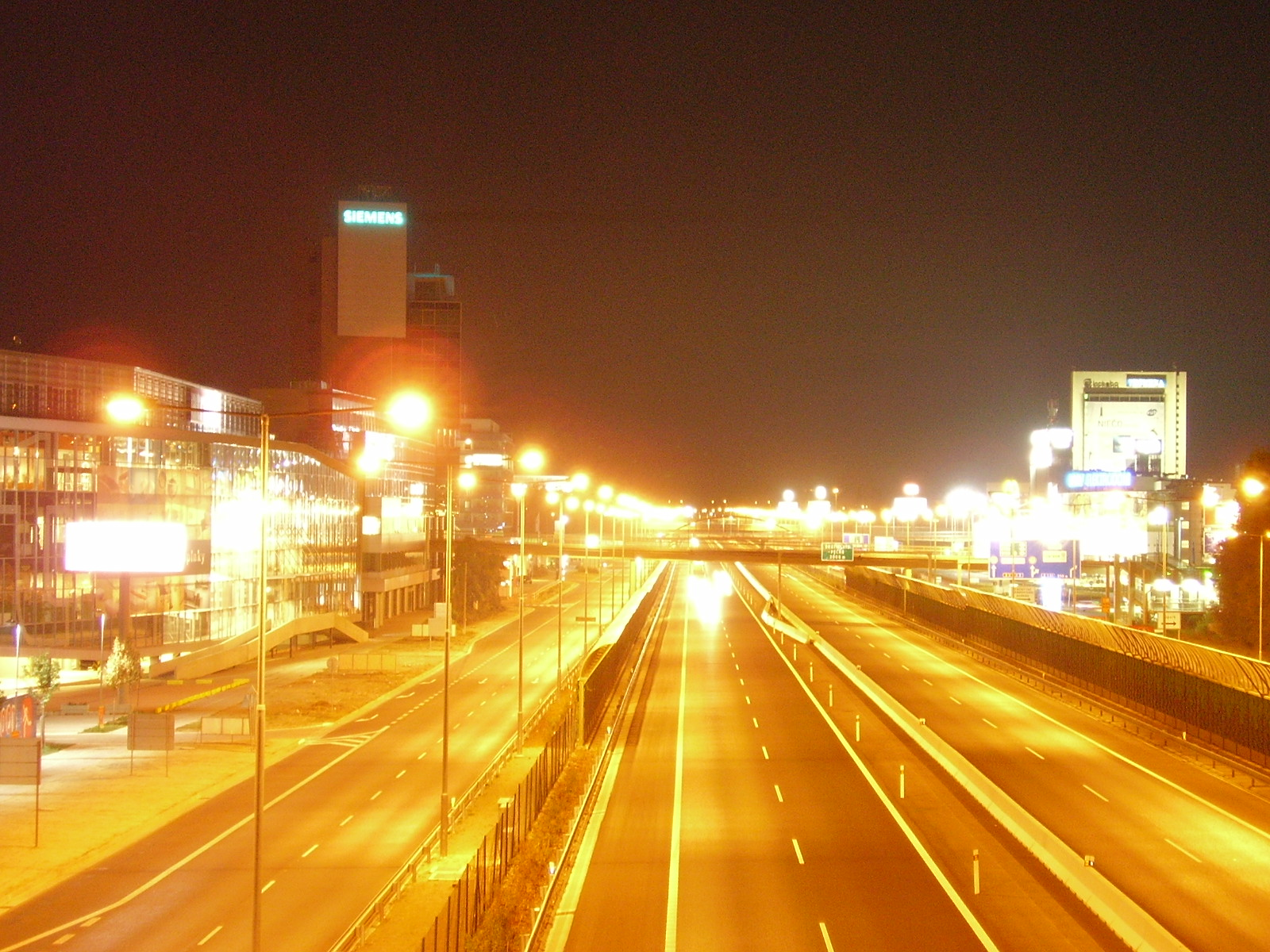
The E 75/D1 in Bratislava, Slovakia

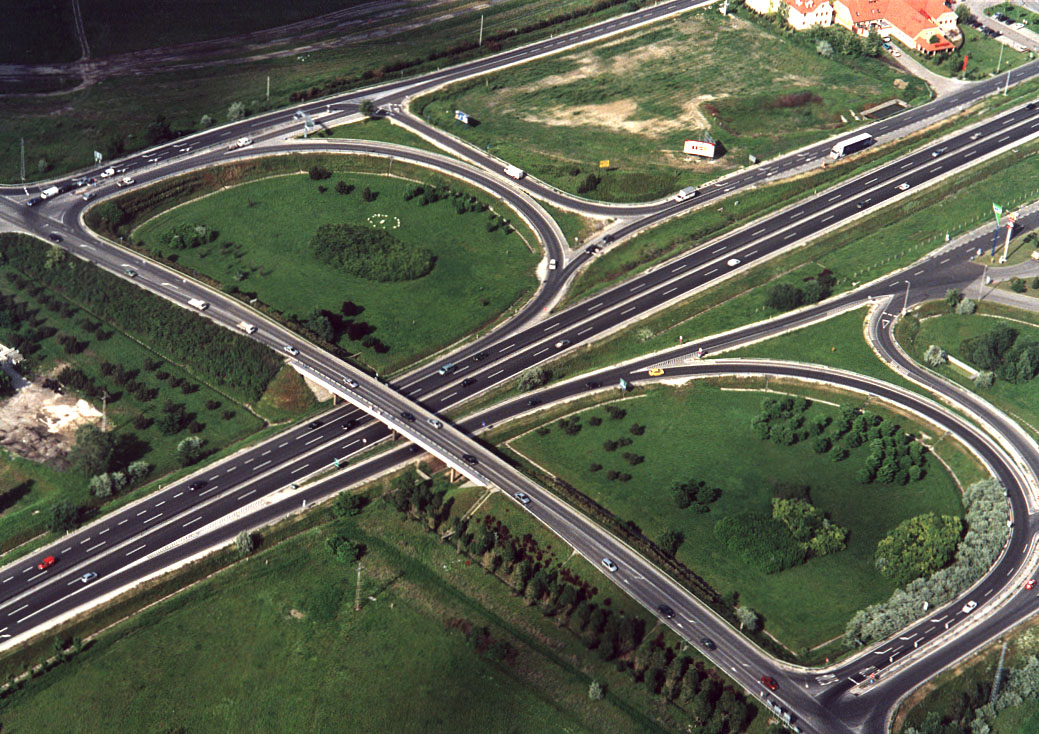
The E 75/M5 in Hungary

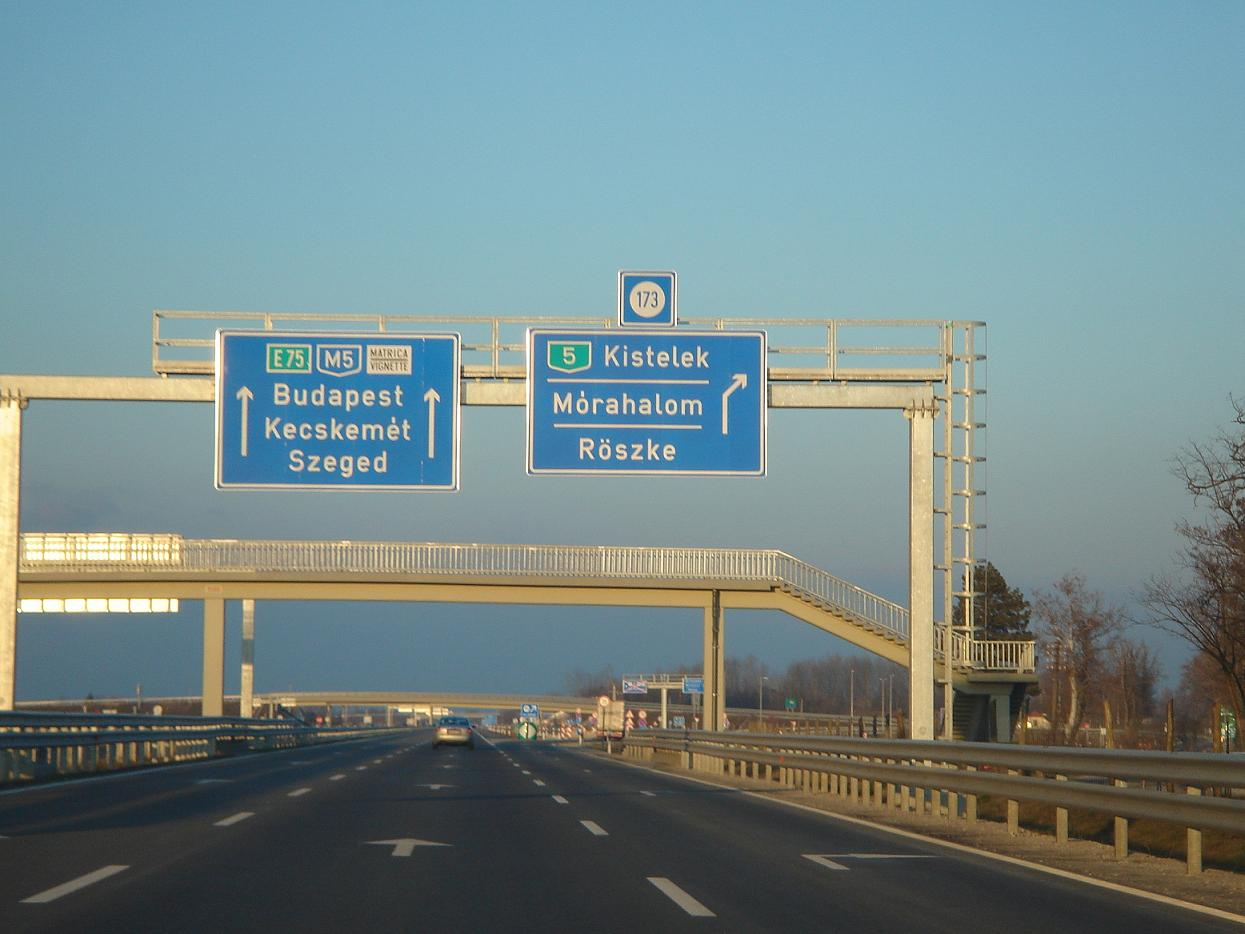
The E 75 in Röszke, Hungarian border with Serbia

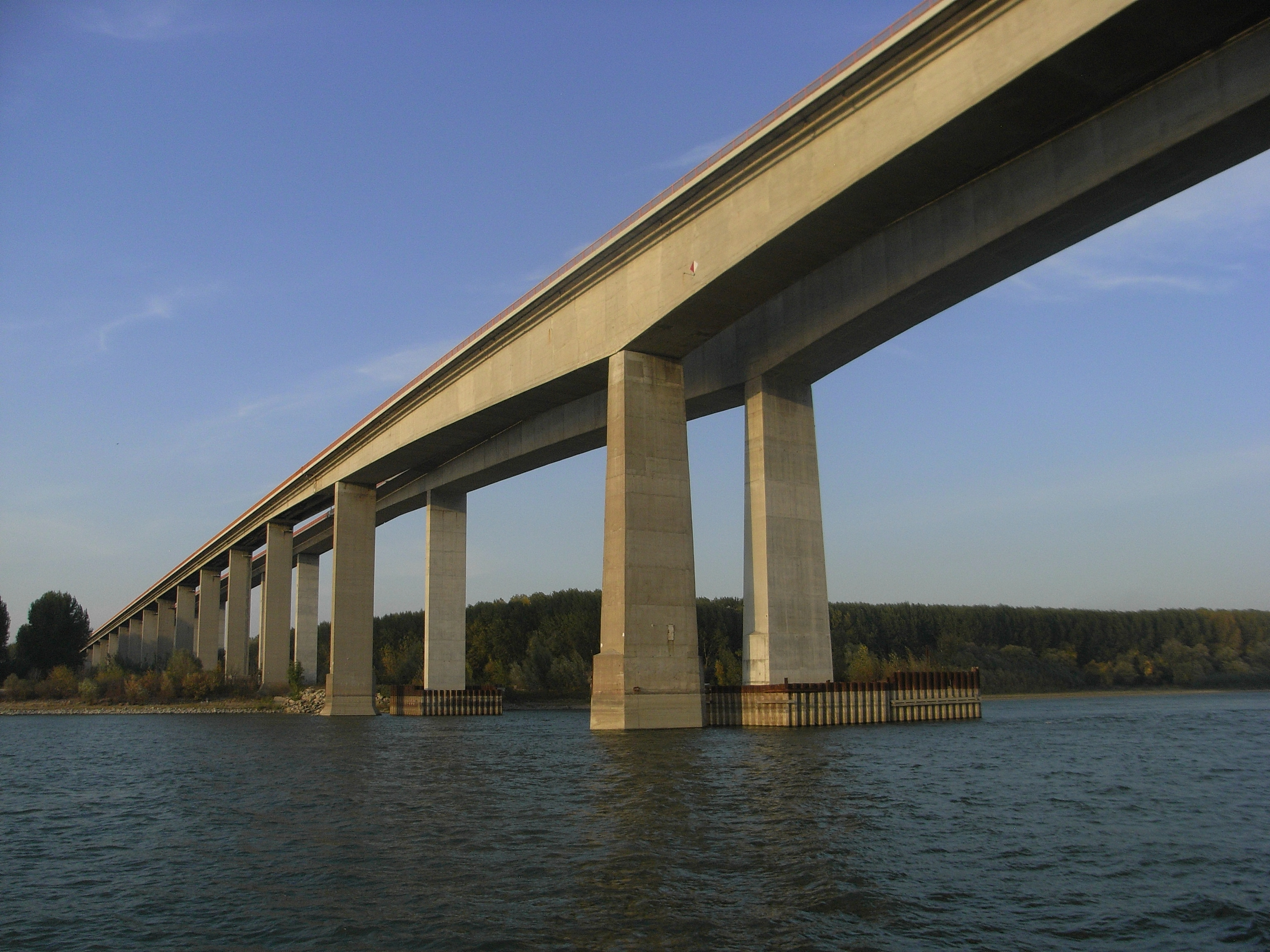
The E 75/A 1, Beška Bridge crossing near Beška, Serbia

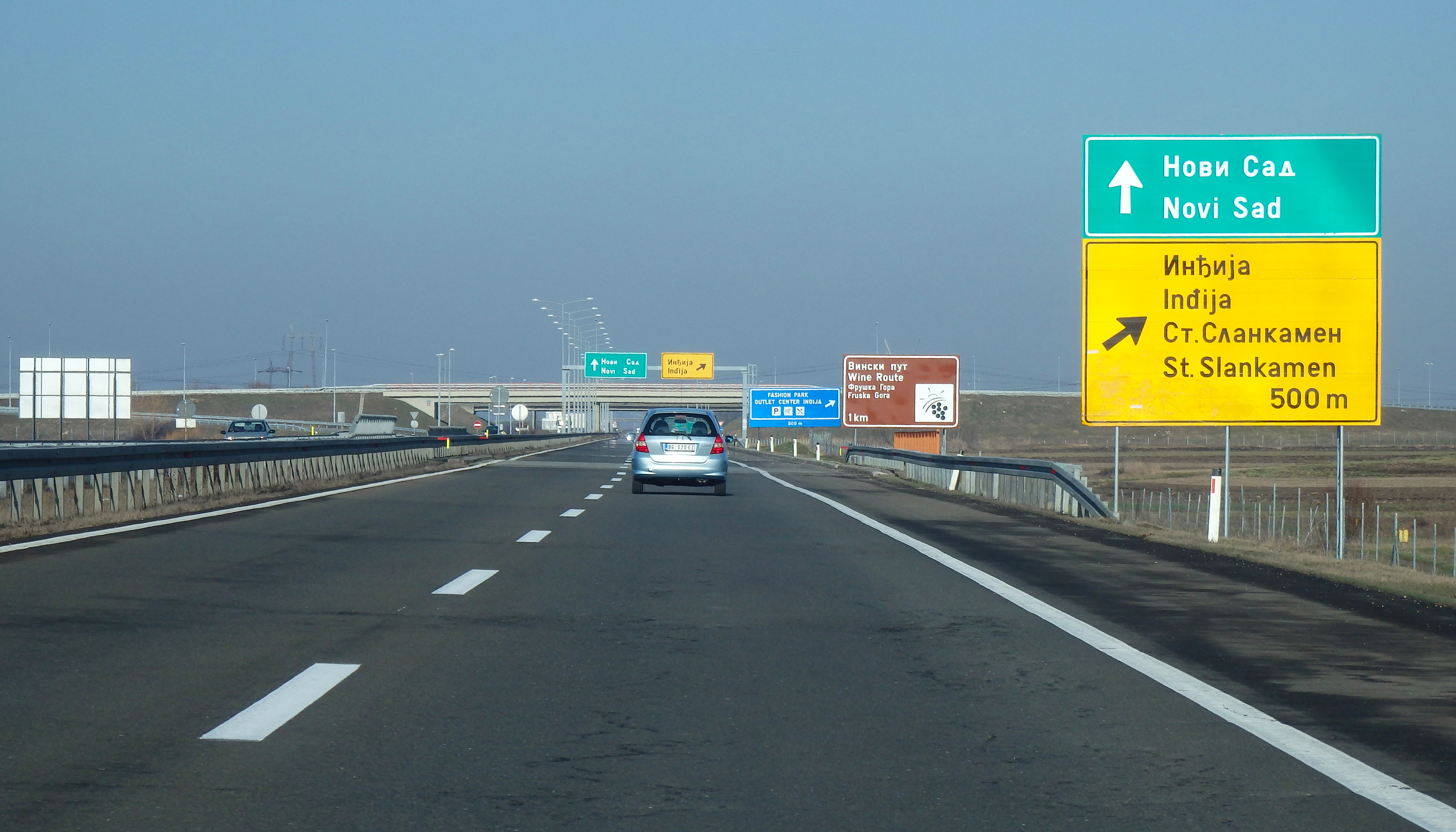
The E 75/A 1 near Inđija, Serbia

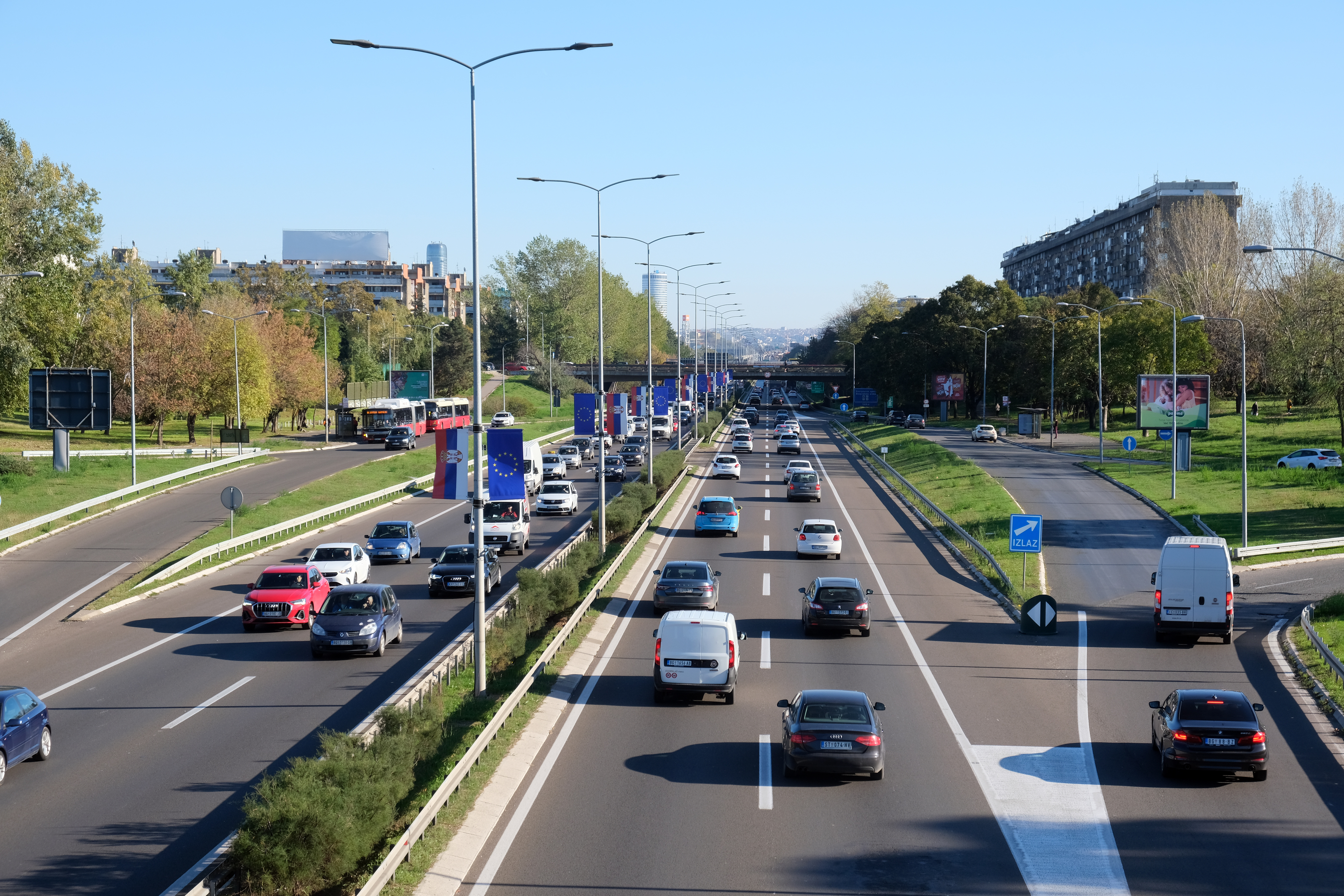
The E 75/A 1 in Belgrade, Serbia

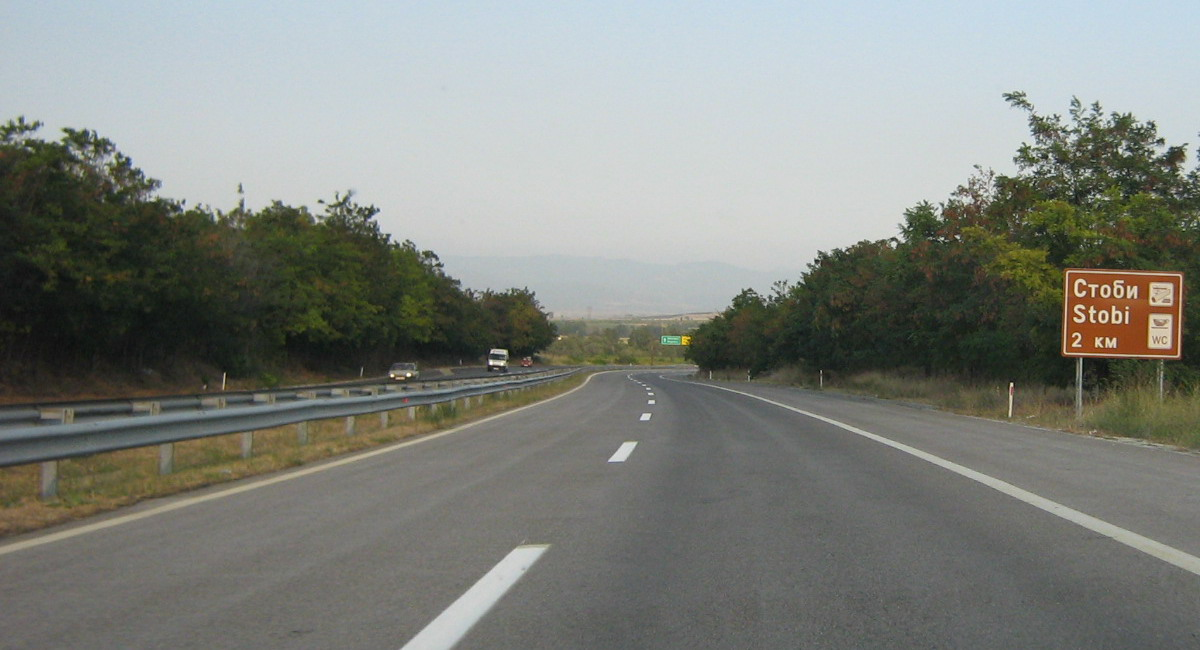
The E 75 near Stobi, North Macedonia

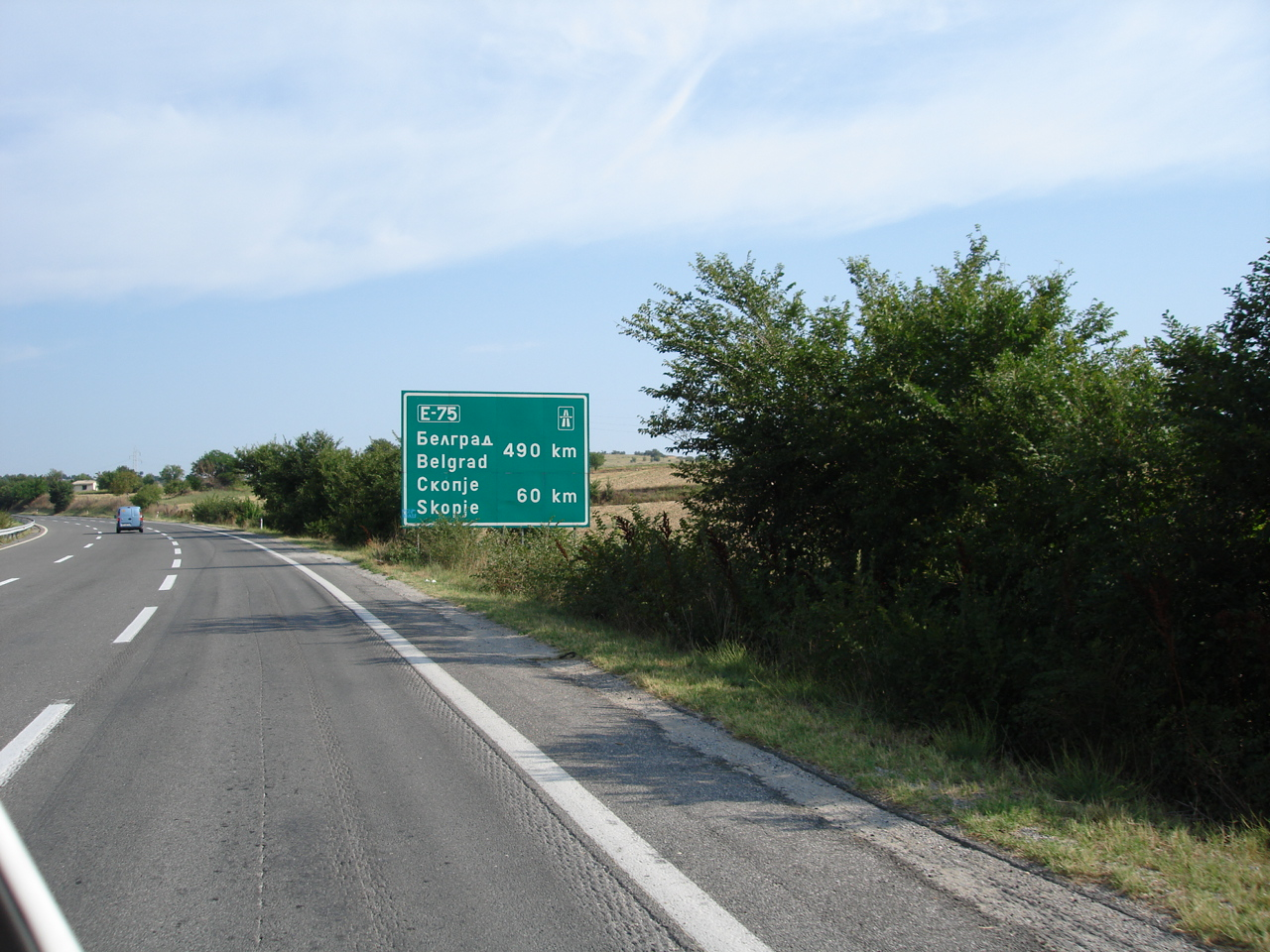
E75 M1 North Macedonia, near Veles (northbound view)

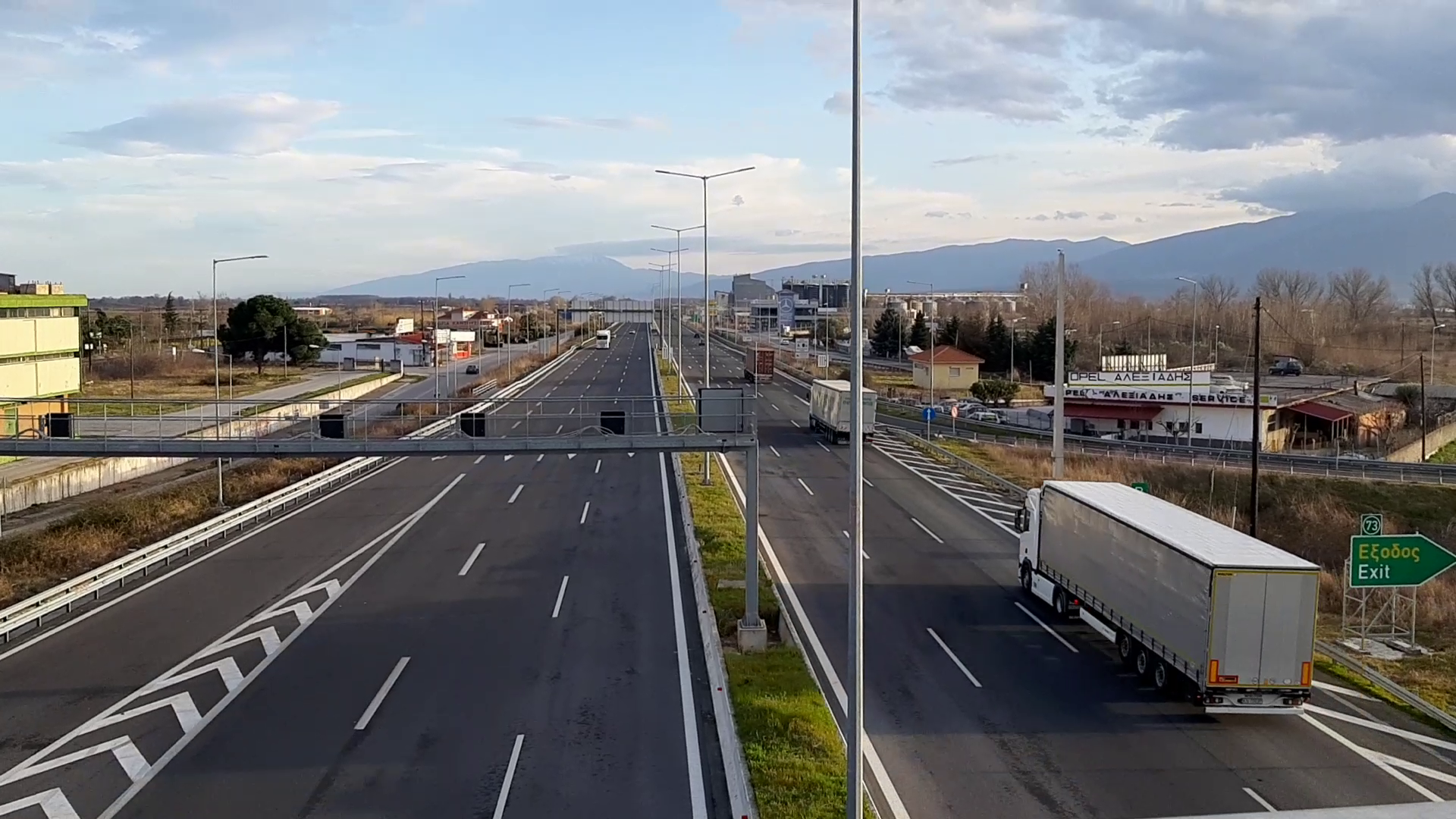
The E75 (A1) near Katerini, Greece (southbound view)

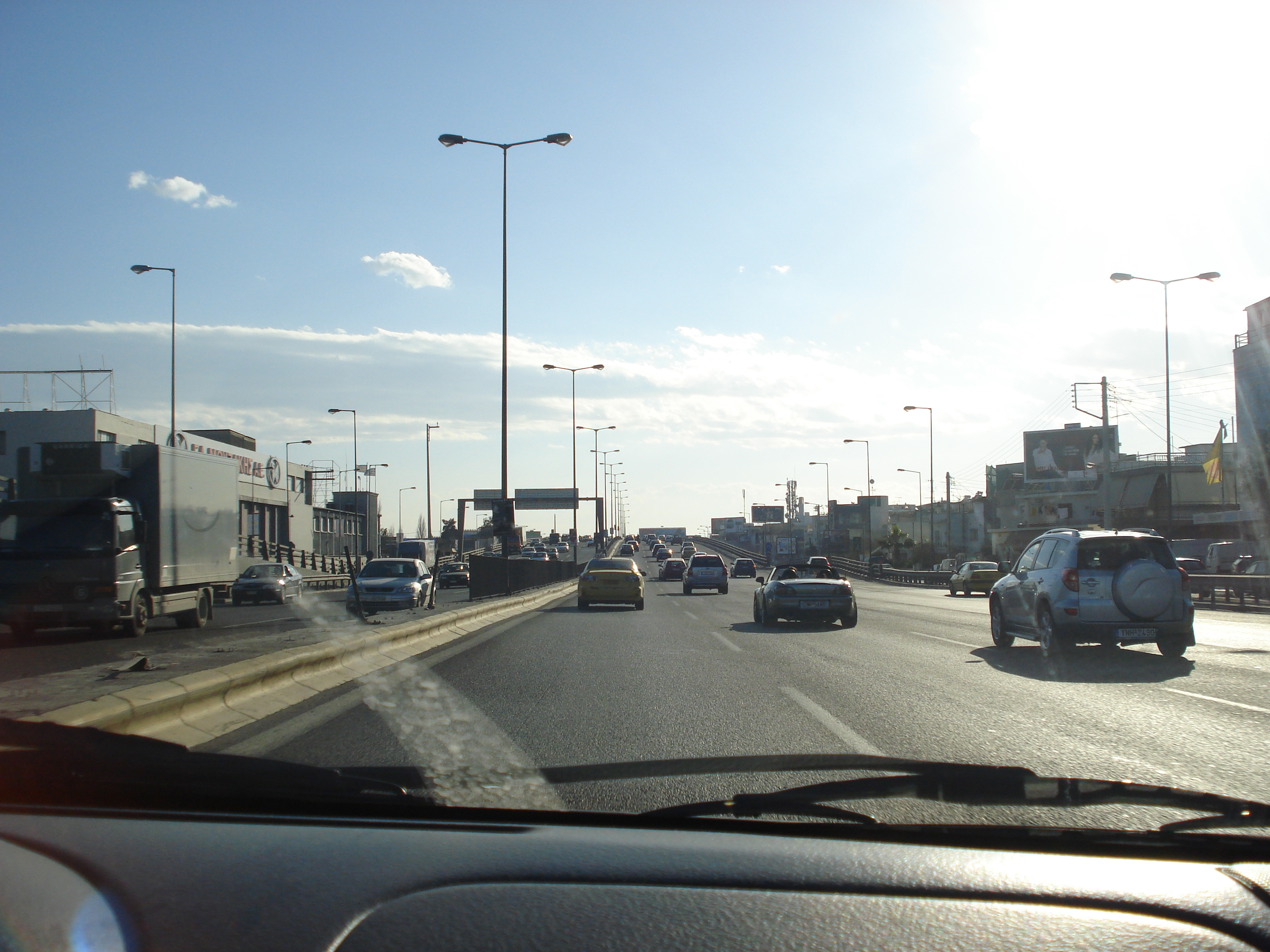
The E 75 at Athens, Greece

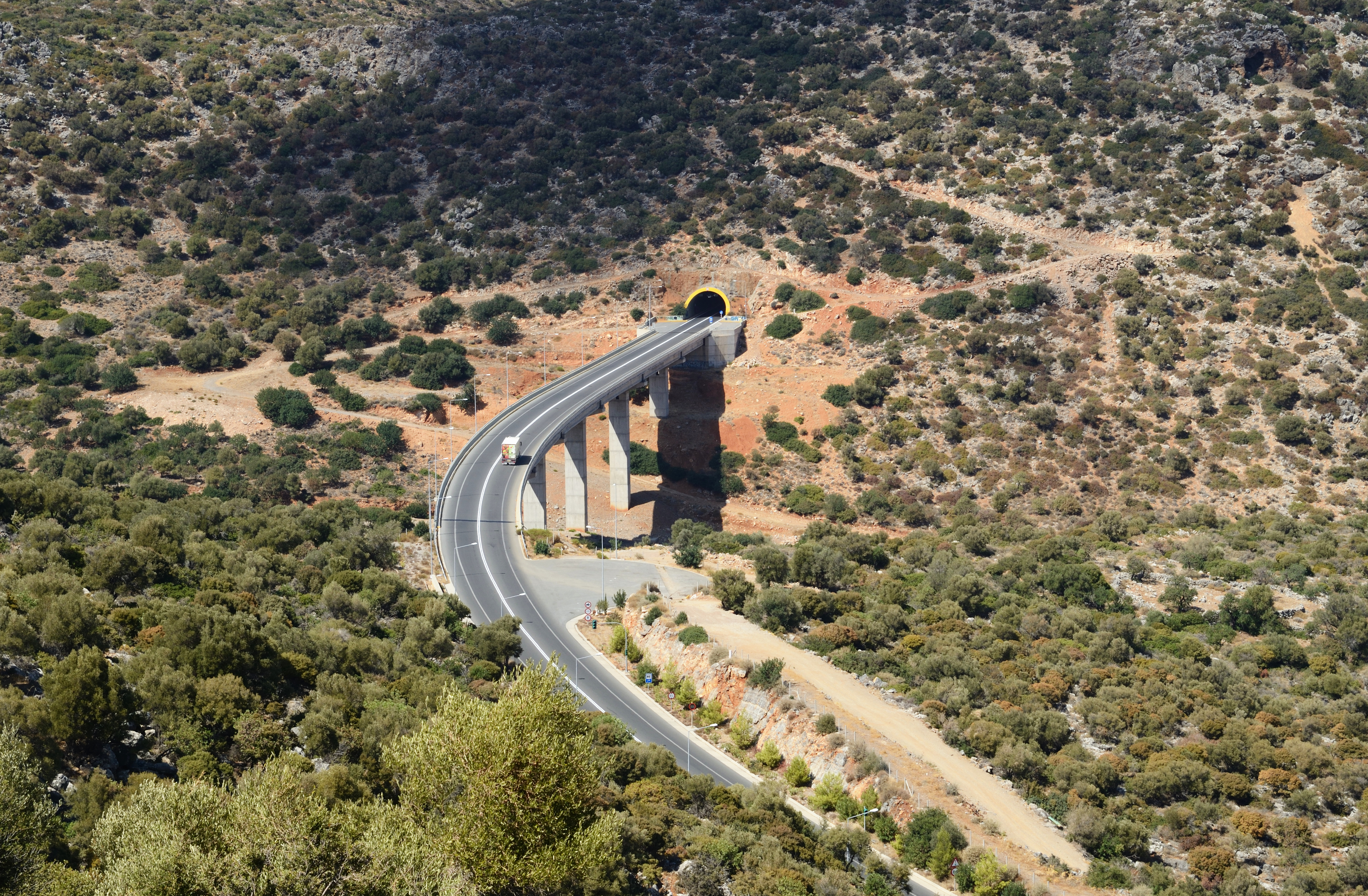
The E 75 near Heraklion, Greece

== See also ==
- Finnish national road 4
- Autostrada A1 (Poland)
- E75 in Serbia
- E75 in North Macedonia
- A1 motorway (Greece)
