= Hrčava =

- Municipality
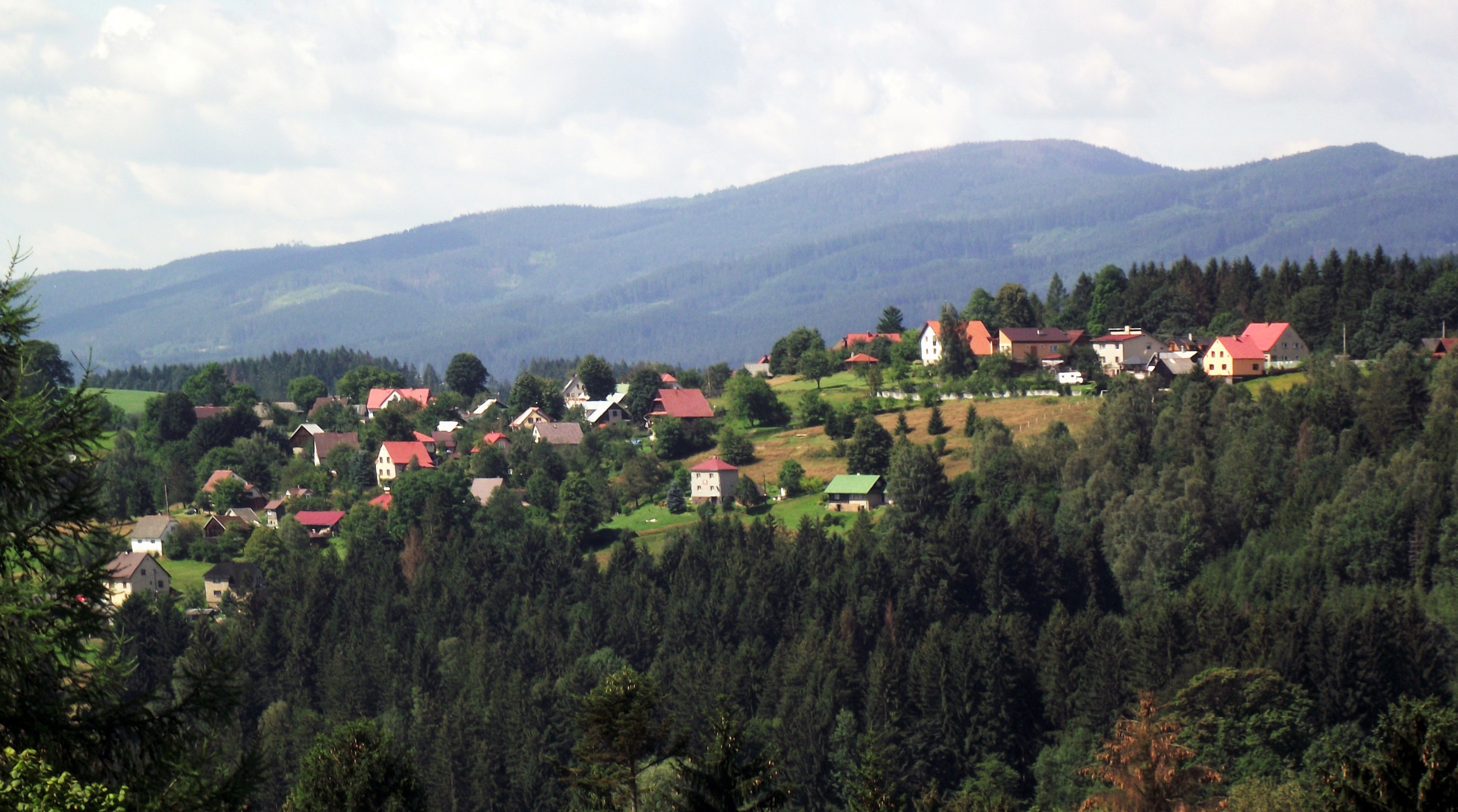
- General view

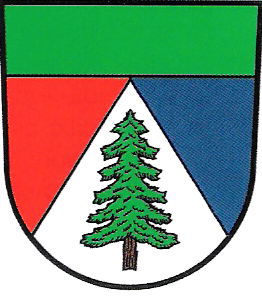
- Flag Coat of arms

- Location in the Czech Republic
- Coordinates: 49°31′12″N 18°49′59″E
- Country: Czech Republic
- Region: Moravian-Silesian
- District: Frýdek-Místek
- First mentioned: 1645

Area
  - Total: 2.89 km^{2} (1.12 sq mi)
- Elevation: 605 m (1,985 ft)

Population (2026-01-01)
  - Total: 244
  - Density: 84.4/km^{2} (219/sq mi)
- Time zone: UTC+1 (CET)
  - Summer (DST): UTC+2 (CEST)
- Postal code: 739 98
- Website: www.obechrcava.cz

Hrčava (Polish: Herczawa, German: Hertschawa) is a municipality and village in Frýdek-Místek District in the Moravian-Silesian Region of the Czech Republic. It has about 200 inhabitants.

== Geography ==
Hrčava is located about 39 kilometres (24 mi) southeast of Frýdek-Místek and 49 km (30 mi) southeast of Ostrava, in the historical region of Cieszyn Silesia. It is the second easternmost municipality of the country (after neighbouring Bukovec). The tripoint of the Czech Republic, Poland and Slovakia is located in the municipality.

Hrčava is situated in a hilly landscape of the Jablunkov Intermontane range. The highest point is on the slopes of the hill Na Dílech at 698 m (2,290 ft) above sea level.

== History ==
The first written mention of Hrčava is from 1645 as Hertiava, when Hungarian fortifications were built here. It was initially a hamlet administered by Jaworzynka, which belonged then to the Duchy of Teschen, a fee of Kingdom of Bohemia.

After World War I, Polish–Czechoslovak War and the division of Cieszyn Silesia in 1920, Jaworzynka with Hrčava became a part of Poland. In June 1921, Hrčava was temporarily annexed again to Czechoslovakia, but still was a part of Jaworzynka. In June 1924, it became a separate hamlet with a special legal status, administered by the district council. The municipality of Hrčava was established in October 1927.

Following the Munich Agreement, in October 1938, together with the Trans-Olza region they were annexed by Poland, administratively adjoined to Cieszyn County of Silesian Voivodeship. They were then annexed by Nazi Germany at the beginning of World War II. After the war it was restored to Czechoslovakia.

== Demographics ==
Historical population

Year	Pop.	±%
1900	–	—
1910	171	—
1921	186	+8.8%
1930	254	+36.6%

Year	Pop.	±%
1950	268	+5.5%
1961	310	+15.7%
1970	319	+2.9%
1980	315	−1.3%

Year	Pop.	±%
1991	273	−13.3%
2001	278	+1.8%
2011	250	−10.1%
2021	216	−13.6%

Source: Censuses

== Transport ==
There are no railways or major roads passing through the municipality. On the Czech–Polish border is the pedestrian border crossing Hrčava / Jaworzynka.

== Sights ==
The main landmark of Hrčava is the Church of Saints Cyril and Methodius. It dates from 1936 and it is the youngest wooden church in the region.
