= Skalité =

- Municipality
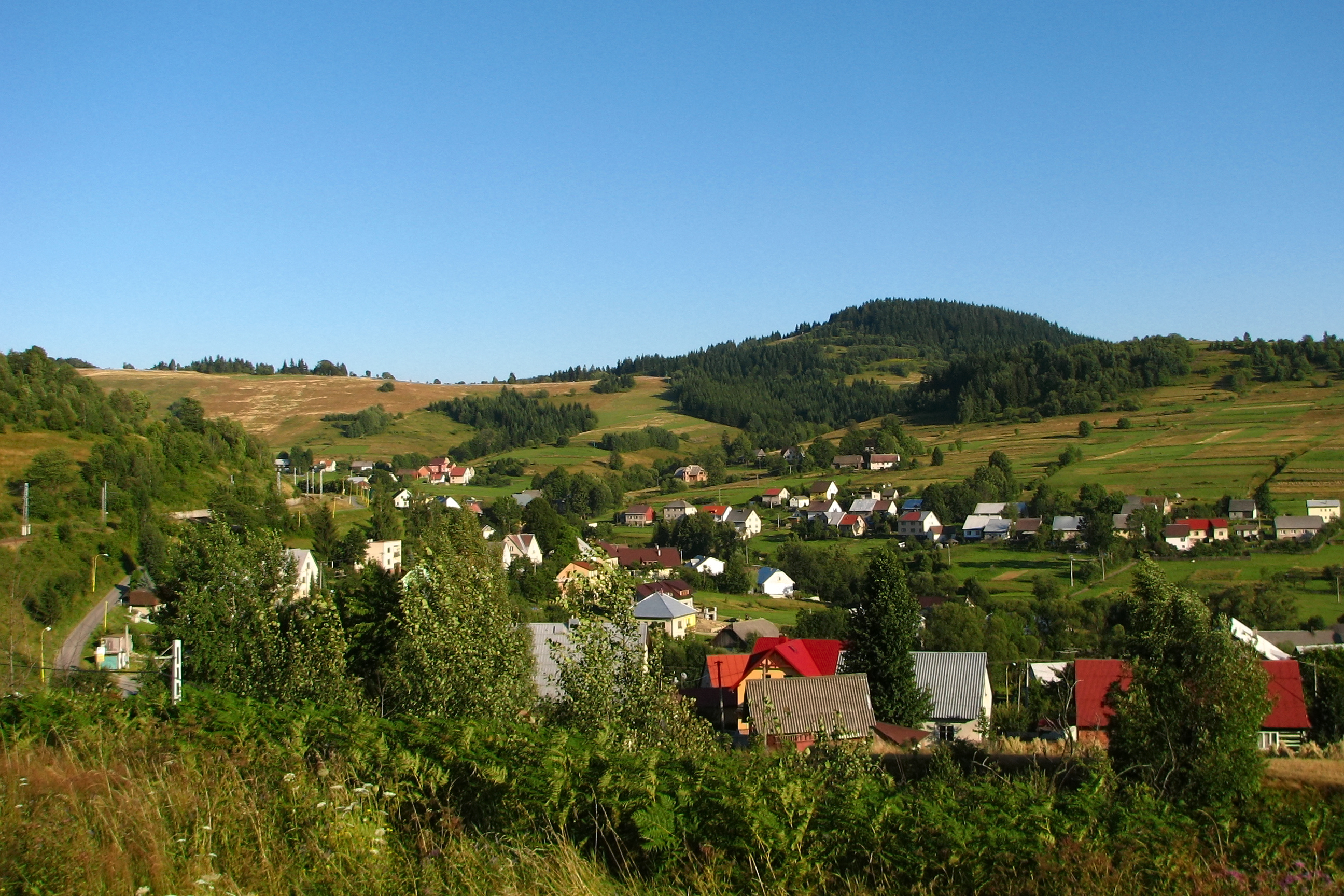

- Flag Coat of arms

- Location of Skalité in the Žilina Region Location of Skalité in Slovakia
- Coordinates: 49.50°N 18.90°E
- Country: Slovakia
- Region: Žilina Region
- District: Čadca District
- First mentioned: 1662

Area
  - Total: 33.16 km^{2} (12.80 sq mi)
- Elevation: 526 m (1,726 ft)

Population (2025)
  - Total: 5,211
- Time zone: UTC+1 (CET)
  - Summer (DST): UTC+2 (CEST)
- Postal code: 231 4
- Area code: +421 41
- Vehicle registration plate (until 2022): CA
- Website: www.skalite.sk

Skalité (Hungarian: Sziklaszoros) is a village and municipality in Čadca District in the Žilina Region of northern Slovakia.

== History ==
In historical records the village was first mentioned in 1662. In late October 1938, Skalite, together with adjacent villages, was occupied by the Polish Army. In response, units of the Czechoslovak Border Guard opened fire on the Polish units, and a skirmish took place, with some victims. On November 1, 1938, Poland and Czechoslovakia signed a treaty, after which a commission was created to establish a new borderline. On November 30 in Zakopane, both sides agreed that Skalité would be annexed by the Second Polish Republic. As a result, the town became a border station of the Polish State Railways, along the strategic line from Zwardoń to Čadca. In the period fall 1938 - September 1939, Polish trains ran along the Zwardoń - Čadca - Mosty Slaskie line, without stopping at Čadca railway station, which remained part of Czechoslovakia (later Slovakia). In September 1939, following the Polish September Campaign, Skalité was re-annexed by Slovakia.

== Geography ==
The municipality lies at an altitude of 526 metres (1,726 ft) and covers an area of 33.16 km^{2} (12.80 sq mi) (2025).

== Population ==
Population statistic (10 years)
Year	1995	2005	2015	2025
Count	4981	5135	5250	5211
Difference		+3.09%	+2.23%	−0.74%

Population statistic
Year	2024	2025
Count	5274	5211
Difference		−1.19%

It has a population of 5211 people (31 December 2025).

=== Ethnicity ===
Census 2021 (1+ %)
Ethnicity	Number	Fraction
Slovak	5177	98.66%
Not found out	81	1.54%
Total	5247	

In year 2021 was 5247 people by ethnicity 5177 as Slovak, 81 as Not found out, 36 as Czech, 9 as Other, 8 as Polish, 6 as Russian, 6 as Hungarian, 3 as Moravian, 3 as Greek, 2 as Ukrainian, 1 as Silesian, 1 as Romani, 1 as Rusyn, 1 as Austrian, 1 as German, 1 as Korean and 1 as Canadian.

Note on population: The difference values of population numbers in the table "Population statistic" and in the sections "Ethnicity" & "Religion" is caused by the use of various statistical methods.

=== Religion ===
Census 2021 (1+ %)
Religion	Number	Fraction
Roman Catholic Church	4799	91.46%
None	262	4.99%
Total	5247	

In year 2021 was 5247 people by religion 4799 from Roman Catholic Church, 262 from None, 48 from Not found out, 39 from Other and not ascertained christian church, 23 from Greek Catholic Church, 16 from Ad hoc movements, 12 from Evangelical Church, 9 from Paganism and natural spirituality, 9 from Christian Congregations in Slovakia, 6 from Calvinist Church, 6 from Other, 4 from Islam, 3 from Jehovah's Witnesses, 3 from Apostolic Church, 2 from Eastern Orthodox Church, 2 from Hinduism, 2 from Buddhism, 1 from United Methodist Church and 1 from Czechoslovak Hussite Church.
