= Svrčinovec =

- Municipality
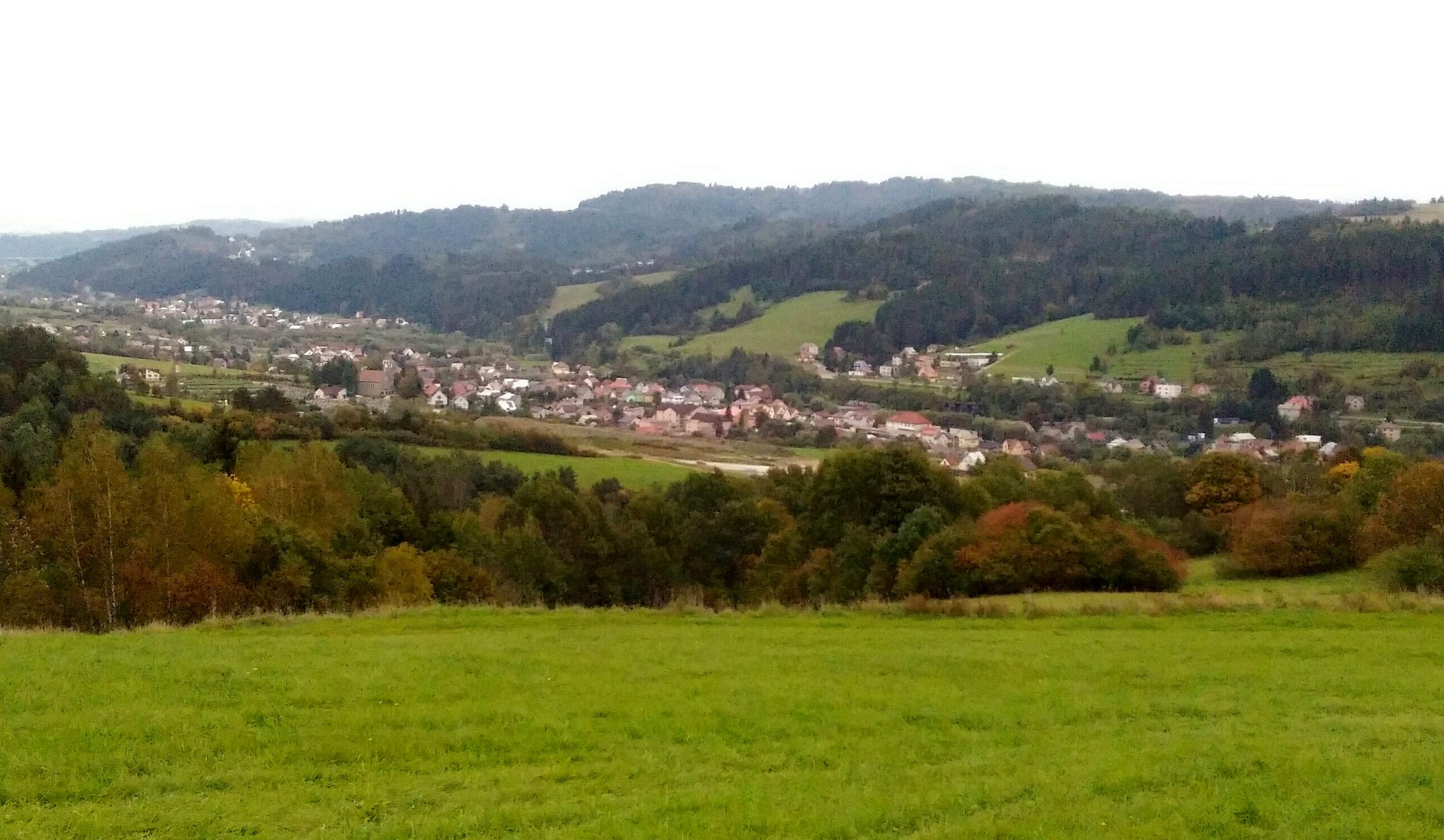

- Flag
- Interactive map of Svrčinovec
- Coordinates: 49.48°N 18.79°E
- Country: Slovakia
- Region: Žilina Region
- District: Čadca District
- First mentioned: 1658

Government
  - Mayor: Renáta Majchrákoá

Area
  - Total: 15.73 km^{2} (6.07 sq mi)
- Elevation: 432 m (1,417 ft)

Population (2025)
  - Total: 3,252
- Time zone: UTC+1 (CET)
  - Summer (DST): UTC+2 (CEST)
- Postal code: 231 2
- Area code: +421 41
- Vehicle registration plate (until 2022): CA
- Website: www.svrcinovec.sk

Svrčinovec (Hungarian: Fenyvesszoros, until 1899 Szvrcsinovecz) is a village and municipality in Čadca District in the Žilina Region of northern Slovakia.

== History ==
In historical records the village was first mentioned in 1658.

In November 1938, the village was annexed by the Polish Army, in wake of the annexation of Trans-Olza region to the Second Polish Republic.

== Geography ==
The municipality lies at an altitude of 432 metres (1,417 ft) and covers an area of 15.73 km^{2} (6.07 sq mi) (2025).

== Population ==
Population statistic (10 years)
Year	1995	2005	2015	2025
Count	3103	3490	3545	3252
Difference		+12.47%	+1.57%	−8.26%

Population statistic
Year	2024	2025
Count	3305	3252
Difference		−1.60%

It has a population of 3252 people (31 December 2025).

=== Ethnicity ===
Census 2021 (1+ %)
Ethnicity	Number	Fraction
Slovak	3308	98.16%
Not found out	52	1.54%
Total	3370	

In year 2021 was 3370 people by ethnicity 3308 as Slovak, 52 as Not found out, 28 as Czech, 8 as Polish, 8 as Other, 3 as Italian, 3 as Romani, 2 as Ukrainian, 2 as Russian, 1 as Rusyn and 1 as Bulgarian.

Note on population: The difference values of population numbers in the table "Population statistic" and in the sections "Ethnicity" & "Religion" is caused by the use of various statistical methods.

=== Religion ===
Census 2021 (1+ %)
Religion	Number	Fraction
Roman Catholic Church	3031	89.94%
None	222	6.59%
Not found out	44	1.31%
Total	3370	

In year 2021 was 3370 people by religion 3031 from Roman Catholic Church, 222 from None, 44 from Not found out, 20 from Christian Congregations in Slovakia, 13 from Greek Catholic Church, 10 from Evangelical Church, 7 from Apostolic Church, 6 from Jehovah's Witnesses, 5 from Other, 5 from Ad hoc movements, 2 from Buddhism, 1 from Jewish community, 1 from Calvinist Church, 1 from Paganism and natural spirituality, 1 from Other and not ascertained christian church and 1 from Seventh-day Adventist Church.
