= Bratislava bridgehead =

Part of Slovakia

Coordinates: 48°4′42″N 17°7′32″E

Map in Slovakian of the Bratislava bridgehead.

The Bratislava bridgehead is situated in the western part of Slovakia. It has an area of 93.7 square kilometres (36.2 sq mi). It is situated on the Little Hungarian Plain, on the right bank of the river Danube. Administratively, it belongs to the district Bratislava V in Bratislava, and has 111,135 inhabitants.

== History ==
As a result of the Treaty of Trianon - the peace treaty concluded between the Allies of World War I and Hungary after the First World War - a bridgehead was created for Czechoslovakia on the right bank of river Danube at Bratislava, supposedly for defensive purposes. At this time Petržalka and its surroundings were handed over to Czechoslovakia.

In October 1938, as part of the Munich Agreement, Petržalka and Devín were ceded to Germany for strategic purposes.

At the end of World War II, ceasefire agreements mainly restored the pre-war boundaries, except for Carpathian Ruthenia, which became part of Soviet Ukraine in accordance with the Moscow Agreement. A camp for interned Hungarians and Germans was operated in Petržalka.

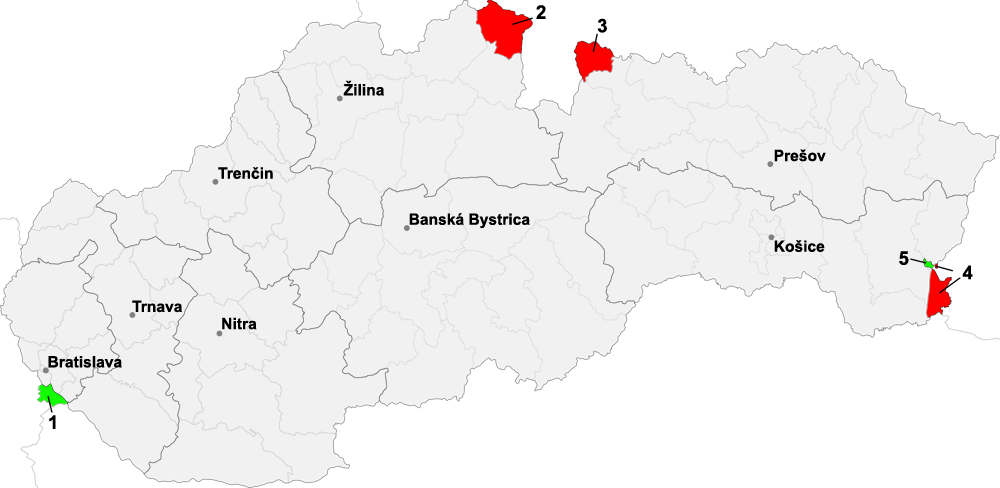
Territories involved in the Paris Peace Treaties. The Bratislava bridgehead is in green.

At the Paris Peace Conference the Czechoslovakian delegation wanted to expand the territory of the Bratislava bridgehead. They sought Dunacsún (Čunovo), Horvátjárfalu (Jarovce), Oroszvár (Rusovce), Rajka and Bezenye. Only the first three were granted to them, and they acquired a territory of 62 km^{2} of Hungary.

During the 1970s, a microdistrict was built at Petržalka, with a population of 100,000 inhabitants. Today; its four villages are forming a part of the Bratislava V district.

Between 1977 and 1992, some sub-components of the Gabčíkovo–Nagymaros Dams were built there. The dam built at Čunovo diverts the four-fifths of the water flow of the Danube to Slovakian territory.
