= D2 motorway =

D2 motorway may refer to:

- D2 motorway (Slovakia)
- D2 motorway (Czech Republic)
