= Rusovce Mansion =

Mansion in Bratislava, Slovakia

Coordinates: 48°03′09″N 17°09′04″E

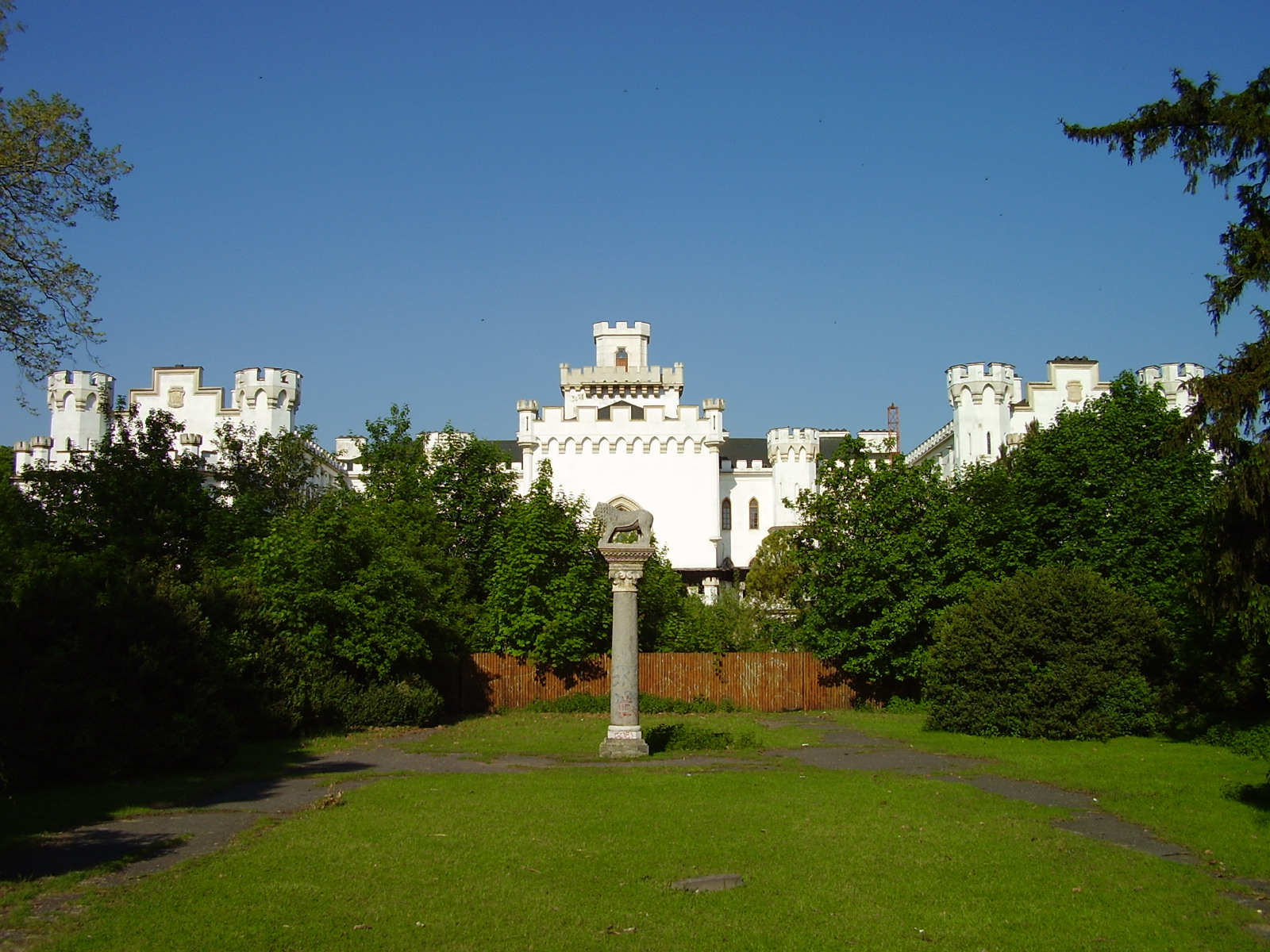
Rusovce mansion

Rusovce Mansion or Rusovce manor house (Slovak: Rusovský kaštieľ, Hungarian: Oroszvár; German: Karlburg) is a mansion located in the Rusovce borough, part of Bratislava, capital of Slovakia. The mansion was built on the site of an older manor house from the 16th century, with a medieval structure incorporated into the following buildings.

The façade got its current look by application of the Tudor and English Neogothic styles. The manor house is surrounded by an English park. The premises cover 24 km^{2} on both banks of the Danube river.

In the twentieth century, mansion and premises have been owned by Hungarian Prince Elemer Lonyay, husband to Princess Stéphanie of Belgium, widow of Crown Prince Rudolph of Austria-Hungary. The couple lived in the mansion until early in 1945. Lonyay, who died in Budapest in 1946, left the estate to the Benedictine Order, who had given refuge to him and his wife during the last weeks of World War II at Pannonhalma Archabbey.

In 1947, due to the Paris Peace Treaty, Hungary had to cede the area to Czechoslovakia. The then communist government seized the premises in 1948. Currently, the building is managed by the Slovak Republic Government Office and closed to the public. The government has refused to return the estate to the Benedictine Order, who after unsuccessfully calling to the Slovak Constitutional Court is said to seek a decision at the European Court of Justice in 2009.
