= Paris Peace Treaties, 1947 =

Treaties signed in Paris on 10 February 1947

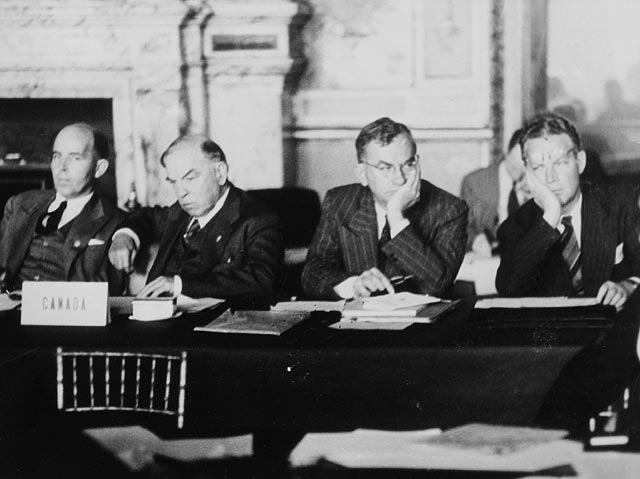
- Canadian delegation at the Paris Peace Conference, Palais du Luxembourg. Left to right: Norman Robertson, William Lyon Mackenzie King, Brooke Claxton, Arnold Heeney
- Type: Multilateral treaties
- Signed: 10 February 1947
- Location: Paris, France
- Effective: 15 September 1947
- Parties: United Kingdom; Soviet Union; United States; France; "Former member of the Tripartite Pact"; Italy; "Ally of Nazi Germany"; Romania; Hungary; Bulgaria; Finland
- Ratifiers: All signatories

The Paris Peace Treaties (French: Traités de Paris) were signed on 10 February 1947 following the end of World War II in 1945. The Paris Peace Conference lasted from 29 July until 15 October 1946. The victorious wartime Allied powers (principally the United Kingdom, Soviet Union, United States, and France) negotiated the details of peace treaties with the former (mostly minor) European Rome-Berlin-Tokyo Axis powers, namely Italy, Romania, Hungary, Bulgaria, and Finland. They were allowed to fully resume their responsibilities as sovereign states in international affairs and to qualify for membership in the United Nations. (Note: They each joined the United Nations on 14 December 1955.)

The settlement elaborated in the peace treaties included payment of war reparations, commitment to minority rights, and territorial adjustments including the end of the Italian colonial empire in North Africa, East Africa, Yugoslavia, Greece, and Albania, as well as changes to the Italian–Yugoslav, Hungarian–Czechoslovak, Soviet–Romanian, Hungarian–Romanian, French–Italian, and Soviet–Finnish borders. The treaties also obliged the various states to hand over accused war criminals to the Allied powers for war crimes trials.

== Political clauses ==
The political clauses stipulated that the signatory should "take all measures necessary to secure to all persons under (its) jurisdiction, without distinction as to race, sex, language or religion, the enjoyment of human rights and of the fundamental freedoms, including freedom of expression, of press and publication, of religious worship, of political opinion and of public meeting."

No penalties were to be visited on nationals because of wartime partisanship for the Allies. Each government undertook measures to prevent the resurgence of fascist organizations or any others "whether political, military or semi-military, whose purpose it is to deprive the people of their democratic rights".

== Border changes ==
=== Italy ===
Italy lost the colonies of Italian Libya and Italian East Africa. The latter consisted of Italian Ethiopia, Italian Eritrea, and Italian Somaliland. Italy continued to govern Italian Somaliland as a UN trust territory until 1960. In the peace treaty, Italy recognized the independence of Albania (in personal union with the Italian monarchy after the Italian invasion of Albania in April 1939). Italy also lost its concession in Tianjin, which was turned over to China, and the Italian Islands of the Aegean (Dodecanese Islands) in the Aegean Sea were ceded to Greece.

Istria, the provinces of Fiume, Zara, and most of Gorizia and Pola were ceded to Yugoslavia. People on both sides were given the right of option of nationality, with the possible requirement of leaving the territory of their foreign state. The province of Trieste formed a new sovereign State (Free Territory of Trieste) divided into two administrative zones under a provisional government for which the United Nations Security Council was responsible. In 1954, Italy incorporated the Province of Trieste (Zone A) and Yugoslavia incorporated the rest of Istria (Zone B). This was officially recognized with the Treaty of Osimo in 1975.

The villages of the Tende valley and La Brigue were ceded to France but Italian diplomats were able to maintain in place the Treaty of Turin (1860), according to which the French-Italian alpine border passes through the summit of Mont Blanc, despite French designs on the Aosta Valley. The French Republic has never made provision for the Italian language in the ceded formerly Italian towns of Briga and Tenda, effectively opting for a policy of linguistic assimilation. The province of South Tyrol was also kept by Italy despite the territorial demands of Austria, largely thanks to the Gruber–De Gasperi Agreement signed some months before.

=== Finland ===
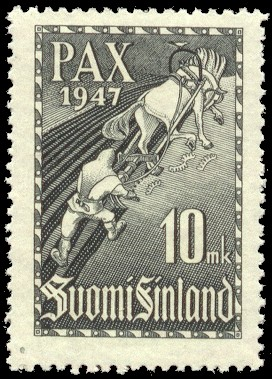
A Finnish postage stamp from 1947 commemorating the Paris Peace Treaty

Finland was restored to its borders of 1 January 1941 (thus confirming its territorial losses after the Winter War of 1939–1940), except for the former province of Petsamo, which was ceded to the Soviet Union. In Finland, the reparations and the dictated border adjustment were perceived as a major injustice and a betrayal by the Western powers, after the sympathy Finland had received from the West during the Soviet-initiated Winter War. However, this sympathy had been eroded by Finland's collaboration with Nazi Germany between 1941 and 1944. During this time, Finland not only recaptured territory it had lost in 1940, but continued its offensive deeper into Soviet lands, occupying a broad strip of Soviet territory. This prompted the United Kingdom to declare war on Finland in December 1941, further weakening political support in the West for the country. The Soviet Union's accessions of Finnish territory was based on the Moscow Armistice signed in Moscow on 19 September 1944 and resulted in an extension of the accessions in the Moscow Peace Treaty that ended the Winter War.

=== Hungary ===
Hungary was restored to its borders before 1938. This meant restoring the southern border with Yugoslavia, as well as declaring the First and Second Vienna Awards null and void, cancelling Hungary's gains from Czechoslovakia and Romania. Furthermore, three villages (namely Horvátjárfalu, Oroszvár, and Dunacsún) situated south of Bratislava were also transferred to Czechoslovakia, in order to form the so-called "Bratislava bridgehead".

=== Romania ===
Romania was restored to its borders of 1 January 1941, but not to its borders before 23 August 1939, with the exception of the border with Hungary giving Northern Transylvania back to Romania. This confirmed the 1940 loss of Bessarabia and Northern Bukovina to the Soviet Union and the Treaty of Craiova, which returned Southern Dobruja to Bulgaria.

=== Bulgaria ===
Bulgaria was restored to its borders of 1 January 1941, returning Vardar Macedonia to Yugoslavia and Eastern Macedonia and Western Thrace to Greece (both taken from the Hellenic State when it was created), but keeping Southern Dobruja per the Treaty of Craiova, leaving Bulgaria as the only former Axis power to keep territory that was gained during the Second World War.

== War reparations ==
The war reparation problem proved to be one of the most difficult arising from post-war conditions. The Soviet Union, the country most heavily ravaged by the war, felt entitled to the maximum amounts possible, with the exception of Bulgaria, which was perceived as being the most sympathetic of the former enemy states. (Bulgaria was part of the Axis but did not declare war on the Soviet Union). In the cases of Romania and Hungary, the reparation terms as set forth in their armistices were relatively high and were not revised.

War reparations at 1938 prices, in United States dollar amounts:

- $360,000,000 (equivalent to $8,234,000,000 in 2025) from Italy:
  - $125,000,000 (equivalent to $2,859,000,000 in 2025) to Yugoslavia;
  - $105,000,000 (equivalent to $2,402,000,000 in 2025) to Greece;
  - $100,000,000 (equivalent to $2,287,000,000 in 2025) to the Soviet Union;
  - $25,000,000 (equivalent to $572,000,000 in 2025) to Ethiopia;
  - $5,000,000 (equivalent to $114,000,000 in 2025) to Albania.
- $300,000,000 (equivalent to $6,862,000,000 in 2025) from Finland to the Soviet Union.
- $300,000,000 (equivalent to $6,862,000,000 in 2025) from Hungary:
  - $200,000,000 (equivalent to $4,574,000,000 in 2025) to the Soviet Union;
  - $100,000,000 (equivalent to $2,287,000,000 in 2025) to Czechoslovakia and Yugoslavia.
- $300,000,000 (equivalent to $6,862,000,000 in 2025) from Romania to the Soviet Union;
- $70,000,000 (equivalent to $1,601,000,000 in 2025) from Bulgaria:
  - $45,000,000 (equivalent to $1,029,000,000 in 2025) to Greece;
  - $25,000,000 (equivalent to $572,000,000 in 2025) to Yugoslavia.

== Aftermath ==
Italy, Romania, Hungary, Bulgaria and Finland all joined the United Nations on 14 December 1955.

The dissolution of the Soviet Union and Yugoslavia in the early 1990s did not lead to any renegotiation of the Paris Peace Treaties. However, in 1990 Finland unilaterally cancelled the restrictions the treaty had placed on its military.

== See also ==
- List of Paris meetings, agreements and declarations
- Aftermath of World War II
- Allied Commission
- Potsdam Agreement (1945, regarding Germany)
- Moscow Conference (1945)
- Treaty of San Francisco (1951, regarding Japan)
- Treaty on the Final Settlement with Respect to Germany (1990)
- Soviet occupation of Romania
- World War II reparations towards Yugoslavia
