= D4 motorway =

D4 motorway may refer to:

- D4 motorway (Slovakia)
- D4 motorway (Czech Republic)
