= D2 motorway (Slovakia) =

Motorway in Slovakia

D2 Motorway
- Diaľnica D2
- Completed

Route information
- Part of E58 E65 E75
- Length: 80.5 km (50.0 mi)

Major junctions
- From: D2 border with the Czech Republic
- D1 Stupava; D1 Bratislava - Pečna; D1 Bratislava - Jarovce
- To: M15 border with Hungary

Location
- Country: Slovakia
- Regions: Trnava Region, Bratislava Region
- Major cities: Malacky, Bratislava

Highway system
- Highways in Slovakia
← D1	→ D3

The D2 is a motorway (Slovak: Diaľnica D2) in Slovakia. It connects the Czech border at Kúty with the Hungarian border at Čunovo, passing through (ordered north to south) Malacky, Bratislava and Jarovce.

It is part of the European routes E65 and E75 and of the Pan-European Corridor IV. The construction of the 80-kilometre-long (50 mi) highway started in 1969 and concluded in 2007. It is the only complete highway in Slovakia.

== History ==
The first plans on D2 motorway/freeway appeared in the 1960s, from the Czechoslovak government act in 1963 to build the 117 km long motorway from Brno to Bratislava, with 58.4 km in today's Slovakia. The construction started in April 1969, with the first section from Bratislava to Malacky, which was open in November 1973.

In 1974, construction also started on the Czech side from Brno, with the two ends of the motorways joining on 8 November 1980, a day, when also the D1 motorway between Prague and Brno was completed, joining the three most important cities in the country (Prague, Brno and Bratislava). A new planned segment from Bratislava to the Hungarian border was added in 1987. Construction continued with the building of the Lanfranconi Bridge in Bratislava and the junction with D61 (now D1) motorway junction and temporary end in Petržalka in the years 1985 - 1991 and after its opening, construction stopped for five years.

Construction resumed only in 1996, with the sections from the temporary end to Hungary and Austria, with all being opened in 1998 and with the 8.5 km segment from D4 junction to the Hungarian border being widened in 2002. Today, the motorway is complete, with the last 3 km in Bratislava being opened on 24 June 2007.

As of 2012, part of the D2 highway is still not officially finished as it was put into temporary use 12 years ago and the paperwork to legalize the section of the highway near Jarovce is unobtainable due to excessive noise levels.

=== Future developments ===
There are plans to widen the motorway to a six lane motorway with 3 lanes going one way and this is to be done by 2033.

== Route description ==
Country	Region	Location	km	mi	Exit	Name	Destinations	Notes
Slovakia	Bratislava Region	Bratislava Region	0	0.0	Slovakia-Czech Republic border	Břeclav-Brodské border crossing	D2 E65	Kilometrage starting point
Slovakia	Bratislava Region	Bratislava Region	5	3.1	—	Kúty	I/2	
Slovakia	Bratislava Region	Bratislava Region			Rest area	Sekule		
Slovakia	Bratislava Region	Bratislava Region			Rest area	Malacky		
Slovakia	Bratislava Region	Bratislava Region	26	16	—	Studienka		
Slovakia	Bratislava Region	Bratislava Region	29	18	—	Malacky		
Slovakia	Bratislava Region	Bratislava Region	37	23	—	Priemyselný autopark Lozorno		Southbound exit only
Slovakia	Bratislava Region	Bratislava Region	45	28	—	Stupava-sever		
Slovakia	Bratislava Region	Bratislava Region	50	31	—	Stupava-juh	D4	
Slovakia	Bratislava Region	Bratislava Region	55	34	—	Bratislava-Lamač		
Slovakia	Bratislava Region	Bratislava Region	57	35	—	Bratislava-Alexyho ulica		
Slovakia	Bratislava Region	Bratislava Region			Rest area	Lamač		
Slovakia	Bratislava Region	Bratislava Region	59	37	—	Bratislava-Polianky	I/2	
Slovakia	Bratislava Region	Bratislava Region	61	38	—	Bratislava-Mlynská dolina	I/2	
Slovakia	Bratislava Region	Bratislava Region	64	40	—	Bratislava-Petržalka-Pečňa I	D1 E58 E75	
Slovakia	Bratislava Region	Bratislava Region	65	40	—	Bratislava-Petržalka-Pečňa II	I/61	
Slovakia	Bratislava Region	Bratislava Region	65	40	—	Bratislava-Petržalka-Pečňa	D1 E58 E75	
Slovakia	Bratislava Region	Bratislava Region	66	41	—	Bratislava-Kapitulské pole		
Slovakia	Bratislava Region	Bratislava Region			Rest area	Jarovce		
Slovakia	Bratislava Region	Bratislava Region	71	44	—	Bratislava-Jarovce	D4 E58	
Slovakia	Bratislava Region	Bratislava Region	79	49	—	Čunovo	I/2	In preparation
Slovakia	Bratislava Region	Bratislava Region	79	49	—	Rusovce-Rajka border crossing	M15 E65 E75	Kilometrage end point Road continues as Hungarian M15
1.000 mi = 1.609 km; 1.000 km = 0.621 mi: Incomplete access; Proposed; Route transition

== Toll status ==
The D2 is subject to a vignette requirement which is compulsory for all drivers. Exempt from the requirement are sections located in Bratislava. The exemption also applies to the section from Lamač to the D2xD4 intersection near Stupava, which was made toll-free in 2024. Due to a construction on a second class road connecting Slovakia with the Czech Republic, a section from the Czech border to the Kúty intersection was temporarily exempted from the vignette requirement in March 2025.

== Tunnel ==
The motorway is accompanied by a single tunnel, the Sitina tunnel, which was opened along with the last 3 km in Bratislava on June 24, 2007. It is the only 2-tube tunnel in Slovakia with an ADR category of E.

Tunnel	Length (m)	Notes	Speed limit	Vehicles per day	ADR category
Sitina	1,440 (right tube) 1,415 (left tube)	opened on June 24, 2007	80 km/h (50 mph)	49,264 (2010)	E
