= R7 expressway (Slovakia) =

Expressway in Slovakia

Expressway R7
- Rýchlostná cesta R7
- Completed Under construction Planned

Route information
- Part of E575
- Length: 223.8 km (139.1 mi) Completed: 32.2 km (20.0 mi); Planned: 191.6 km (119.1 mi)

Major junctions
- From: D1 Bratislava - Nivy
- D4 Bratislava - South; R3 near Horné Semerovce (planned)
- To: R2 near Lučenec (planned)

Location
- Country: Slovakia
- Regions: Bratislava Region, Trnava Region, Nitra Region, Banská Bystrica Region
- Major cities: Bratislava, Dunajská Streda, Nové Zámky, Lučenec

Highway system
- Highways in Slovakia

R7 expressway is an expressway (Slovak: rýchlostná cesta) in Slovakia which, when completed, will connect Bratislava, Dunajská Streda, Nové Zámky, Veľký Krtíš and Lučenec. The total length of the expressway will be 223.8 kilometres (139.1 mi), of which 32.4 kilometres (20.1 mi) is in operation, with 191.6 kilometres (119.1 mi) planned. The R7 will be concurrent with the European road E575 on the section from Bratislava to Dunajská Streda.

== Route description ==
Country	Region	Location	km	mi	Exit	Name	Destinations	Notes
Slovakia	Bratislava Region	Bratislava Region	0	0.0	—	Bratislava-Nivy I	I/61 D1	Kilometrage starting point Road continues as the Slovak I/61
Slovakia	Bratislava Region	Bratislava Region	1	0.62	—	Bratislava-Nivy II		Start of a 3-lane dual carriageway
Slovakia	Bratislava Region	Bratislava Region	6	3.7	—	Bratislava-juh	D4	End of the 3-lane dual carriageway
Slovakia	Trnava Region	Trnava Region	15	9.3	—	Šamorín-západ	I/63	
Slovakia	Trnava Region	Trnava Region	22	14	—	Šamorín-sever	I/63	
Slovakia	Trnava Region	Trnava Region	24	15	Rest area	Blatná na Ostrove		
Slovakia	Trnava Region	Trnava Region	32	20	—	Holice	I/63	Temporary end
Slovakia	Trnava Region	Trnava Region	38	24	—	Dunajská Streda		Proposed
Slovakia	Trnava Region	Trnava Region	43	27	—	Mliečany		Proposed
Slovakia	Trnava Region	Trnava Region	52	32	—	Dolný Bar	I/63	Proposed
Slovakia	Nitra Region	Nitra Region	76	47	—	Zemné		Proposed
Slovakia	Nitra Region	Nitra Region	90	56	—	Nové Zámky		Proposed
Slovakia	Nitra Region	Nitra Region	105	65	—	Bešeňov		Proposed
Slovakia	Nitra Region	Nitra Region	119	74	—	Čaka		Proposed
Slovakia	Nitra Region	Nitra Region	130	81	—	Šárovce	I/76	Proposed
Slovakia	Nitra Region	Nitra Region	140	87	—	Demandice	I/75	Proposed
Slovakia	Nitra Region	Nitra Region	150	93	—	Tupá	I/66	Proposed
Slovakia	Nitra Region	Nitra Region	162	101	—	Šahy	R3	Proposed
Slovakia	Nitra Region	Nitra Region	168	104	—	Tešmák		Proposed
Slovakia	Banska Bystrica Region	Banska Bystrica Region	191	119	—	Veľký Krtíš		Proposed
Slovakia	Banska Bystrica Region	Banska Bystrica Region	208	129	—	Kľačany		Proposed
Slovakia	Banska Bystrica Region	Banska Bystrica Region	224	139	—	Lučenec	R2	Proposed Kilometrage end point
Slovakia	1.000 mi = 1.609 km; 1.000 km = 0.621 mi: Proposed							

== Chronology ==
Plans for the R7 date back to the 1990s, after independence from Czechoslovakia a two-lane express road was envisaged. The preparation of the project was approved by the Slovak Government on the 26 June 2003. In October 2005, a comprehensive technical study was prepared, followed by the preparation of documents and variant solutions for routing individual sections for environmental impact assessment. The opinions for the first sections were issued by the Slovak Ministry of Environment in May 2009.

The western part of the R7 was part of a PPP project awarded to Spanish construction company Cintra on 1 February 2016. On 20 May 2016, the concession contract was signed, and a financial close was reached on 22 June 2016, covering the construction of 32.1 kilometres (19.9 mi) of the R7 between Bratislava and Holice. The contract also included construction of the D4 around Bratislava.

Construction began on 24 October 2016 with the ceremonial stone tapping in the presence of the Minister of Transport Árpád Érsek. The first two sections from the Bratislava-South intersection (D4xR7) to Holice were opened on the 19 July 2020. On 2 October 2021, the remaining section near Bratislava opened, a 6.3 kilometres (3.9 mi) long stretch from the D1 to the D4 along the Slovnaft oil refinery.

== Gallery ==
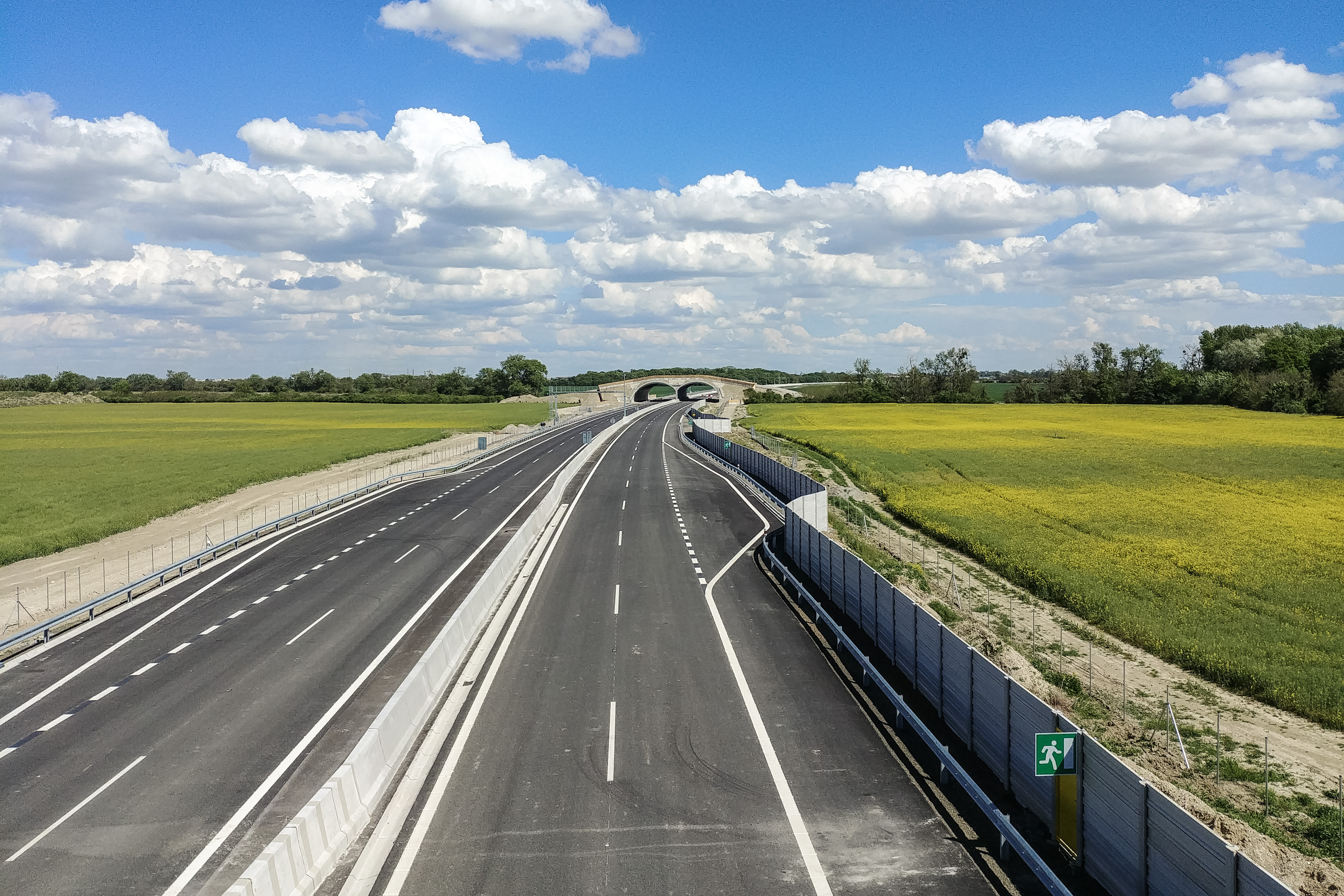
R7 expressway near D4 interchange Ketelec

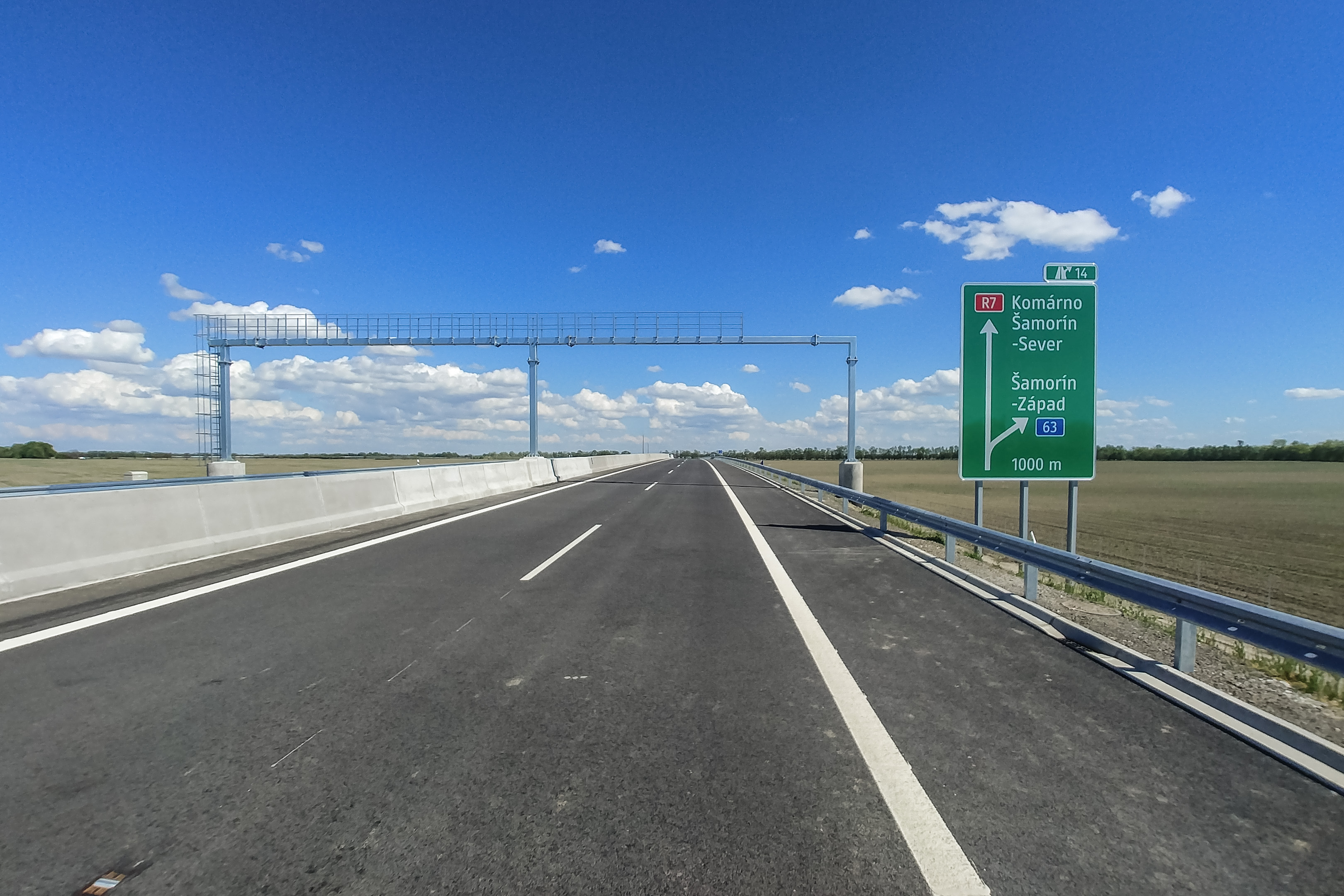
R7 expressway near Šamorín-Západ ramp

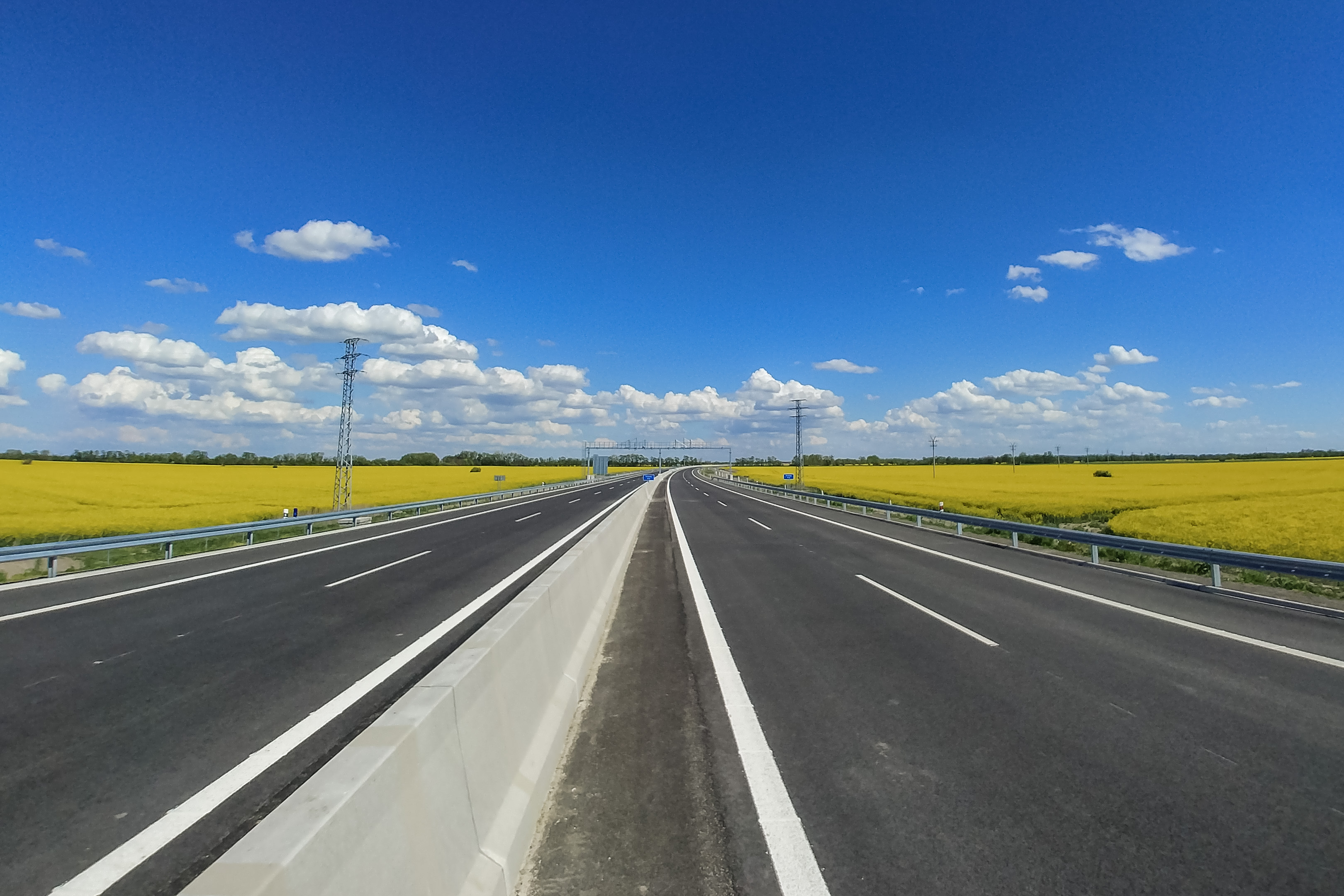
R7 expressway near Šamorín
