= Dunajské luhy Protected Landscape Area =

Protected landscape area of Slovakia

Dunajské luhy Protected Landscape Area CHKO Dunajské luhy
- IUCN category V (protected landscape/seascape)
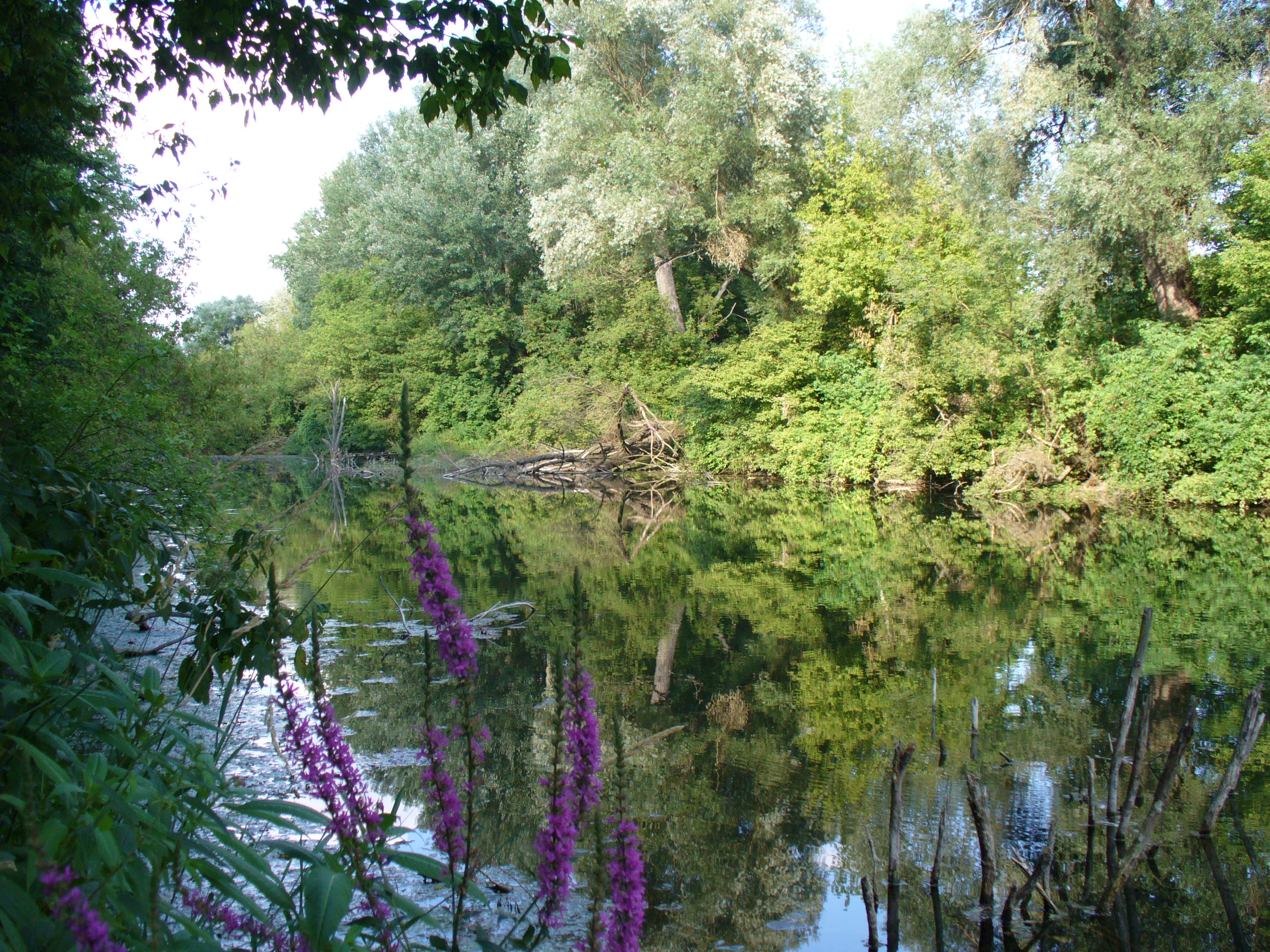
- Floodplains and forests near Bratislava's borough Podunajské Biskupice and the Senec District
- Interactive map of Dunajské luhy Protected Landscape Area; CHKO Dunajské luhy
- Location: South West Slovakia; Bratislava, Trnava and Nitra Regions
- Coordinates: 47°53′36″N 17°29′0″E
- Area: 122.84 km^{2} (47.43 sq mi)
- Established: 1 May 1998
- Governing body: Správa CHKO Dunajské luhy (CHKO Dunajské luhy Administration) in Dunajská Streda

Ramsar Wetland
- Official name: Dunajské luhy
- Designated: 26 May 1993
- Reference no.: 605

Dunajské luhy Protected Landscape Area (Slovak: Chránená krajinná oblasť Dunajské luhy; verbatim: Danube Floodplains PLA) is one of the youngest of the 14 protected landscape areas in Slovakia. The Landscape Area consists of five separate parts in the Danube Lowland, stretching from Bratislava in the north west, following the Danube and the borders between Slovakia and Hungary to a river island called Veľkolélsky ostrov in Komárno District. The biggest part is Žitný ostrov, the largest river island in Europe.

The area is situated in three regions – Bratislava, Trnava and Nitra. Altogether, it protects 122.84 km^{2} (47.43 mi^{2}) of floodplains, wetlands and numerous water bodies, such as lakes, oxbow lakes, ponds, and streams.

Dunajské luhy PLA contains diverse flora and fauna, including endemic species, living in riparian zones.

== Geography ==
The first part (farthest north) starts south of the Slovnaft oil refinery in south east Bratislava on the left side of the Danube, and it extends to the reservoir at the Čunovo waterworks. The second part is situated south west of the first one, on the right side of the Danube, near the boroughs of Rusovce and Čunovo. The third, largest part protects the island situated between the Danube and the border with Hungary. This area is protected almost entirely, except for the built up areas, the villages of Dobrohošť, Vojka nad Dunajom and Bodíky and the levee alongside the Danube. The fourth area, located on the right side of the Danube, starts at the village of Sap, borders the villages of Medveďov and Číčov and ends at the village of Klížska Nemá. The last fifth part is located on the Veľkolélsky ostrov island, which ends in the east near the village of Zlatná na Ostrove.

== Biology and ecology ==
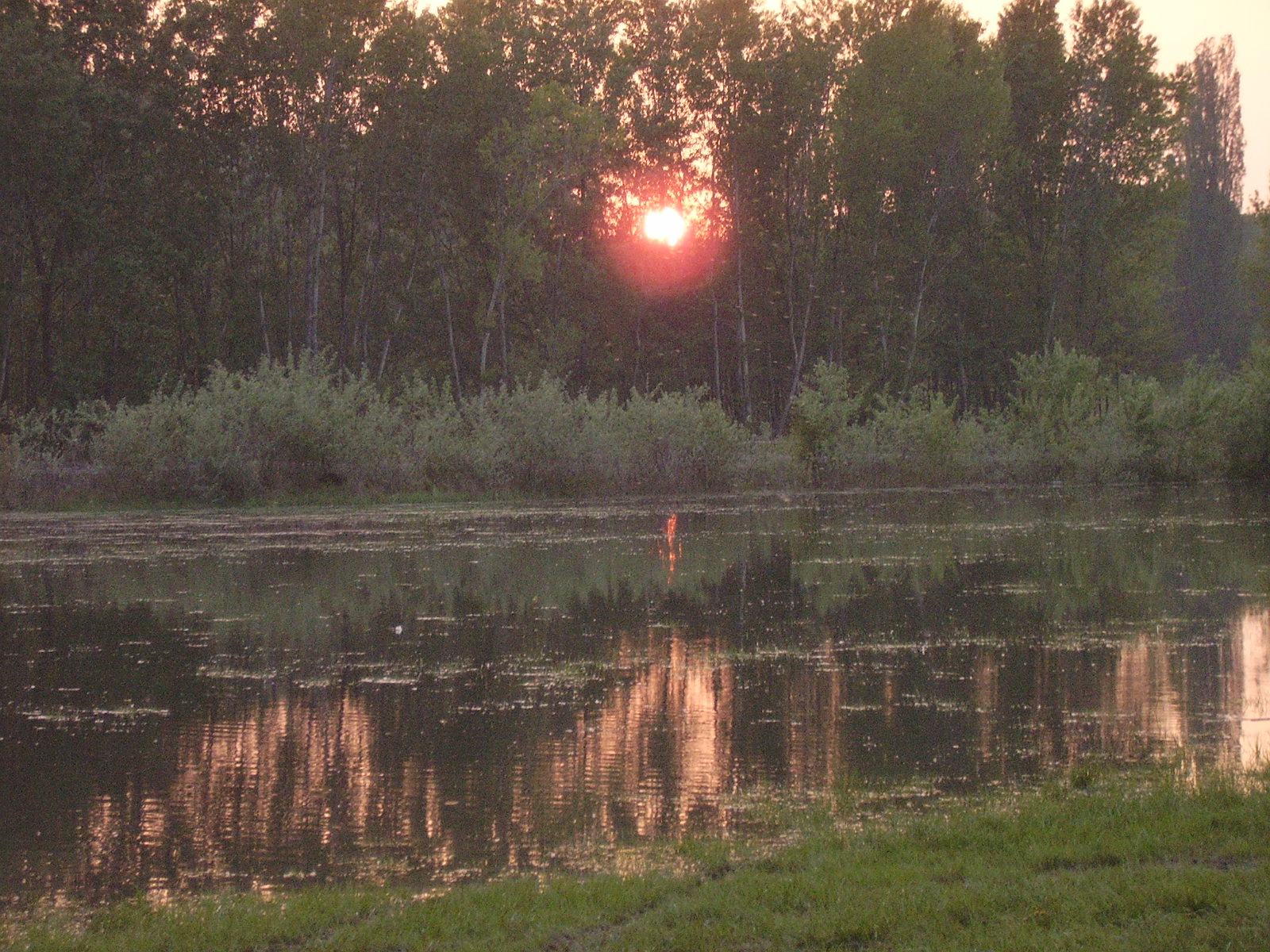
Sunset over the Danube wetlands

The whole area of the Dunajské luhy PLA is listed as the site number 605 in the Ramsar Convention, an international treaty for the conservation and sustainable utilization of wetlands.

=== Flora ===
Aquatic plants are represented by many rare and protected species, such as the European white waterlily, yellow water-lily, Salvinia natans, water chestnut, Nymphoides peltata and others. Meadows are home to orchids, for example, Orchis coriophora (bug orchid), Military orchid, green-winged orchid, Epipactis helleborine, lesser butterfly-orchid, and others. The floodplains are covered with willows, alders, oaks, ashes, elms, poplars, European hornbeams, and dogwoods.

=== Fauna ===
Fauna is also influenced by a wide variety of biotopes in the Landscape Area. For instance, it contains 109 species of molluscs, of which 22 are protected, hundreds of true bugs, for example the endemic species Thinobius korbeli from the rove beetles family. The tundra vole is one of the most notable little mammals living in this area.

Dunajské luhy PLA is an important area for nesting and incubation of many water birds. Many rare species, such as the white-tailed eagle, little egret and purple heron, nest there. The whole Slovak-Hungarian part of the Danube is listed as an Important Bird Area.

The Danube and surrounding bodies of water contain the highest number of species of fish in Slovakia. Rare and protected species include the wild form of the common carp, Umbra krameri (European mudminnow) from the order Esociformes, Pelecus cultratus from the family Cyprinidae, and Proterorhinus marmoratus (tubenose goby) from the goby family.

== Recreation ==
Recreational activities include swimming, fishing, hiking, and biking. The Danube Bike Trail situated on or at the Danube levee allows bicyclists to tour along the whole Landscape Area.

== Popular culture ==
The region features in Algernon Blackwood's novella "The Willows".

== See also ==
- Protected areas of Slovakia
- Tourism in Slovakia
