= D4 motorway (Slovakia) =

Motorway in Slovakia

D4 Motorway
- Diaľnica D4
- Completed Under construction Planned

Route information
- Part of E58
- Length: 48 km (30 mi) Completed: 32 km (20 mi); Planned: 16 km (9.9 mi)

Major junctions
- From: A6 border with Austria
- D2 Bratislava - Jarovce; R7 Bratislava - South; D1 Bratislava - East; D2 Stupava
- To: S8 border with Austria

Location
- Country: Slovakia
- Regions: Bratislava Region
- Major cities: Bratislava

Highway system
- Highways in Slovakia
← D3	→ D1

The D4 motorway (Slovak: Diaľnica D4) is a Slovak motorway which, when completed, will form the outer ring road around Bratislava, speed up access to motorway networks and partially reduce traffic on the road network in the catchment areas of Bratislava. The D4 is one of Europe's largest public-private partnership (PPP) projects.

For decades, there was only a short stretch from Austrian border at Jarovce to the junction with D2 (part of the former D61), construction of which started in 1996 and was opened in 1998.

Construction of various other parts started in the late 2010s, with several openings throughout 2020 and 2021. The extension to the motorway D1 in Bratislava is underway, in order to connect the southern bypass of Bratislava to the country's main traffic artery. The outer ring road also intersects with expressway R7; parts of which are already open as well. The motorway is toll-free with an exception for the section after the D2xD4 junction to the Austrian border.

== Chronology ==
The connecting motorway on the Austrian side, Nordost Autobahn A6 was opened on 19 November 2007. The highway connects the border with Slovakia to the Ost Autobahn A4. It provided connection to 3rd of its 5 neighboring country. Until 2007, Slovakia was connected by motorway only to the Czech Republic and Hungary.

In 2016, the construction began of the 27-kilometre-long (17 mi) motorway section from the D2xD4 junction near Jarovce to Bratislava, Rača. All the section was set to open in 2020, which was delayed due to construction problems. Therefore, only the Bratislava, South - Bratislava, Podunajské Biskupice and the Bratislava, Podunajské Biskupice - Bratislava, Vrakuňa sections were opened in 2020. The rest of the section opened in the fall of 2021. However, the D1/D4 Interchange was delayed by almost 5 years to June 2026 when it was finished and opened.

=== Future developments ===
Funded by a strategic investment, the Bratislava-Rača – Bratislava-Záhorská Bystrica 12.42-kilometre-long (7.72 mi) section is planned for future construction, including the twin-bore Karpaty tunnel at a length of 11.76-kilometre-long (7.31 mi). As of 2024, the planned construction start date is the fourth quarter of 2029 and the planned completion date is the second quarter of 2036.

The Karpaty tunnel would be the second longest of its type in Europe, and will take the new D4 motorway under the mountains. The tunnel will cost around €1-1.5bn.

== Route description ==
Country	Region	Location	km	mi	Exit	Name	Destinations	Notes
Slovakia	Bratislava Region	Bratislava Region	0	0.0	Austria-Slovakia border	Jarovce-Kittsee border crossing	A 6 E58	Kilometrage starting point Road continues as the Austrian A6
Slovakia	Bratislava Region	Bratislava Region	2	1.2	—	Bratislava-Jarovce	D2 E65 E75	
Slovakia	Bratislava Region	Bratislava Region	5	3.1	—	Bratislava-Petržalka	I/2	
Slovakia	Bratislava Region	Bratislava Region	9	5.6	—	Bratislava-juh	R7 E575	
Slovakia	Bratislava Region	Bratislava Region			Rest area	Rovinka		
Slovakia	Bratislava Region	Bratislava Region	14	8.7	—	Bratislava-Podunajské Biskupice	I/63	
Slovakia	Bratislava Region	Bratislava Region	18	11	—	Bratislava-Vrakuňa		
Slovakia	Bratislava Region	Bratislava Region	25	16	—	Bratislava Ivanka pri Dunaji	I/61	
Slovakia	Bratislava Region	Bratislava Region	26	16	—	Bratislava-východ	D1 E58 E75	
Slovakia	Bratislava Region	Bratislava Region	27	17	—	Čierna Voda		
Slovakia	Bratislava Region	Bratislava Region	30	19	—	Bratislava-Rača		Temporary end, Karpaty tunnel proposed
Slovakia	Bratislava Region	Bratislava Region	42	26	—	Bratislava-Záhorská Bystrica	I/2	Temporary start
Slovakia	Bratislava Region	Bratislava Region	44	27	—	Stupava	D2 E65	
Slovakia	Bratislava Region	Bratislava Region	45	28	—	Bratislava-Devínska Nová Ves		
Slovakia	Bratislava Region	Bratislava Region	48	30	Austria-Slovakia border	Devínska Nová Ves-Marchegg border crossing	S 8	Proposed Kilometrage end point Road continues as Austrian S8
1.000 mi = 1.609 km; 1.000 km = 0.621 mi: Proposed; Route transition; Unopened

== Gallery ==
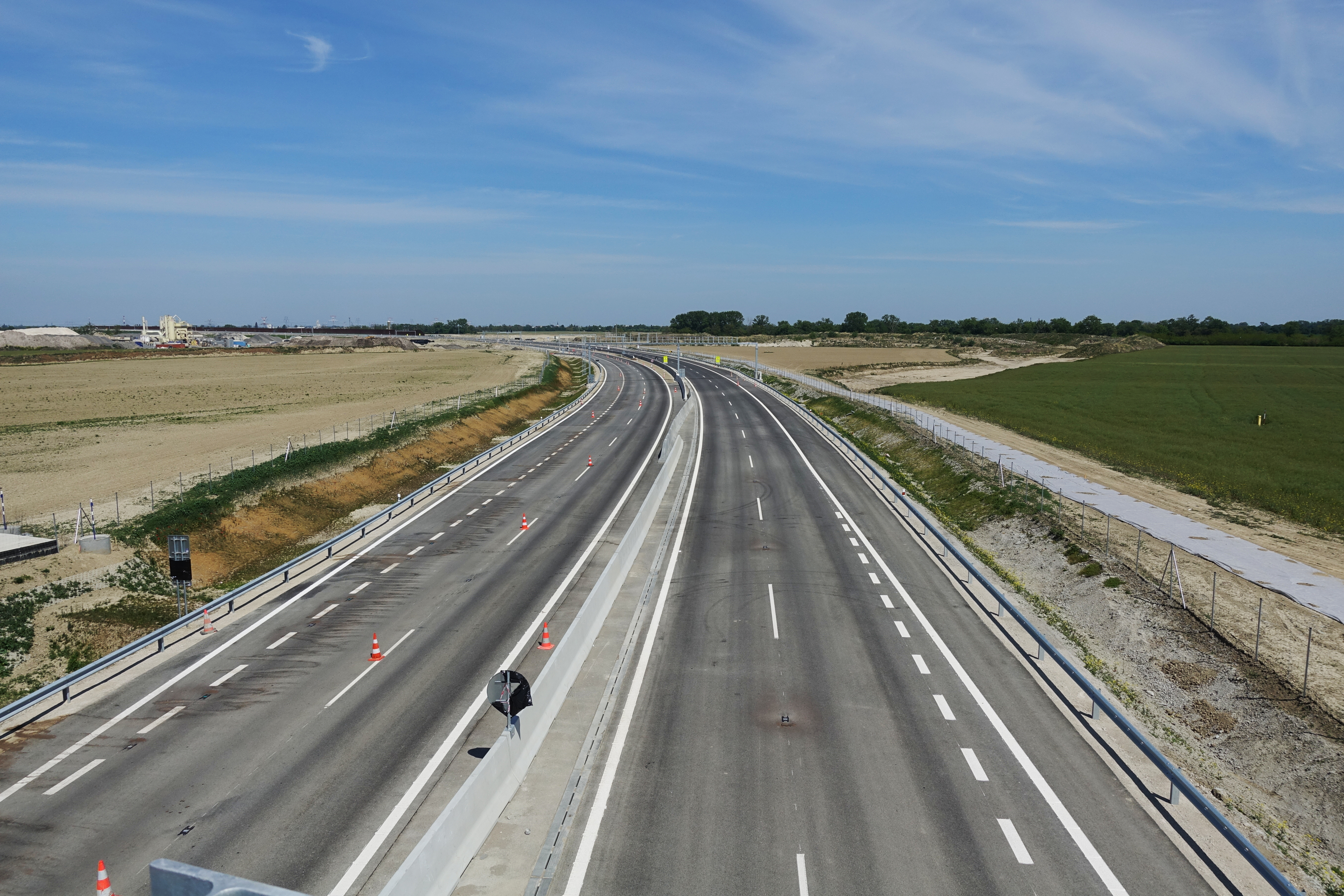
Almost finished motorway D4 in May 2020

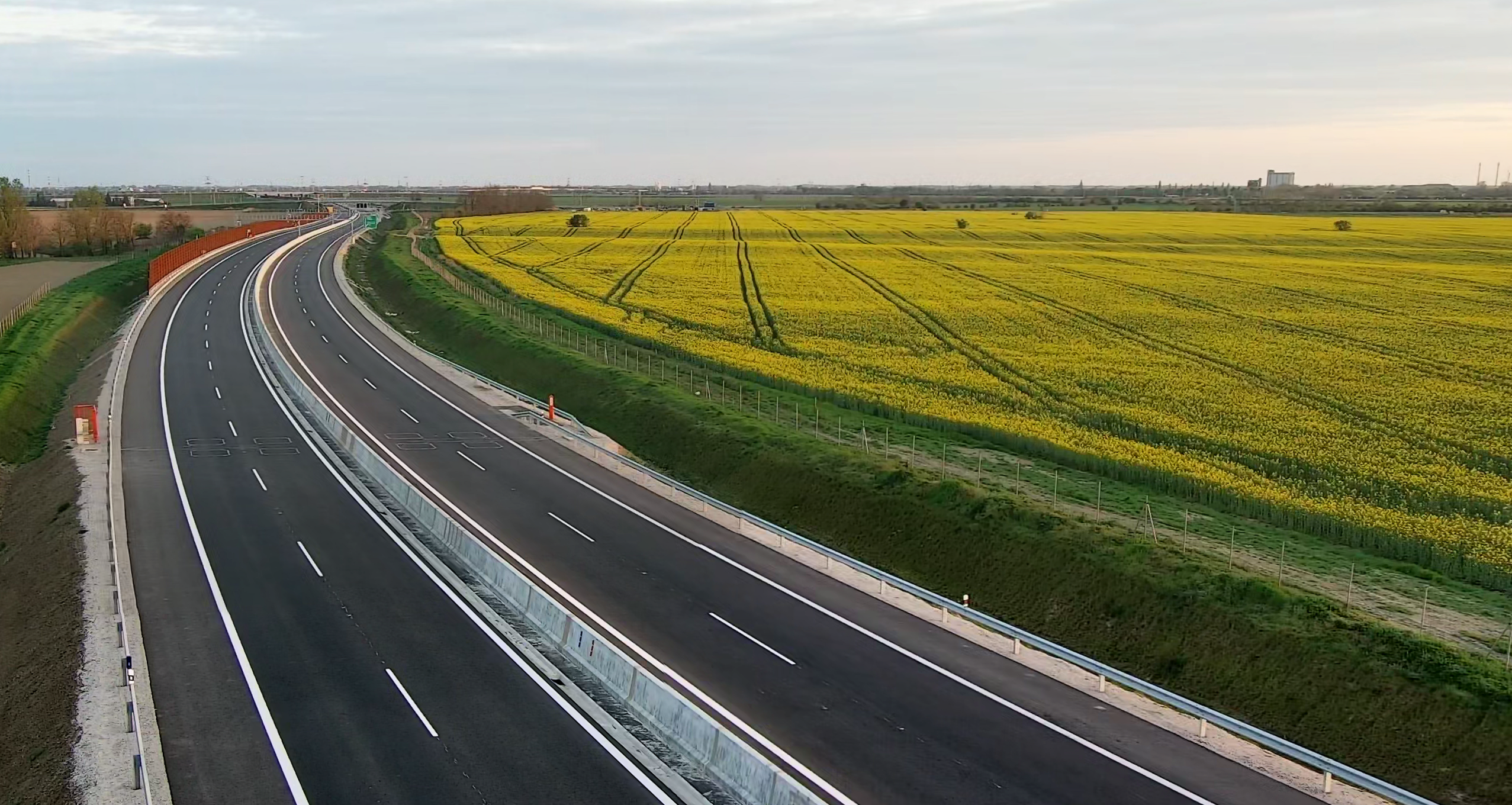
D4 near Zelená voda

== See also ==
- Transport in Bratislava
