= Sitina Tunnel =

Tunnel in Bratislava

Coordinates: 48°9′46.37″N 17°4′29.64″E

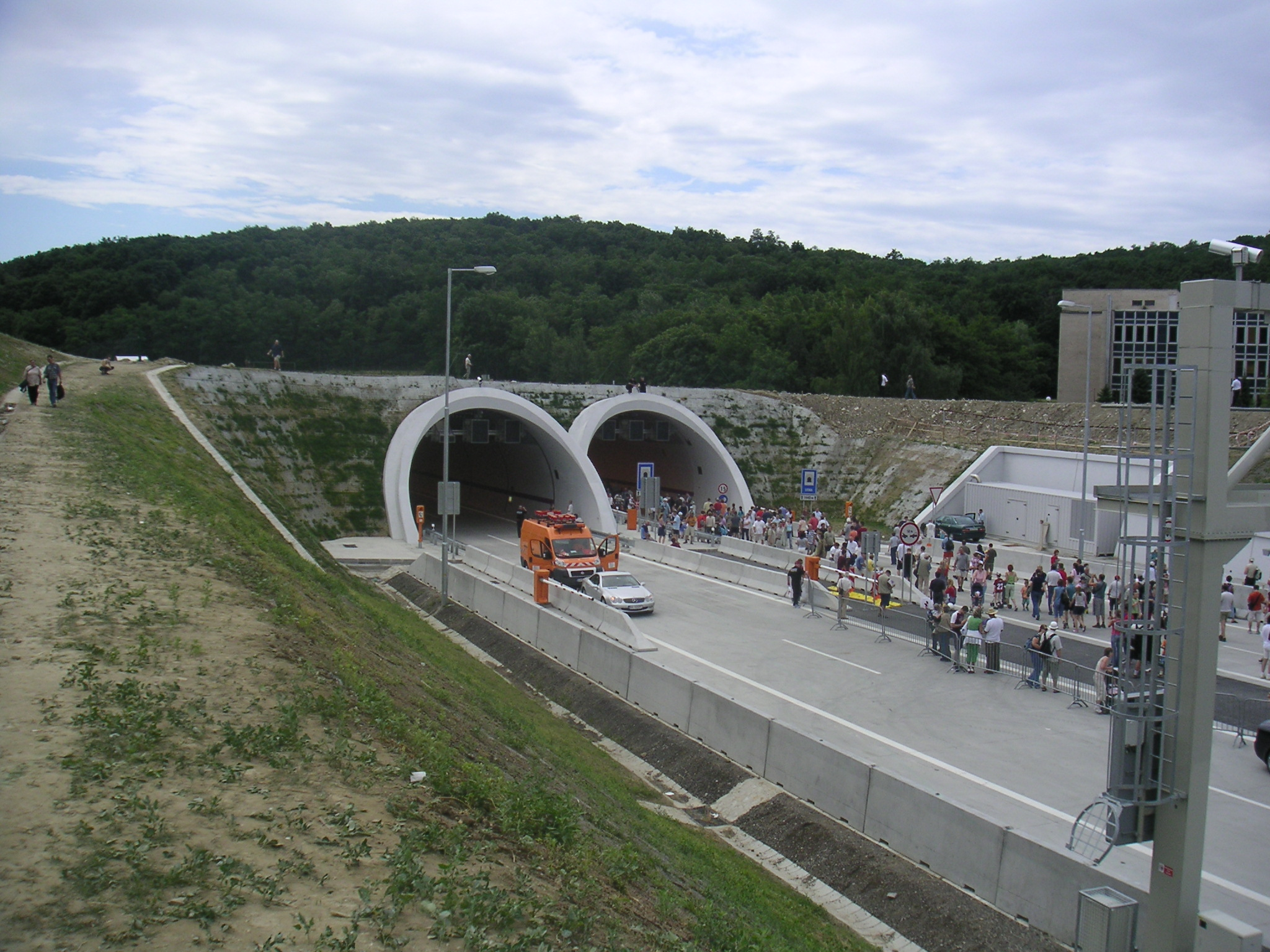
- Northern entrance to the tunnel, at the opening ceremony on 23 June 2007
- Interactive map of Sitina Tunnel

Overview
- Location: Bratislava
- Status: Open
- Route: D2 motorway

Operation
- Work began: 2003
- Constructed: 2003 - 2007
- Opened: June 24, 2007
- Owner: National Motorway Company
- Traffic: Automobile
- Toll: None
- Vehicles per day: 49,264 (2010)

Technical
- Length: 1,440 m (4,720 ft) (right tube); 1,415 m (4,642 ft) (left tube)
- No. of lanes: 4 (2 in each direction)
- Operating speed: 80 km/h (50 mph)
- Width: 7.5 m (25 ft)
- Grade: 2.34%

The Sitina Tunnel (alternatives Sitiny Tunnel or Františka Tunnel) is a motorway tunnel in Bratislava, Slovakia on the D2 motorway at the "Lamačská cesta - Staré grunty" section. The tunnel goes under the Little Carpathians forest. It is the first two-tube tunnel in Slovakia and by its opening, the entire D2 motorway in Slovakia was completed.

== Preparation and facts ==
The preparation works for both the tunnel and the motorway section began in the 1990s. The route had to be chosen; there were 3 variants:

- 1st variant suggested a motorway along the old road without tunnel
- 2nd variant suggested a shorter tunnel
- 3rd variant suggested a longer tunnel

After studying all the 3 variants, the variant with a shorter tunnel was selected, mainly for environmental reasons. The tunnel from that variant is 1440 m long for the western (right) tube, and 1415 m for the eastern (left) tube. The covered parts near the building of the Slovak Academy of Sciences are 206 m and 216 m long, respectively. The width of the road is 7.5 m, and features 1 m wide hard shoulders. The average gradient in the tunnel is 2.34%. The maximum allowed speed is 80 kilometres per hour (50 mph). The tunnels were built using New Austrian Tunnelling method (NATM).

Due to construction near built-up areas, several changes had to be made:

- Relocating entrance gate to the Bratislava Zoo, to enable building of the access road
- Demolishing some buildings to make way for the motorway and the objects associated with it
- Rebuilding existing roads at both ends, to enable building access roads and interchanges and connecting them to the tunnel
- Rebuilding some other streets
- Other changes like relocation of electrical wires

The planned costs of the tunnel and of the entire section are 3.5 billions SKK (app. €98.75 mill.), but the final costs have risen to 4.5 billions SKK. 18% of that are paid from the state budget and the rest from a loan provided by the Japan Bank for International Cooperation (JBIC).

== Construction ==
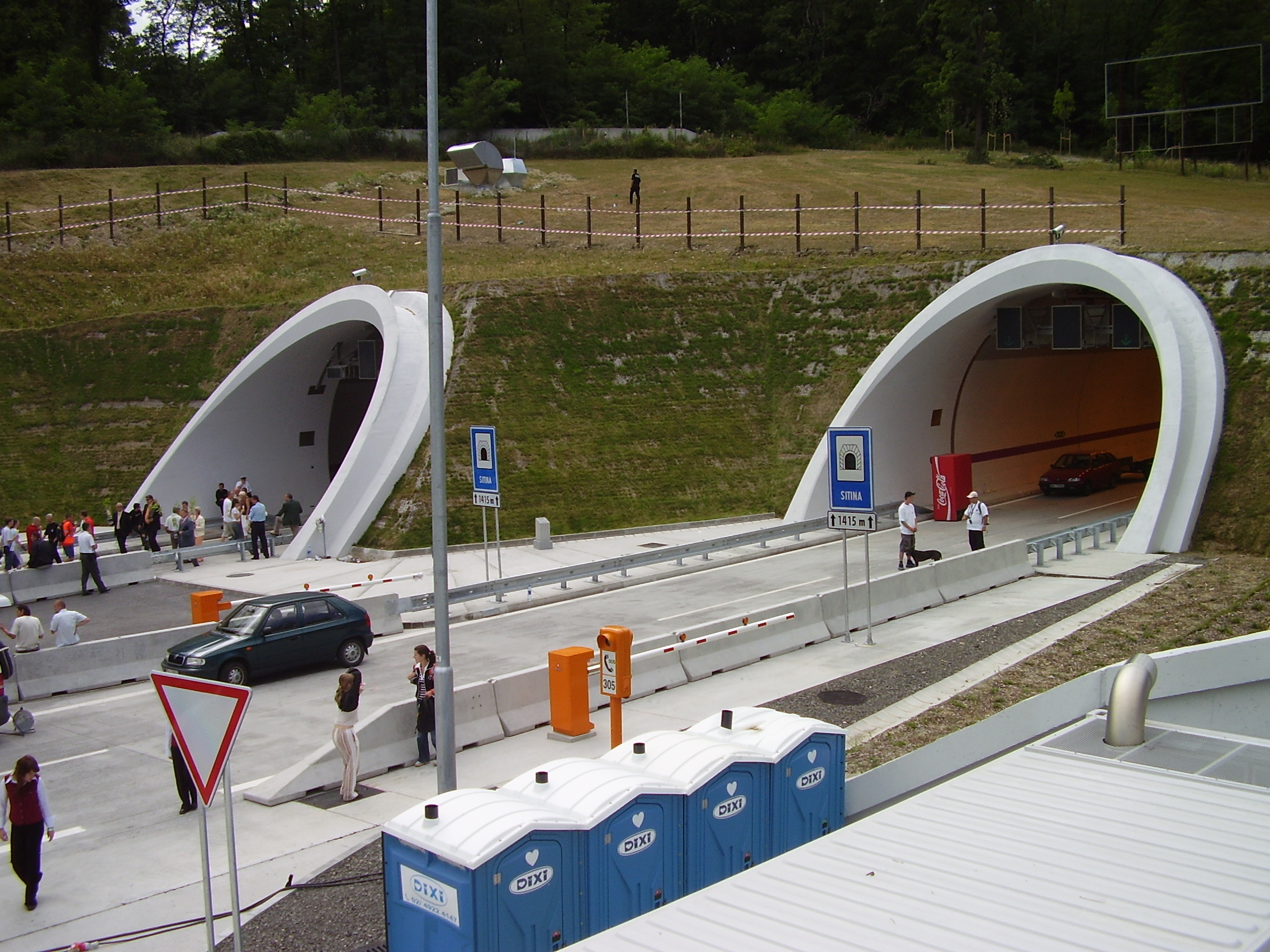
Southern entrance to the tunnel, at the opening ceremony on 23 June 2007

In May 2003, construction works began at the motorway section, and in October 2003, works were launched at the tunnel itself by driving from the southeastern portal. In summer 2004, driving began from the northwestern portal as well. Driving was a bit slower than expected due to damaged geological zones, in which stronger lining had to be made. The breakthrough for the western tube was made on February 8, 2005 and for the eastern tube on May 3, 2005. The construction works were finished in December 2005 and technological works followed. The technology testing took place in the first half of year 2007. The tunnel was opened for traffic on 24 June 2007, with a ceremonial opening taking place on 23 June 2007, which included a ride through the tunnel by Formula One car, driven by David Coulthard.
