= Ivanka North Junction =

Motorway junction in Slovakia

- D1/D4 Interchange
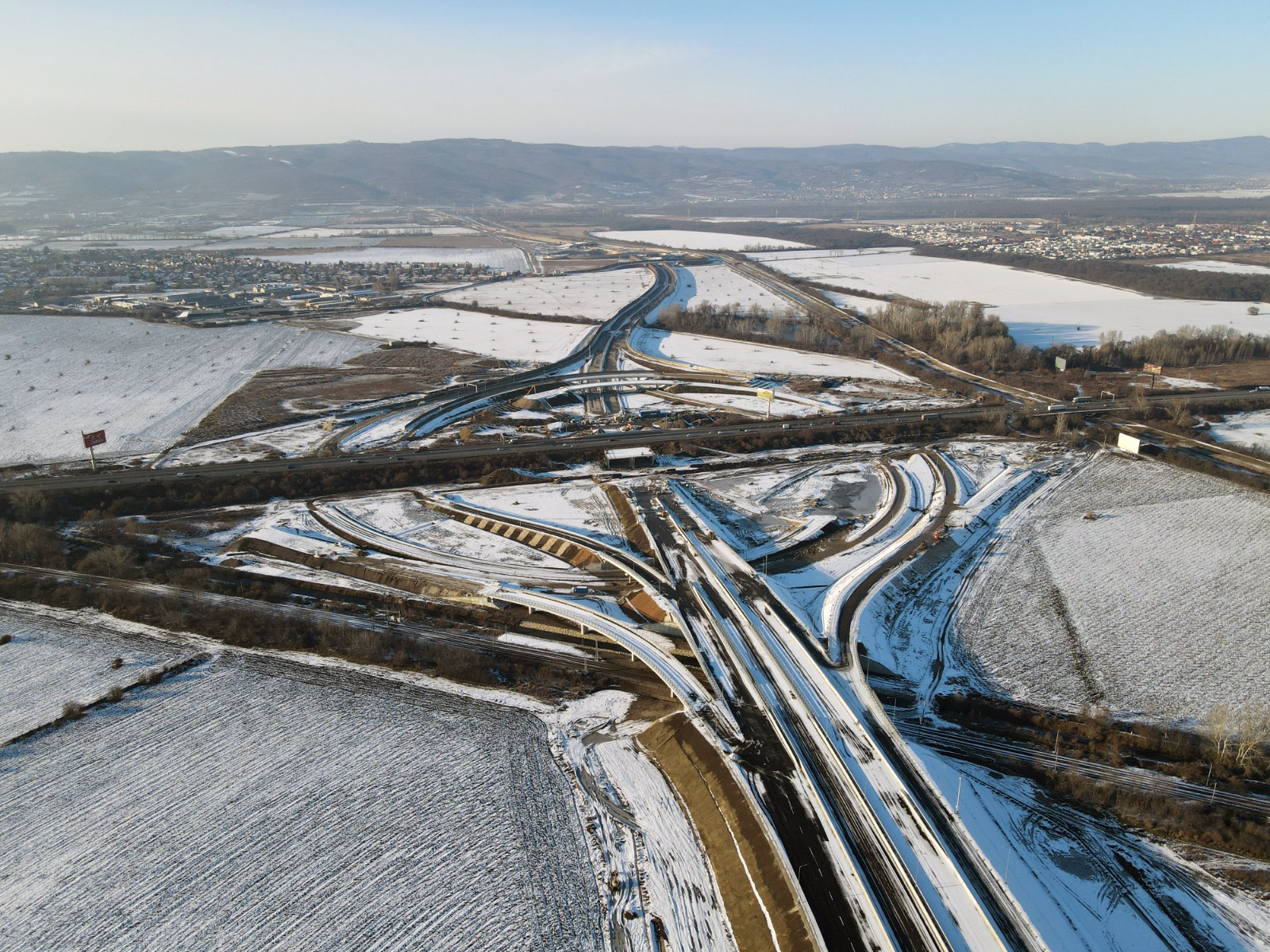
- The D1/D4 Interchange in 2021
- Interactive map of Ivanka North Junction

Location
- Bratislava Region
- Coordinates: 48.200223°N 17.229506°E
- Roads at junction: D1; D4

Construction
- Type: Interchange
- Constructed: 2022–2026 by Budimex
- Opened: 22 June 2026
- Maintained by: National Motorway Company
- Tolls: None, no vignette required

The D1/D4 Interchange (officially referred to as the Ivanka North Junction) (Note: Slovak: križovatka D1/D4, officially križovatka Ivanka sever) is a motorway junction located in the Bratislava Region in Slovakia. It connects the D1 motorway with the D4 motorway and it is one of the most complex motorway junctions in the country. The interchange was included within the reconstruction project of the 3.6-kilometre-long (2.2 mi) D1 segment between the junctions of Vajnory and Triblavina.

After multiple delays and issues spanning across six years, the construction of the interchange officially began in 2022. During the construction, parts of the interchange started being opened, which led to a redirection of transit traffic to the D4 bypass. The interchange, along with all of its branches, was finished on 21 June 2026 and subsequently opened for traffic on the next day. The opening also marked the completion of the reconstruction project.

== Branches ==
The D1/D4 Interchange consists of a total of eight branches (slip roads). The first branch, which was put into operation, was the Jarovce–Trnava slip road which was opened on 24 November 2024. In the same month, the slip road from Trnava to Rača was also opened. The Zlaté Piesky–Jarovce slip road was put into operation on 13 May 2025, with the Trnava–Jarovce slip road being opened in the following month on 21 June 2025. On 14 May 2026, the Rača–Trnava slip road was opened and the three remaining branches were put into operation on 21 June 2026.

Statuses of the branches as of 21 June 2026.
| From | To | Status |
|---|---|---|
| Trnava | Rača | In operation since 30 November 2024 |
| Trnava | Jarovce | In operation since 21 June 2025 |
| Zlaté Piesky | Jarovce | In operation since 13 May 2025 |
| Jarovce | Trnava | In operation since 24 November 2024 |
| Zlaté Piesky | Rača | In operation since 21 June 2026 |
| Rača | Trnava | In operation since 14 May 2026 |
| Rača | Zlaté Piesky | In operation since 21 June 2026 |
| Jarovce | Zlaté Piesky | In operation since 21 June 2026 |
