= Bratislava 5 =

Coordinates: 48.064115°N 17.113473°E

Bratislava V District
- District
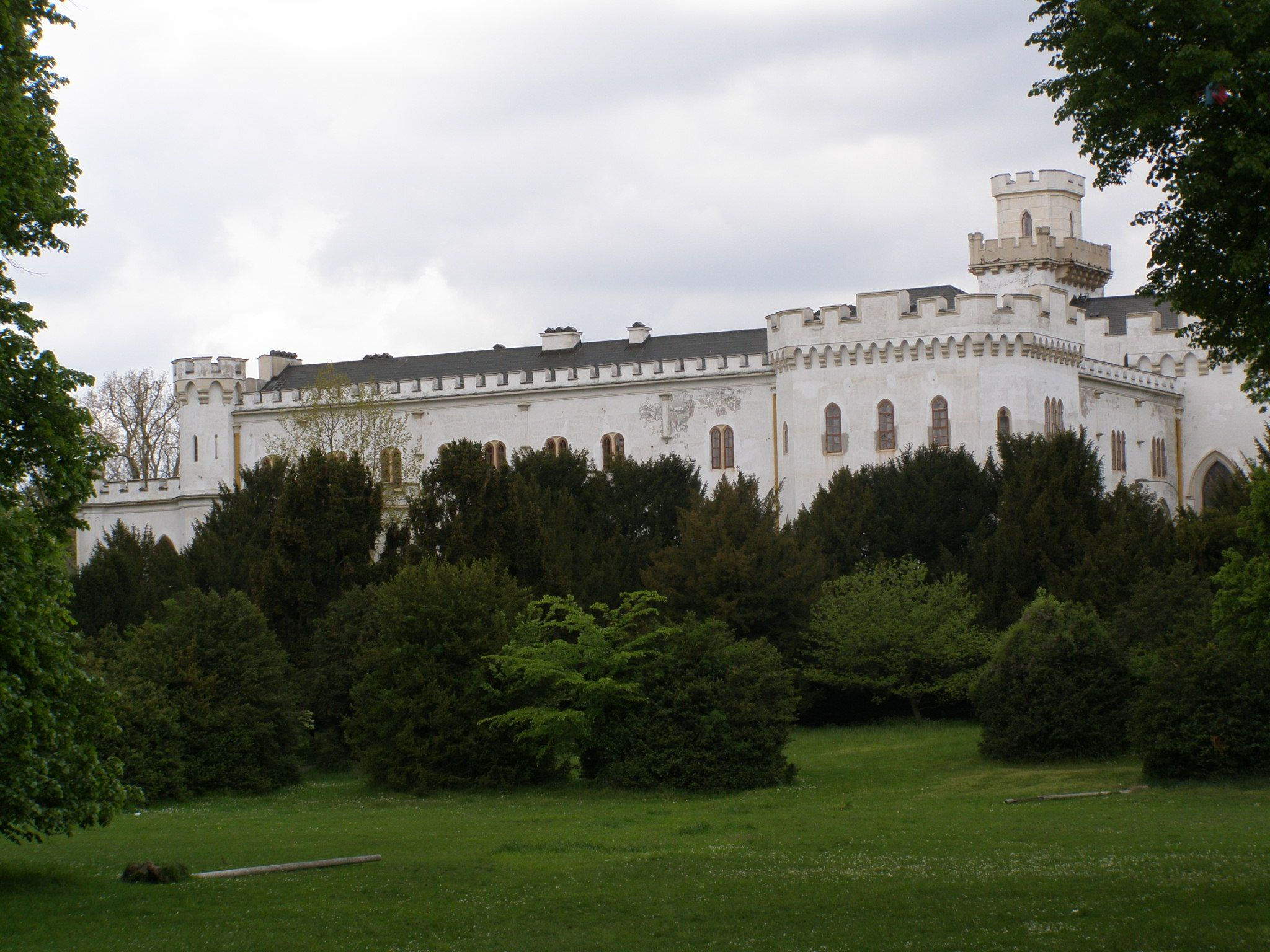
- Country: Slovakia
- Region (kraj): Bratislava Region
- Seat: Bratislava

Area
  - Total: 94.20 km^{2} (36.37 sq mi)

Population (2025)
  - Total: 121,698
- Time zone: UTC+1 (CET)
  - Summer (DST): UTC+2 (CEST)
- Telephone prefix: 02
- Vehicle registration plate (until 2022): BA, BL, BT, BD, BE, BI
- Boroughs: 4

Bratislava V (Slovak: okres Bratislava V; Hungarian: Pozsonyi V. járás) is an okres (district) of Bratislava in the Bratislava Region of Slovakia. It covers southern areas of Bratislava, including the boroughs of Petržalka, Jarovce, Rusovce and Čunovo. It is bordered by the Danube river to the north and east, which forms its borders with the Bratislava IV, Bratislava I, Bratislava II and Senec districts. The district borders on Hungary in the south and Austria in the west.

Until 1920, the northern part of the district was part of the Hungarian county of Pozsony, while the southern part was part of the county of Moson. It is the only Slovak district which is situated on the right bank of the Danube.

== Population ==
Historical population
Year	Pop.	±%
1980	52,690	—
1991	131,950	+150.4%
2001	121,259	−8.1%
2011	111,135	−8.3%
2021	122,729	+10.4%
Source: Censuses

Population statistic (10 years)
Year	1995	2005	2015	2025
Count	130,288	119,171	110,888	121,698
Difference		−8.53%	−6.95%	+9.74%

Population statistic
Year	2024	2025
Count	121,843	121,698
Difference		−0.11%

It has a population of 121,698 people (31 December 2025).

=== Ethnicity ===
Census 2021 (1+ %)
Ethnicity	Number	Fraction
Slovak	107,438	84.09%
Not found out	10,318	8.07%
Hungarian	3745	2.93%
Czech	1796	1.4%
Total	127,755	

In year 2021 was 127,755 people by ethnicity 107,438 as Slovak, 10,318 as Not found out, 3745 as Hungarian, 1796 as Czech, 948 as Other, 550 as Croatian, 509 as Rusyn, 371 as Russian, 338 as German, 314 as Ukrainian, 194 as Romani, 164 as Polish, 129 as Serbian, 112 as Jewish, 106 as Moravian, 100 as Austrian, 99 as Bulgarian, 96 as French, 95 as Italian, 61 as Albanian, 44 as Romanian, 43 as Chinese, 39 as Greek, 27 as Irish, 27 as Canadian, 26 as English, 24 as Vietnamese, 21 as Turkish, 15 as Silesian and 6 as Korean.

Note on population: The difference values of population numbers in the table "Population statistic" and in the sections "Ethnicity" & "Religion" is caused by the use of various statistical methods.

=== Religion ===
Census 2021 (1+ %)
Religion	Number	Fraction
None	54,622	44.51%
Roman Catholic Church	47,130	38.4%
Not found out	10,370	8.45%
Evangelical Church	4564	3.72%
Greek Catholic Church	1420	1.16%
Total	122,729	

In year 2021 was 122,729 people by religion 54,622 from None, 47,130 from Roman Catholic Church, 10,370 from Not found out, 4564 from Evangelical Church, 1420 from Greek Catholic Church, 605 from Other, 586 from Ad hoc movements, 562 from Eastern Orthodox Church, 472 from Calvinist Church, 323 from Jehovah's Witnesses, 313 from Christian Congregations in Slovakia, 308 from Other and not ascertained christian church, 308 from Buddhism, 204 from Islam, 159 from Apostolic Church, 143 from Baptists Church, 138 from Church of the Brethren, 130 from Paganism and natural spirituality, 105 from Jewish community, 67 from Seventh-day Adventist Church, 60 from United Methodist Church, 46 from Hinduism, 41 from Old Catholic Church, 25 from Czechoslovak Hussite Church, 16 from Bahá'i Community, 10 from Church of Jesus Christ of Latter-day Saints and 2 from New Apostolic Church.

== Boroughs ==
Borough	Area [km^{2}]	Population
Čunovo	18.62	1,830
Jarovce	21.34	3,246
Petržalka	28.68	112,118
Rusovce	25.55	4,504

Population and area values are current for year 2025.
