= D2 motorway (Czech Republic) =

Czech motorway

D2 Motorway
- Dálnice D2

Route information
- Part of E65
- Length: 61 km (38 mi)

Major junctions
- From: D1 near Brno
- D55 near Břeclav (planned)
- To: D2 border with Slovakia near Lanžhot

Location
- Country: Czech Republic
- Regions: South Moravian
- Major cities: Brno

Highway system
- Highways in the Czech Republic
← D1	→ D3

D2 motorway (Czech: Dálnice D2) links Brno to the border with Slovakia where it continues as D2 motorway (Slovakia) towards Bratislava. The entire length of the motorway is part of European route E65.

== History ==
Plans for the motorway existed since early 1950s. In 1958, it was decided to prepare for the resumption of motorway construction, with plans to build a motorway linking Prague, Brno and Bratislava. The D2 motorway became part of the network of motorways and expressways in 1963 with the adoption of the concept of long-term development of the road network and local roads.

Construction on the D2 highway began in 1974; the first 11 kilometers (6.8 mi) opened in 1978. The last part of the motorway opened in 1980, when it was 141 km (88 mi) long. After the 1993 dissolution of Czechoslovakia, 61 km (38 mi) of the motorway remain in Czech Republic, with 80 km (50 mi) remaining in Slovakia.

== Features ==
Point	Coordinates (links to map & photo sources)
City of Brno	49.162402°N 16.632129°E
Village of Starovičky	48.909380°N 16.780531°E
Border with Slovakia at the Morava river	48.686175°N 16.987238°E

== Images ==
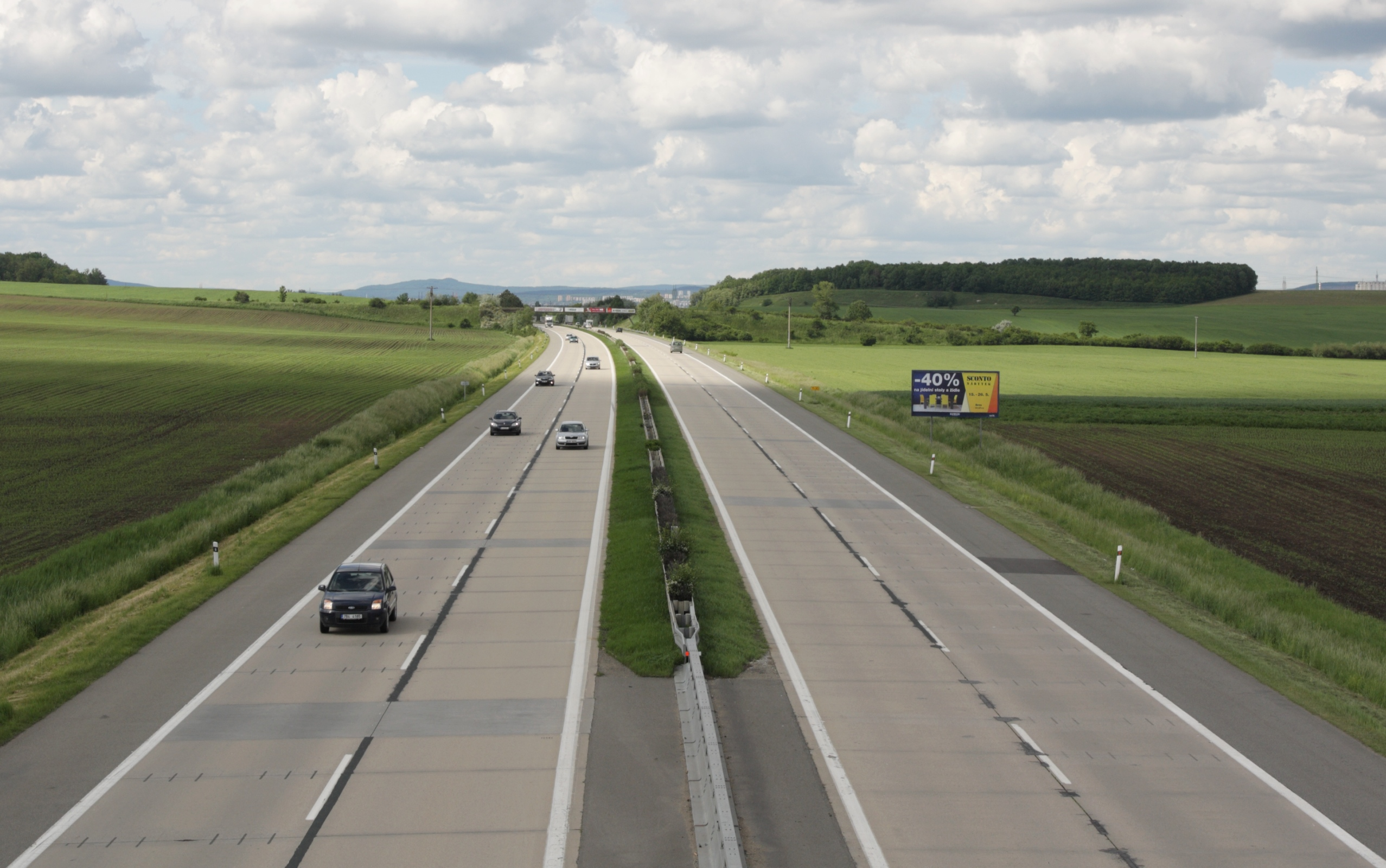
D2 motorway near Blučina

== Route description ==
Country	Region	Location	km	mi	Exit	Name	Destinations	Notes
Czech Republic	South Moravian Region	South Moravian Region	0	0.0	—	Začátek dálnice	I/41	Kilometrage starting point
Czech Republic	South Moravian Region	South Moravian Region	1	0.62	—	Brno-jih	D1 E50 E65 E462	
Czech Republic	South Moravian Region	South Moravian Region	3	1.9	—	Chrlice		
Czech Republic	South Moravian Region	South Moravian Region	11	6.8	—	Blučina		
Czech Republic	South Moravian Region	South Moravian Region			Rest area	Odpočívka Zeleňák		
Czech Republic	South Moravian Region	South Moravian Region	25	16	—	Hustopeče		
Czech Republic	South Moravian Region	South Moravian Region			Rest area	Odpočívka Starovičky		
Czech Republic	South Moravian Region	South Moravian Region	41	25	—	Podivín		
Czech Republic	South Moravian Region	South Moravian Region			Rest area	Odpočívka Ladná		
Czech Republic	South Moravian Region	South Moravian Region	48	30	—	Břeclav		
Czech Republic	South Moravian Region	South Moravian Region			Rest area	Odpočívka Lanžhot		
Czech Republic	South Moravian Region	South Moravian Region	61	38	—	Břeclav–Brodské border crossing	D2 E65	Kilometrage end point Border with Slovakia; road continues as the Slovak D2
1.000 mi = 1.609 km; 1.000 km = 0.621 mi: Route transition
