= Rusovce =

Borough in Slovakia

- Borough
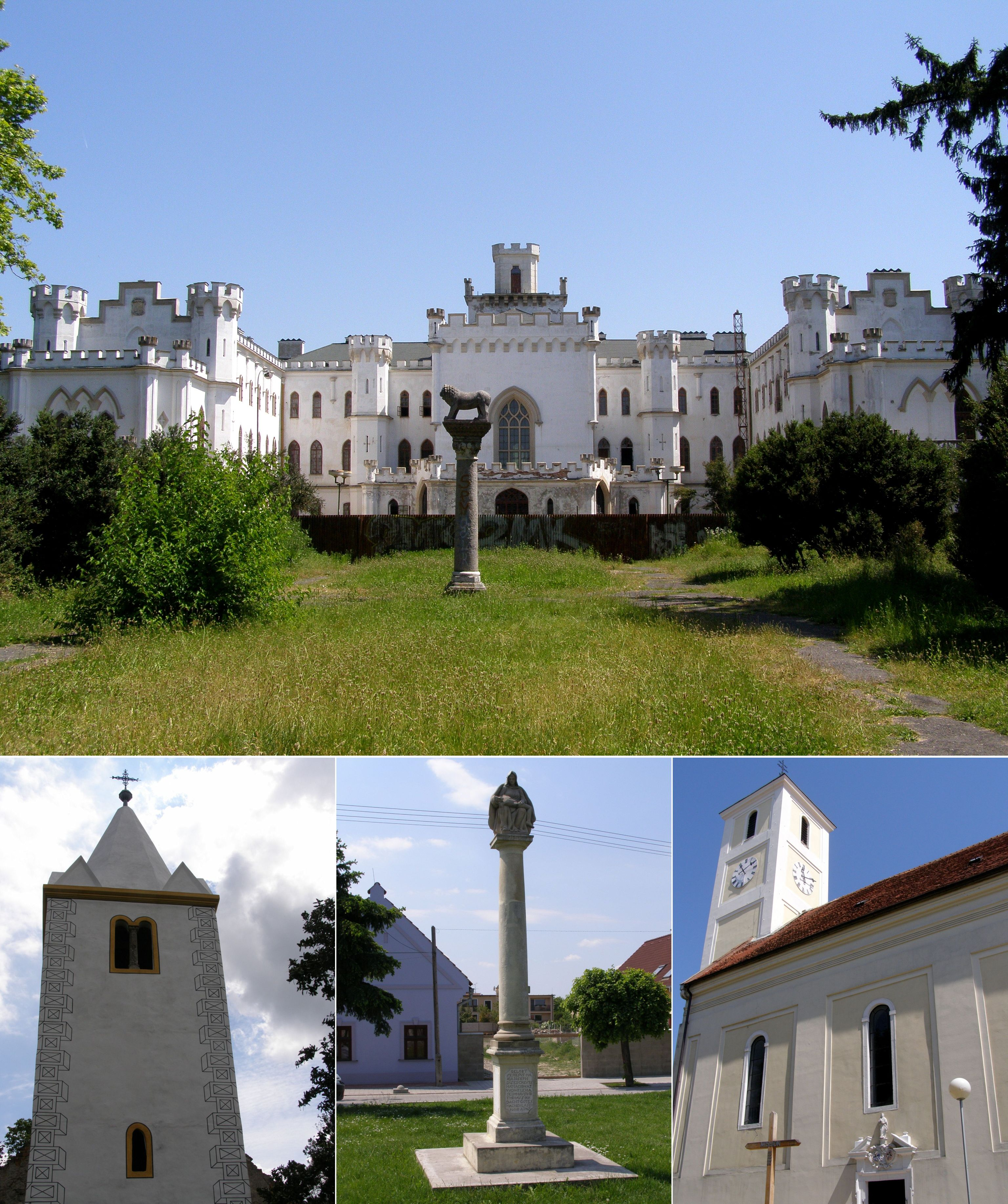
- Top: Rusovce Mansion, bottom: St. Vitus Church, Column with Pietà, St. Mary Magdalene Church

- Flag Coat of arms

- Area of Rusovce in Bratislava

- Location of Rusovce in the Bratislava Region Location of Rusovce in Slovakia
- Coordinates: 48°3′13″N 17°8′52″E
- Country: Slovakia
- Region: Bratislava Region
- District: Bratislava V
- First mentioned: 1208 (Julian)

Government
  - Mayor: Radovan Jenčík

Area
  - Total: 25.55 km^{2} (9.86 sq mi)
- Elevation: 133 m (436 ft)

Population (2025)
  - Total: 4,504
- Time zone: UTC+1 (CET)
  - Summer (DST): UTC+2 (CEST)
- Postal code: 851 10
- Area code: +421-2
- Vehicle registration plate (until 2022): BA, BL, BT
- Website: www.bratislava-rusovce.sk

Rusovce (Hungarian: Oroszvár, Croatian: Rosvar, German: Karlburg, Rossenburg, Kerchenburg) is a borough in southern Bratislava on the right bank of the Danube river, close to the Austrian border.

== Geography ==
The municipality lies at an altitude of 133 metres (436 ft) and covers an area of 25.55 km^{2} (9.86 sq mi) (2025).

== History ==
In the 1st century, there was a Roman settlement named Gerulata in today's Rusovce area. The first preserved written reference to the settlement is from 1208.

In 1910 Oroszvár had 1,802 inhabitants. Among them were 1,268 Germans, 439 Hungarians, 30 Slovaks, 20 Croats and 39 Others. It remained Hungarian after 1920 but became a border village close to Austria and Czechoslovakia. The German inhabitants were expelled after 1945.

On 15 October 1947, together with Čunovo and Jarovce, Rusovce was annexed by Czechoslovakia according to the Paris Peace Treaty, in order to make possible to divert the Danube. On 1 January 1972 it was made a borough of Bratislava.

== Transport ==
A motorway and road border crossings into Hungary are located in Rusovce. Across the border is Rajka in Győr-Moson-Sopron County. There are no more border checks at both crossings from 21 December 2007, with Hungary and Slovakia joining the Schengen Area.

== Population ==
Population statistic (10 years)
Year	1995	2005	2015	2025
Count	1697	2163	3610	4504
Difference		+27.46%	+66.89%	+24.76%

Population statistic
Year	2024	2025
Count	4505	4504
Difference		−0.02%

It has a population of 4504 people (31 December 2025).

=== Ethnicity ===
Census 2021 (1+ %)
Ethnicity	Number	Fraction
Slovak	3864	88.05%
Hungarian	280	6.38%
Not found out	230	5.24%
Czech	61	1.39%
Other	52	1.18%
Total	4388	

In year 2021 was 4388 people by ethnicity 3864 as Slovak, 280 as Hungarian, 230 as Not found out, 61 as Czech, 52 as Other, 36 as German, 13 as Croatian, 12 as Rusyn, 12 as Russian, 11 as Ukrainian, 9 as Austrian, 8 as Bulgarian, 7 as Italian, 7 as French, 5 as Jewish, 5 as English, 4 as Romani, 4 as Polish, 3 as Irish, 3 as Serbian, 3 as Korean, 2 as Turkish, 1 as Vietnamese, 1 as Romanian and 1 as Canadian.

Note on population: The difference values of population numbers in the table "Population statistic" and in the sections "Ethnicity" & "Religion" is caused by the use of various statistical methods.

=== Religion ===
Census 2021 (1+ %)
Religion	Number	Fraction
None	1924	43.85%
Roman Catholic Church	1860	42.39%
Not found out	221	5.04%
Evangelical Church	177	4.03%
Greek Catholic Church	67	1.53%
Total	4388	

In year 2021 was 4388 people by religion 1924 from None, 1860 from Roman Catholic Church, 221 from Not found out, 177 from Evangelical Church, 67 from Greek Catholic Church, 21 from Eastern Orthodox Church, 18 from Calvinist Church, 16 from Other, 12 from Christian Congregations in Slovakia, 12 from Baptists Church, 11 from Ad hoc movements, 9 from Other and not ascertained christian church, 7 from Jewish community, 7 from Church of the Brethren, 6 from Apostolic Church, 5 from Paganism and natural spirituality, 5 from Jehovah's Witnesses, 3 from Islam, 3 from Buddhism, 2 from Hinduism, 1 from United Methodist Church and 1 from Bahá'i Community.

== Tourism ==
Main sights include the ruins of the Roman military camp Gerulata, part of Limes Romanus, and Rusovce mansion built in the 19th century in the Neogothic style, located in the English park. Currently, it is closed to public.

Dunajské luhy Protected Landscape Area comprises some parts of the borough and is located east of the municipality.

== Gallery ==
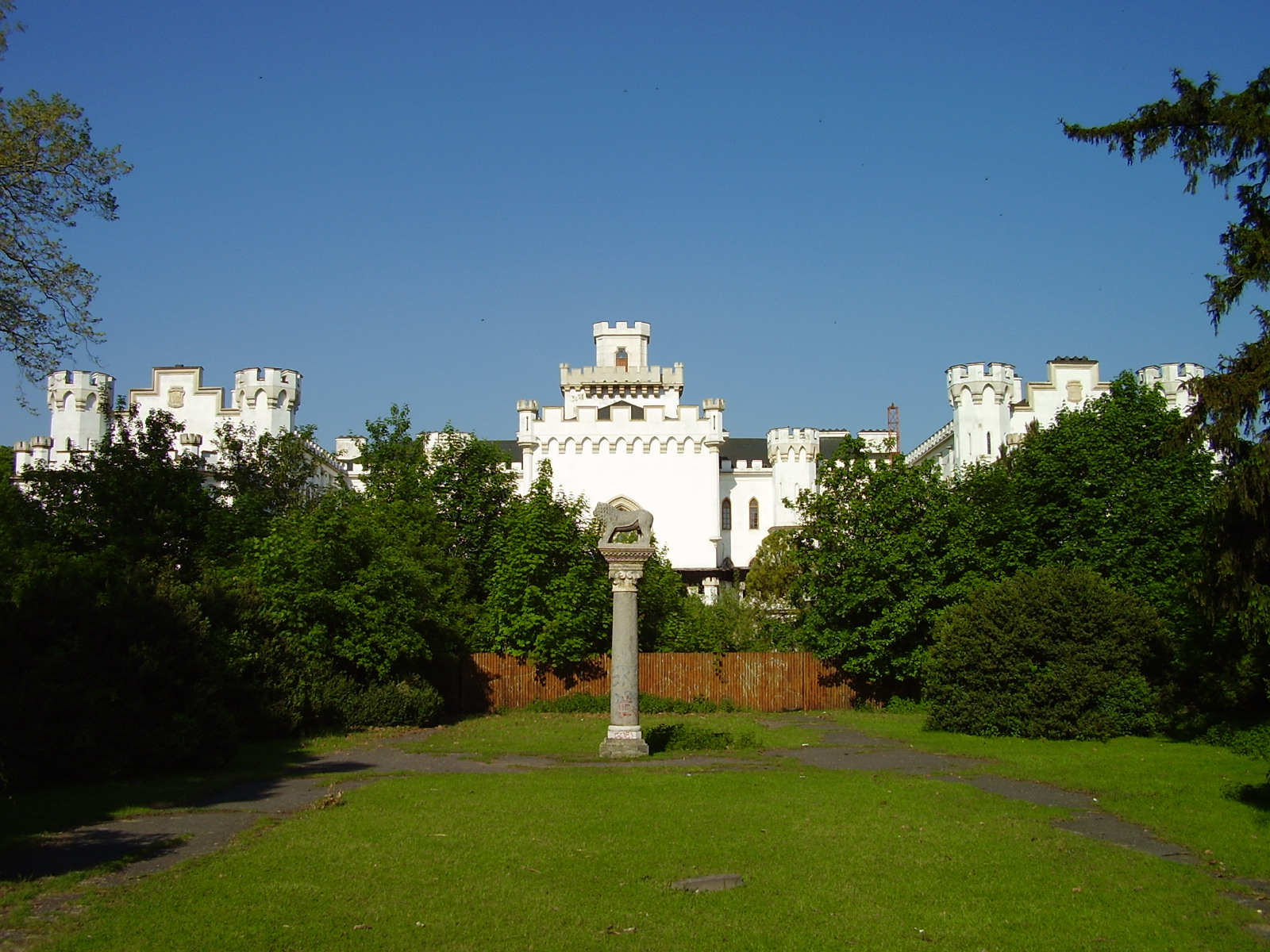
Rusovce mansion

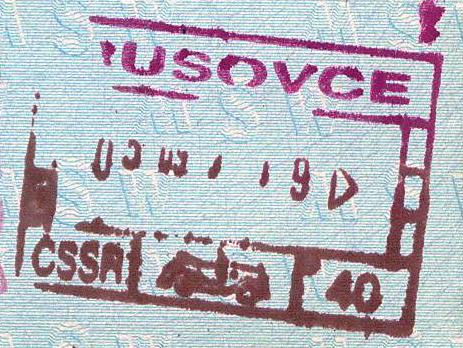
Old Czechoslovak passport stamp from Rusovce.
