= Čunovo =

- Borough
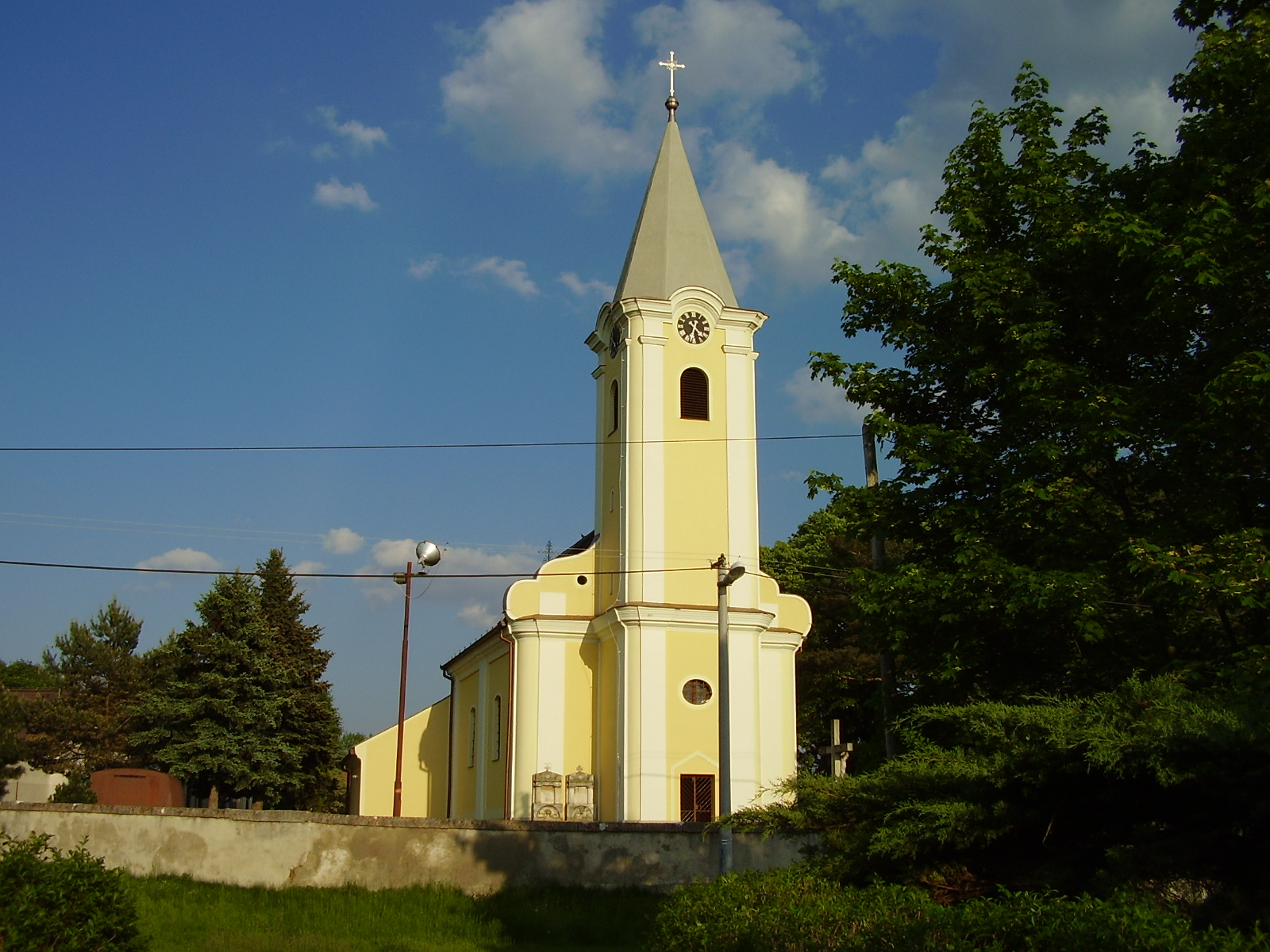
- Local baroque church, built in the 18th century

- Coat of arms

- Area of Čunovo in Bratislava
- Interactive map of Čunovo
- Location of Čunovo in the Bratislava Region Location of Čunovo in Slovakia
- Coordinates: 48°01′47″N 17°11′56″E
- Country: Slovakia
- Region: Bratislava Region
- District: Bratislava V
- First mentioned: 1232 (Julian)

Government
  - Mayor: Gabriela Ferenčáková

Area
  - Total: 18.62 km^{2} (7.19 sq mi)
- Elevation: 130 m (430 ft)

Population (2025)
  - Total: 1,830
- Time zone: UTC+1 (CET)
  - Summer (DST): UTC+2 (CEST)
- Postal code: 851 10
- Area code: +421-2
- Vehicle registration plate (until 2022): BA, BL, BT
- Website: www.cunovo.eu

Čunovo (Croatian: Čunovo, Hungarian: Dunacsún, Duna-Csún, German: Sandorf) is a small part of Bratislava, Slovakia, in the southern area near the Hungarian border. It is located close to the Gabčíkovo - Nagymaros Dams.

== Geography ==
The municipality lies at an altitude of 130 metres (430 ft) and covers an area of 18.62 km^{2} (7.19 sq mi) (2025).

== History ==
Čunovo was first mentioned as a village in 1232 under the name Chun. In the 16th century, Croats fleeing the Ottomans in the south settled in the village. Until 1947, Čunovo, along with Jarovce and Rusovce, was part of Hungary and was annexed that year, it was annexed to Czechoslovakia, to enable construction of the Port of Bratislava. It became an official part of Bratislava on January 1, 1972. Some of the inhabitants still speak the Croatian language and preserve folk traditions.

== Tourism ==
In 2000, a new art museum called Danubiana was opened. Dunajské luhy Protected Landscape Area comprises some parts of the borough. It is home to Čunovo Water Sports Centre an artificial whitewater facility built in 1996 which attracts paddlers from around the world.

== Transport ==
Čunovo is close to the international motorway E65/E75 and railway crossing to Hungary. The first town inside Hungary is Rajka.

Since 21 December 2007, all border controls have been lifted as Hungary and Slovakia became part of the Schengen Area.

== Population ==
Population statistic (10 years)
Year	1995	2005	2015	2025
Count	785	919	1332	1830
Difference		+17.07%	+44.94%	+37.38%

Population statistic
Year	2024	2025
Count	1811	1830
Difference		+1.04%

It has a population of 1830 people (31 December 2025).

=== Ethnicity ===
Census 2021 (1+ %)
Ethnicity	Number	Fraction
Slovak	1437	87.88%
Croatian	158	9.66%
Hungarian	73	4.46%
Czech	30	1.83%
Not found out	27	1.65%
Other	21	1.28%
Total	1635	

In year 2021 was 1635 people by ethnicity 1437 as Slovak, 158 as Croatian, 73 as Hungarian, 30 as Czech, 27 as Not found out, 21 as Other, 14 as German, 10 as Austrian, 5 as Polish, 4 as Russian, 3 as Ukrainian, 2 as Jewish, 2 as Rusyn, 2 as Bulgarian, 1 as Irish, 1 as Silesian and 1 as French.

Note on population: The difference values of population numbers in the table "Population statistic" and in the sections "Ethnicity" & "Religion" is caused by the use of various statistical methods.

=== Religion ===
Census 2021 (1+ %)
Religion	Number	Fraction
Roman Catholic Church	951	58.17%
None	556	34.01%
Not found out	33	2.02%
Evangelical Church	32	1.96%
Total	1635	

In year 2021 was 1635 people by religion 951 from Roman Catholic Church, 556 from None, 33 from Not found out, 32 from Evangelical Church, 9 from Ad hoc movements, 8 from Greek Catholic Church, 7 from Calvinist Church, 7 from Eastern Orthodox Church, 7 from Apostolic Church, 6 from Other, 5 from Christian Congregations in Slovakia, 5 from Islam, 3 from Buddhism, 2 from Jewish community, 1 from Paganism and natural spirituality, 1 from Jehovah's Witnesses, 1 from Hinduism and 1 from Czechoslovak Hussite Church.

== Gallery ==
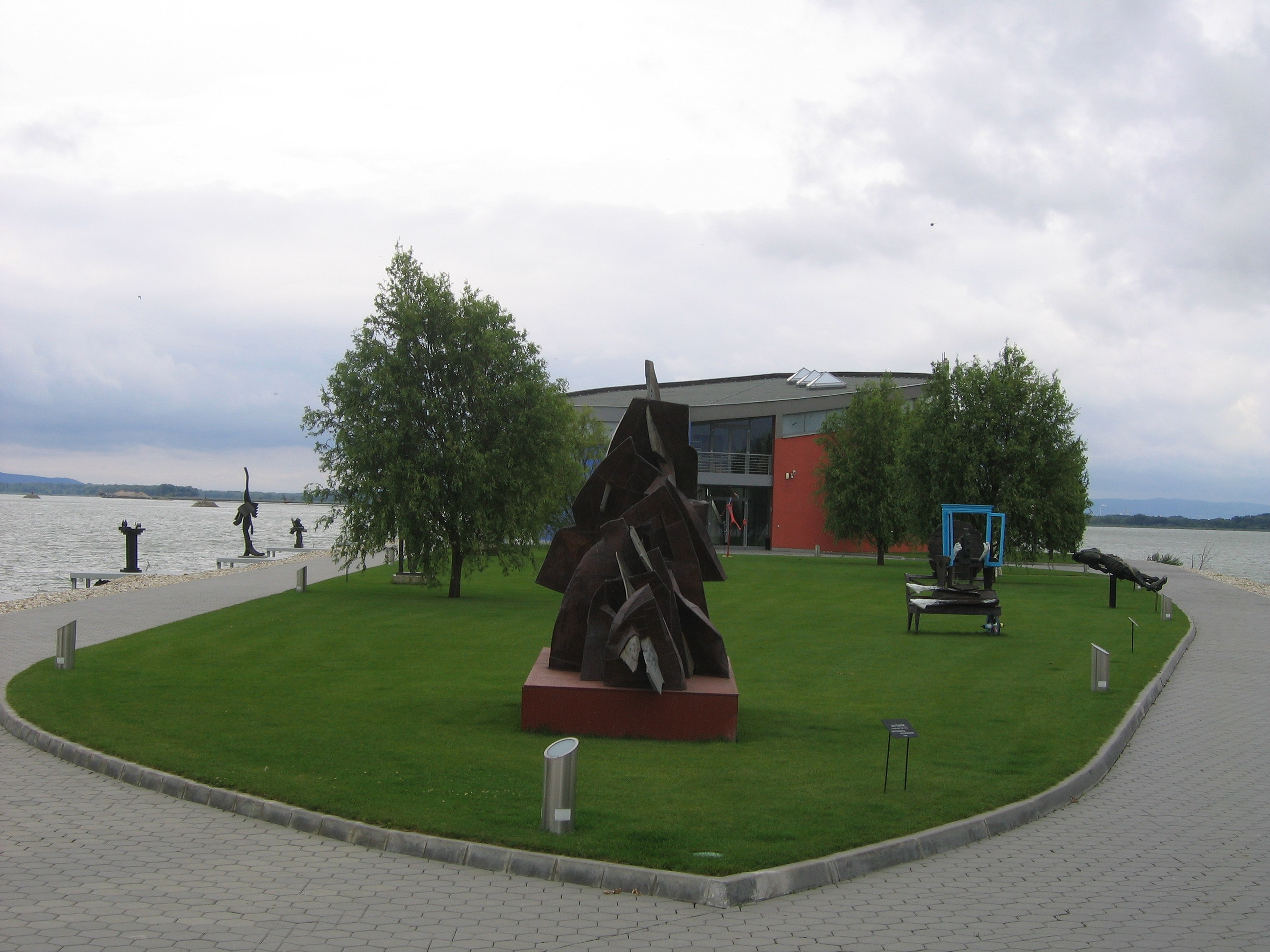
The Danubian Meulensteen Art Museum, near Čunovo.

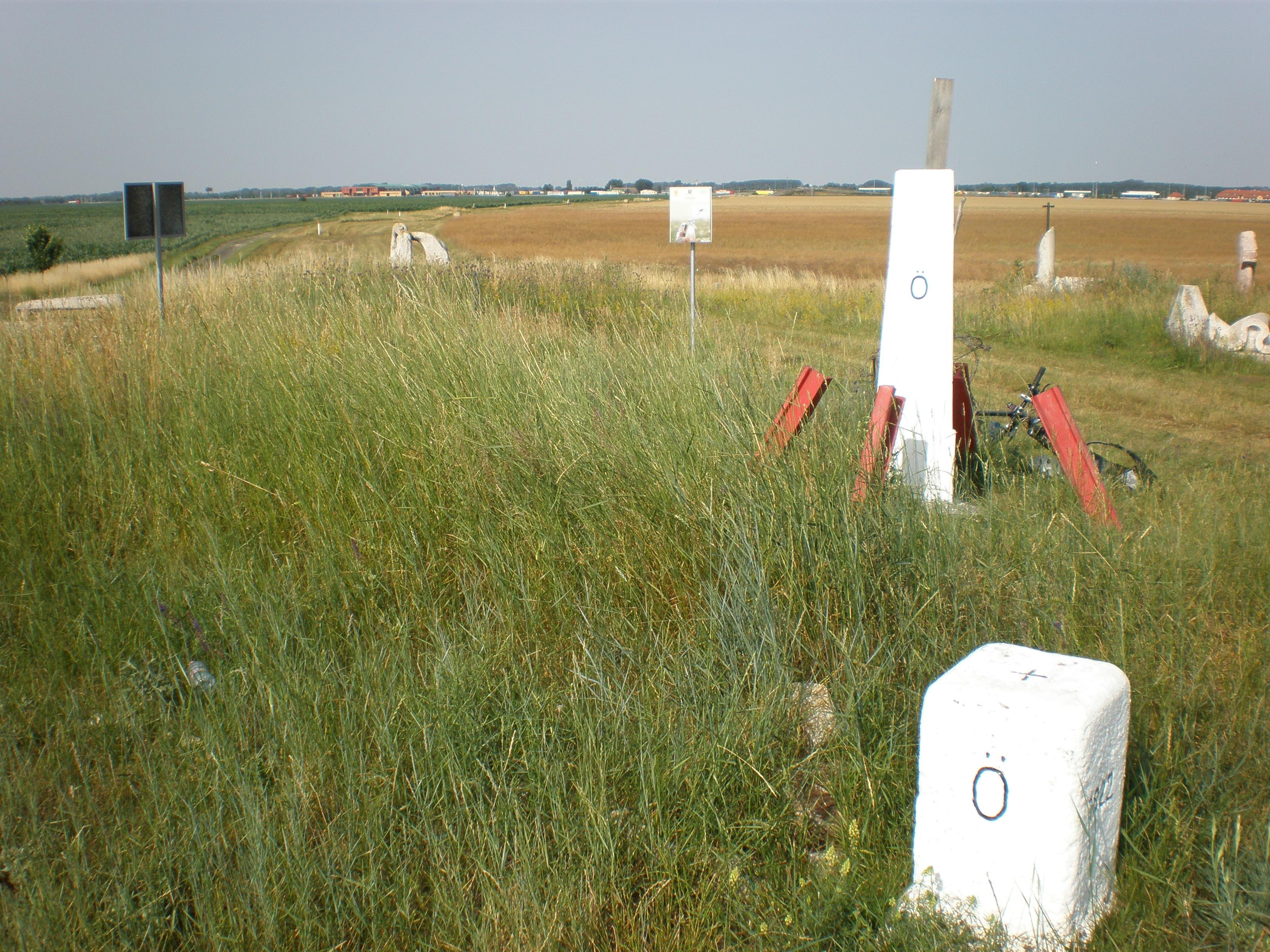
Tripoint with Austria-Hungary-Slovakia near Čunovo.

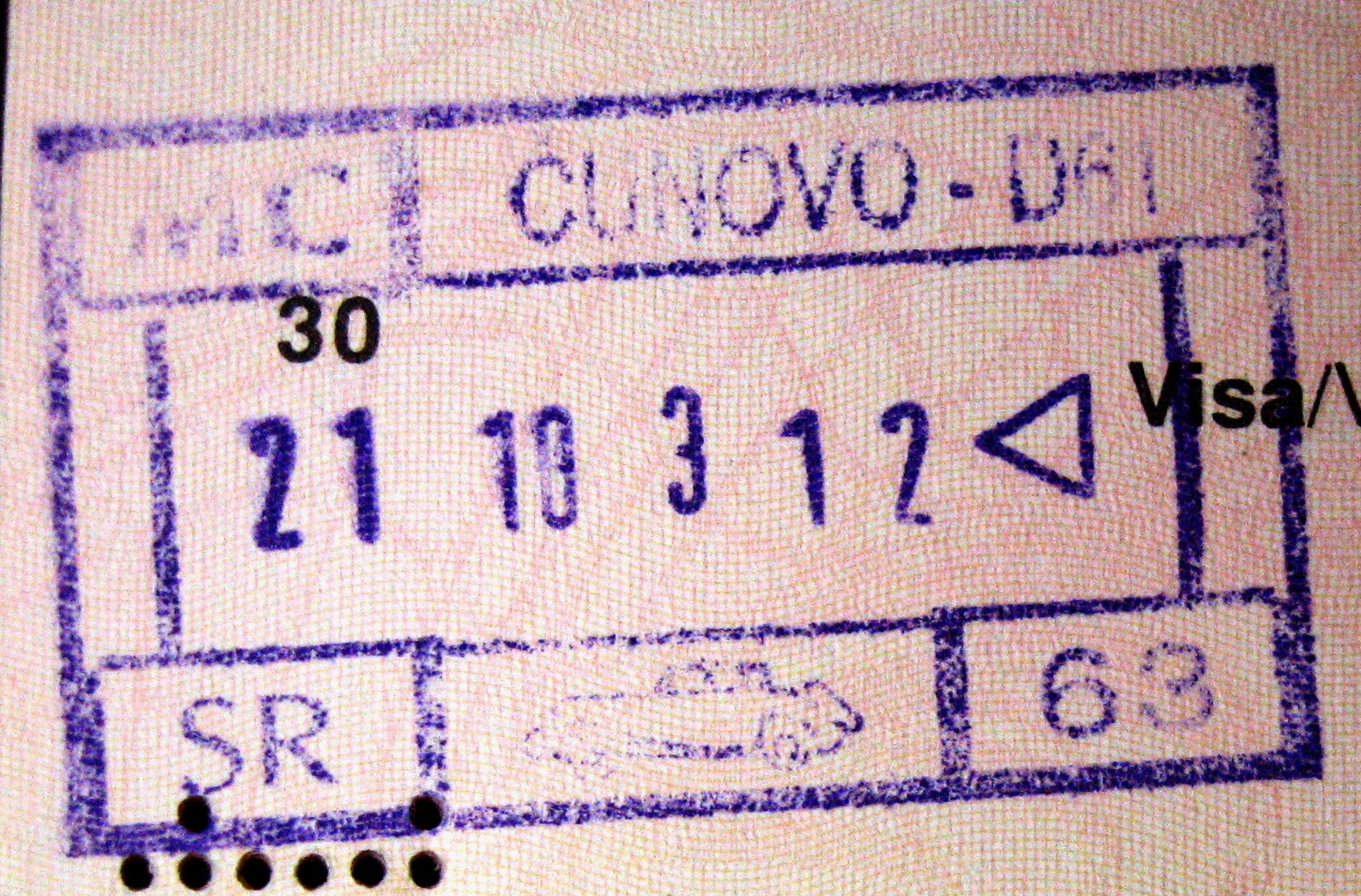
Passport enty stamp via road from Čunovo.
