= Jarovce =

- Borough
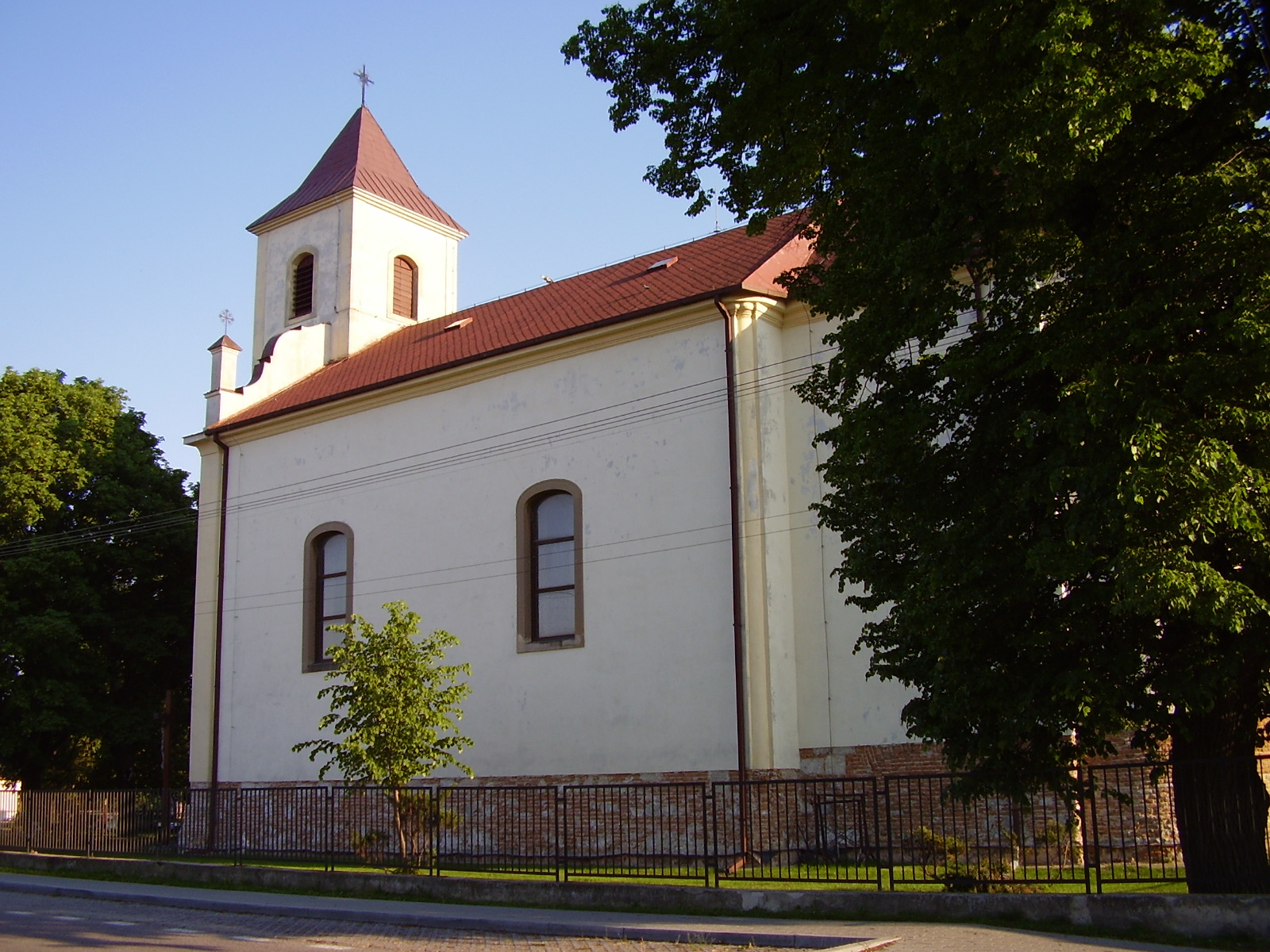
- A church in Jarovce

- Flag Coat of arms

- Area of Jarovce in Bratislava

- Location of Jarovce in the Bratislava Region Location of Jarovce in Slovakia
- Coordinates: 48°3′55″N 17°6′48″E
- Country: Slovakia
- Region: Bratislava Region
- District: Bratislava V
- First mentioned: 1208

Government
  - Mayor: Jozef Uhler

Area
  - Total: 21.34 km^{2} (8.24 sq mi)
- Elevation: 135 m (443 ft)

Population (2025)
  - Total: 3,246
- Time zone: UTC+1 (CET)
  - Summer (DST): UTC+2 (CEST)
- Postal code: 851 10
- Area code: +421-2
- Vehicle registration plate (until 2022): BA, BL, BT
- Website: www.jarovce.sk

Jarovce (Hungarian: Horvátjárfalu, Horvát-Járfalu, Croatian: Hrvatski Jandrof, German: Kroatisch Jahrndorf) is a small borough of Bratislava, Slovakia.

== Geography ==
The municipality lies at an altitude of 135 metres (443 ft) and covers an area of 21.34 km^{2} (8.24 sq mi) (2025).

== History ==
The village was first mentioned in 1208 under the name Ban. During the Ottoman wars, many Croats settled here in the 16th century (therefore "Croatian" in the German name, in contrast to bordering Deutsch Jahrndorf ("German Jahrndorf") in Austria). They are still a strong minority. The area belonged to Hungary until 1947 along with the neighbouring villages Rusovce (Oroszvár in Hungarian) and Čunovo (Dunacsún in Hungarian). In the years 1947–1950, Jarovce administratively belonged to Rusovce. It has been an official borough of Bratislava since 1 January 1972.

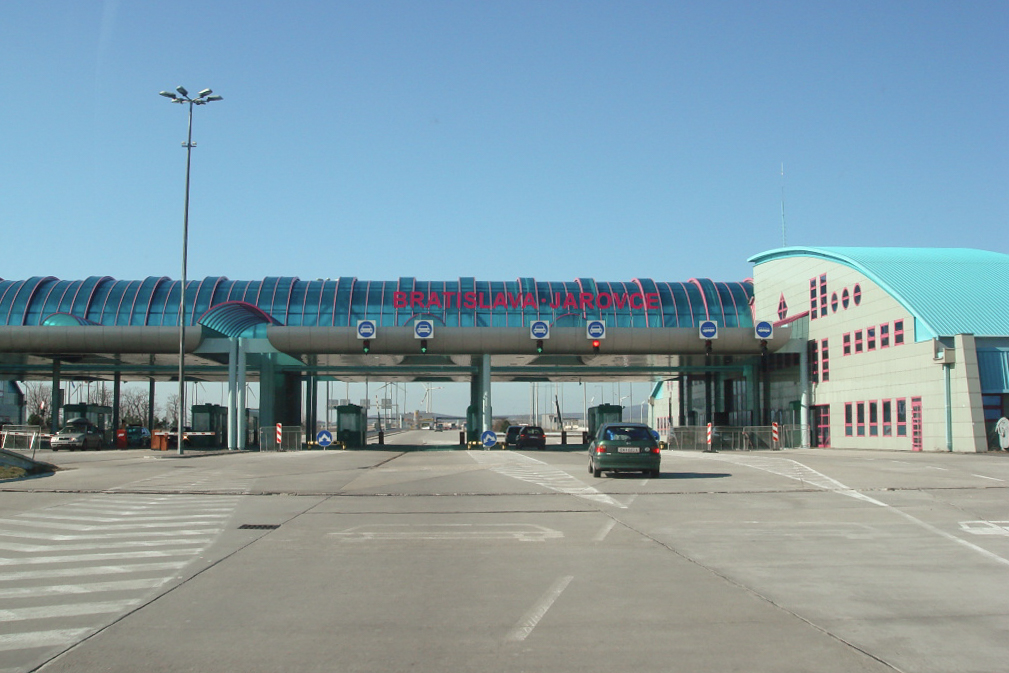
Former Jarovce border crossing

== Transport ==
Jarovce is where the only motorway (European route E58) which becomes the A6 border crossing between Slovakia and Austria is located. The Austrian crossing is called Kittsee. There is a smaller crossing near the Kittsee railway station. Border checks at both crossings were discontinued on 21 December 2007 after Slovakia joined the Schengen Area.

== Population ==
Population statistic (10 years)
Year	1995	2005	2015	2025
Count	1094	1227	2011	3246
Difference		+12.15%	+63.89%	+61.41%

Population statistic
Year	2024	2025
Count	3147	3246
Difference		+3.14%

It has a population of 3246 people (31 December 2025).

=== Ethnicity ===
Census 2021 (1+ %)
Ethnicity	Number	Fraction
Slovak	2361	87.25%
Croatian	266	9.83%
Hungarian	159	5.87%
Not found out	84	3.1%
Total	2706	

In year 2021 was 2706 people by ethnicity 2361 as Slovak, 266 as Croatian, 159 as Hungarian, 84 as Not found out, 27 as Czech, 22 as German, 14 as Other, 10 as Rusyn, 8 as Russian, 7 as Serbian, 6 as French, 4 as Ukrainian, 4 as Italian, 4 as Romani, 4 as Moravian, 2 as Jewish, 2 as Austrian, 1 as Romanian, 1 as Greek and 1 as English.

Note on population: The difference values of population numbers in the table "Population statistic" and in the sections "Ethnicity" & "Religion" is caused by the use of various statistical methods.

=== Religion ===
Census 2021 (1+ %)
Religion	Number	Fraction
Roman Catholic Church	1426	52.7%
None	1047	38.69%
Not found out	83	3.07%
Evangelical Church	76	2.81%
Total	2706	

In year 2021 was 2706 people by religion 1426 from Roman Catholic Church, 1047 from None, 83 from Not found out, 76 from Evangelical Church, 15 from Greek Catholic Church, 10 from Other, 9 from Buddhism, 8 from Eastern Orthodox Church, 7 from Ad hoc movements, 6 from Calvinist Church, 5 from Paganism and natural spirituality, 5 from Jehovah's Witnesses, 3 from Other and not ascertained christian church, 2 from Apostolic Church, 1 from Jewish community, 1 from Christian Congregations in Slovakia, 1 from Hinduism and 1 from Church of the Brethren.

== The St. Nicholas church in Jarovce ==
The oldest church in locality of Bratislava V is the late baroque St. Nicholas church which is located in Jarovce, which comes from the years 1763–1765. There are two versions of its establishment. The first version holds it that the church was built by local inhabitants in 1765. The second version says that this church was built by an owner of this location - by the count Miklós Eszterházy. Before the end of World War II on 3 April 1945, the church tower was destroyed by the recessive German armies. Building-up the new church tower lasted two years. People put into this tower two carillons which are there up to this day. The last repairs were made in the end of the 1990s.
