= Győr-Moson-Sopron County 5th constituency =

Constituency in Hungary (2012-)

Győr-Moson-Sopron County 5th constituency (Mosonmagyaróvár)
- Constituency for the National Assembly
- Location of Győr-Moson-Sopron county 05 within Győr-Moson-Sopron county

- Location of Győr-Moson-Sopron county within Hungary
- County: Győr-Moson-Sopron
- Electorate: 77,129 (2022)
- Major settlements: Mosonmagyaróvár

Current constituency
- Created: 2011; 15 years ago
- Party: Tisza Party
- Member: Krisztina Porpáczy
- Elected: 2026

The 5th constituency of Győr-Moson-Sopron County (Hungarian: Győr-Moson-Sopron megyei 05. számú országgyűlési egyéni választókerület) is one of the single member constituencies of the National Assembly, the national legislature of Hungary. The constituency standard abbreviation: Győr-Moson-Sopron 05. OEVK.

Since 2026, it has been represented by Krisztina Porpáczy of the Tisza Party.

== Geography ==
The 5th constituency is located in northern part of Győr-Moson-Sopron County.

=== List of municipalities ===
The constituency includes the following municipalities:

1. Abda
2. Ásványráró
3. Bezenye
4. Börcs
5. Cakóháza
6. Darnózseli
7. Dunakiliti
8. Dunaremete
9. Dunaszeg
10. Dunaszentpál
11. Dunasziget
12. Feketeerdő
13. Győrladamér
14. Győrújfalu
15. Győrzámoly
16. Halászi
17. Hédervár
18. Hegyeshalom
19. Jánossomorja
20. Károlyháza
21. Kimle
22. Kisbodak
23. Kunsziget
24. Lébény
25. Levél
26. Lipót
27. Máriakálnok
28. Mecsér
29. Mosonmagyaróvár
30. Mosonszentmiklós
31. Mosonszolnok
32. Mosonudvar
33. Öttevény
34. Püski
35. Rábcakapi
36. Rajka
37. Újrónafő
38. Vámosszabadi
39. Várbalog

== Members ==
The constituency was first represented by István Nagy of the Fidesz from 2014, and he was re-elected in 2018 and 2022. In the 2026 election, Krisztina Porpáczy of the Tisza Party was elected representative.

Election	Member	Party	%	Ref.
2014	István Nagy	Fidesz	50.38	
2018	István Nagy	Fidesz	54.85	
2022	István Nagy	Fidesz	59.23	
2026	Krisztina Porpáczy	TISZA	52.76	
