= Main road 15 (Hungary) =

Road in Hungary

Main road 15
- 15-ös főút
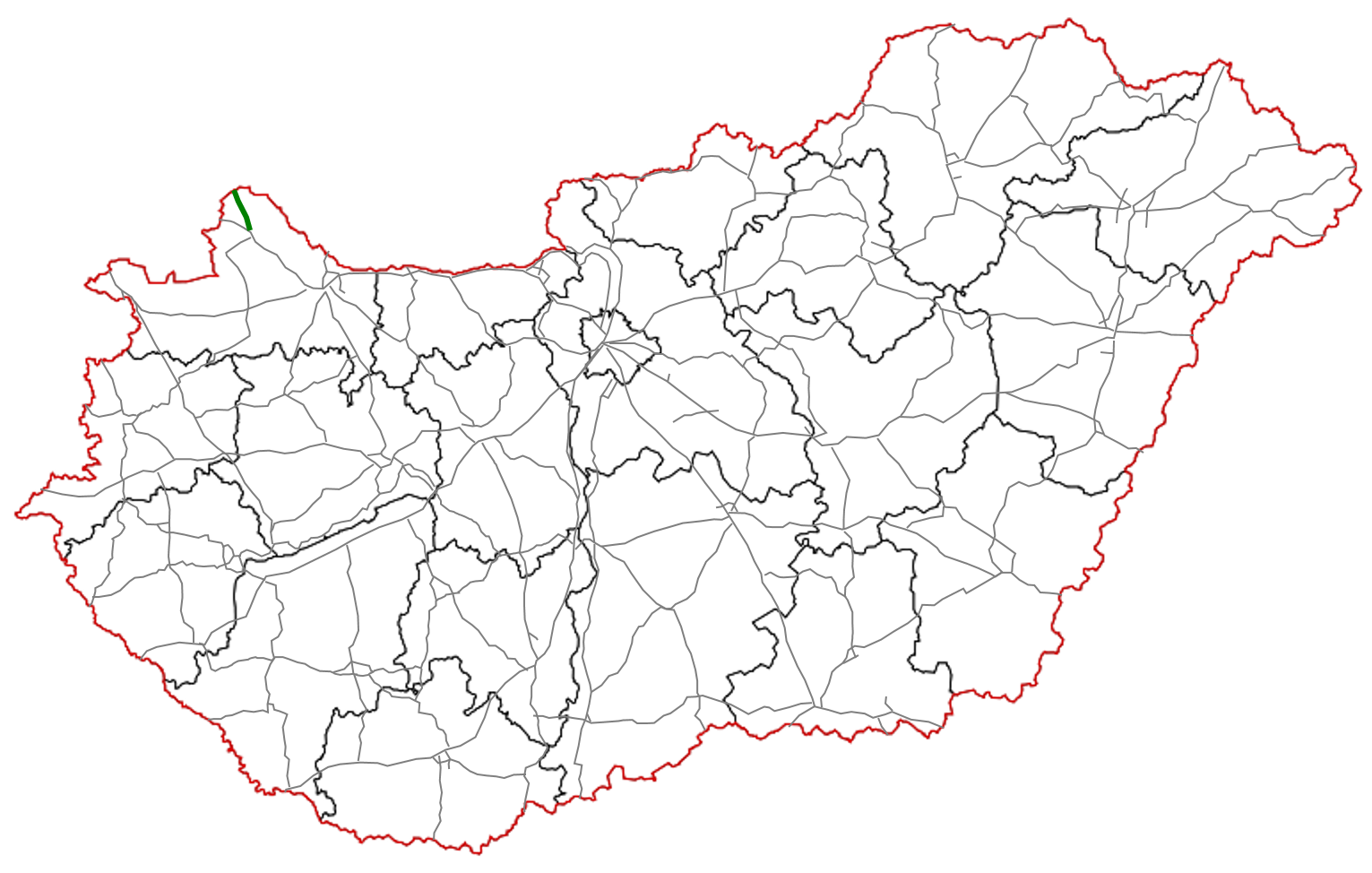

Route information
- Length: 17.509 km (10.880 mi)

Major junctions
- From: 1 in Mosonmagyaróvár
- To: Rajka border with Slovakia I/2

Location
- Country: Hungary
- Counties: Győr-Moson-Sopron
- Major cities: Mosonmagyaróvár

Highway system
- Roads in Hungary; Highways; Main roads; Local roads

The Main road 15 (Hungarian: 15-ös főút) (formerly Main road 150) is a south–north direction First class main road in the Kisalföld, that connects the Main road 1 change to the border of Slovakia. The road is 17.5 kilometres (10.9 mi) long. Most of the traffic was taken over by the M15 motorway.

The road, as well as all other main roads in Hungary, is managed and maintained by Magyar Közút, state owned company.

== Road junctions and populated areas ==
Main road 15 junctions/populated areas/toll plazas
Type	Slip roads/Notes
	Mosonmagyaróvár; Main road 1 Connection to Győr, Budapest or Hegyeshalom. The southern terminus of the road.
	Mosonmagyaróvár, Halászi út Side road 1401 to Hédervár and Győr.
	Lajta
	Mosonmagyaróvár, Feketeerdei út Side road 1408 to Feketeerdő.
	Bezenye; Side road 1501 to Hegyeshalom.
	Rajka; Side road 1408 to Dunakiliti. Side road 1409 to the border towards Čunovo, Slovakia. Side road 1502 to the border towards Deutsch Jahrndorf, Austria. M15 motorway junction towards to the border or M1 motorway.
	Rajka border crossing to Slovakia; Route 2 to Čunovo, Slovakia. The northern terminus of the road.

== See also ==
- Roads in Hungary
