= Mosonmagyaróvár District =

Mosonmagyaróvár District Mosonmagyaróvári járás
- District
- Coat of arms

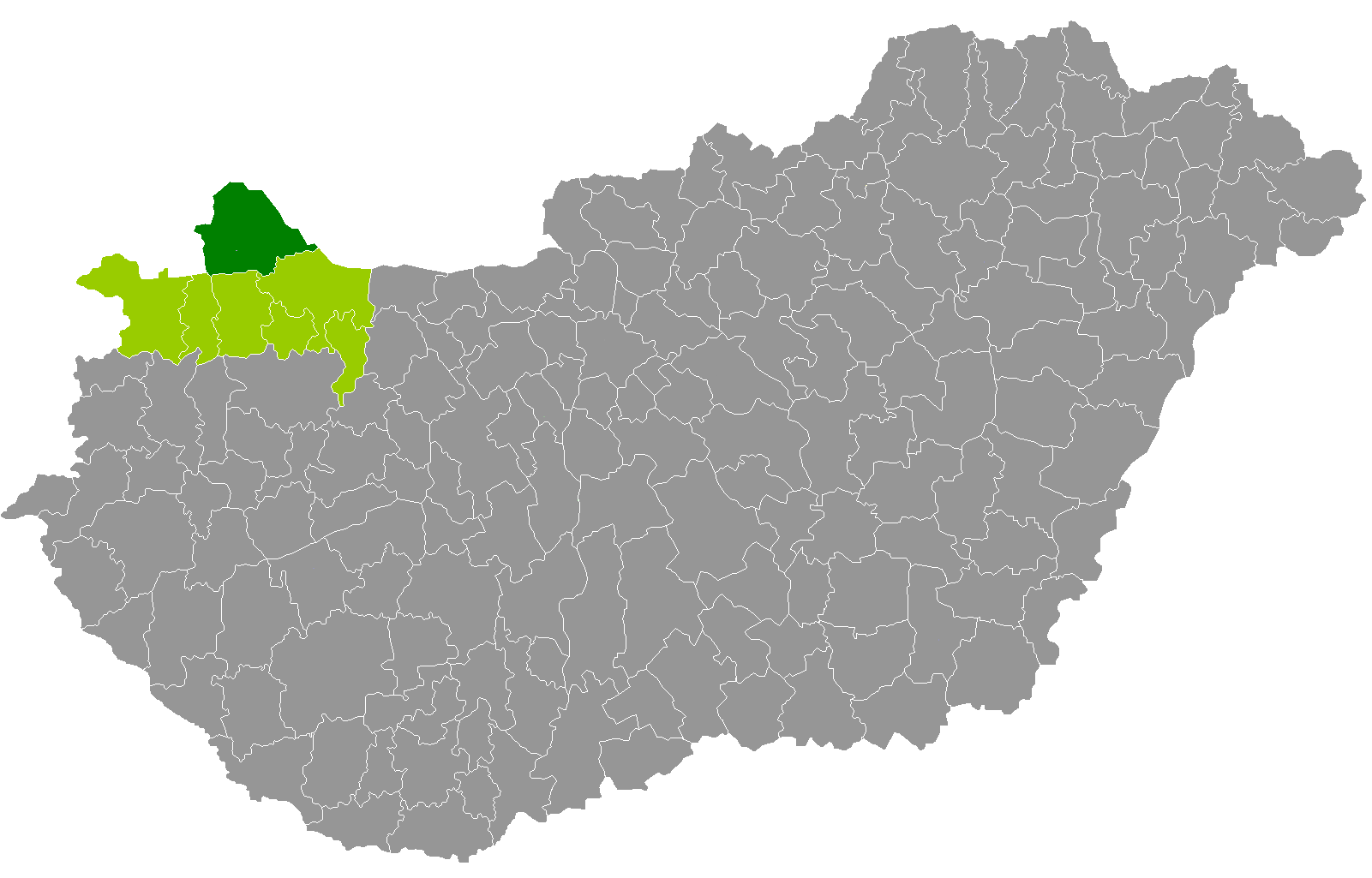
- Mosonmagyaróvár District within Hungary and Győr-Moson-Sopron County.
- Coordinates: 47.87°N 17.27°E
- Country: Hungary
- County: Győr-Moson-Sopron
- District seat: Mosonmagyaróvár

Area
  - Total: 899.97 km^{2} (347.48 sq mi)
  - Rank: 2nd in Győr-Moson-Sopron

Population (2011 census)
  - Total: 72,609
  - Rank: 3rd in Győr-Moson-Sopron
  - Density: 81/km^{2} (210/sq mi)

Mosonmagyaróvár (Hungarian: Mosonmagyaróvári járás) is a district in northern part of Győr-Moson-Sopron County. Mosonmagyaróvár is also the town where the district seat is found. The district is located in the Western Transdanubia statistical region.

== Geography ==
Mosonmagyaróvár District borders with the Slovak regions of Bratislava and Trnava to the northeast, Győr District and Csorna District to the south, Kapuvár District and Austrian state of Burgenland to the west. The number of the inhabited places in Mosonmagyaróvár District is 26.

== Municipalities ==
The district has three towns (bolded), one large village (in italics) and 22 villages. (ordered by population, as of 1 January 2012)

- Ásványráró (1,858)
- Bezenye (1,393)
- Darnózseli (1,566)
- Dunakiliti (1,857)
- Dunaremete (241)
- Dunasziget (1,437)
- Feketeerdő (563)
- Halászi (2,973)
- Hegyeshalom (3,479)
- Hédervár (1,195)
- **Jánossomorja** (5,912)
- Károlyháza (648)
- Kimle (2,195)
- Kisbodak (354)
- **Lébény** (3,159)
- Levél (1,777)
- Lipót (675)
- Máriakálnok (1,692)
- Mecsér (589)
- **Mosonmagyaróvár** (32,720) – district seat
- Mosonszolnok (1,676)
- Mosonudvar (498)
- Püski (641)
- Rajka (2,563)
- Újrónafő (793)
- Várbalog (385)

== Demographics ==
Religion in Mosonmagyaróvár District (2011 census)
1. Catholic Church (54.7%)
2. Greek Catholicism (0.20%)
3. Calvinism (2.80%)
4. Lutheranism (2.30%)
5. Other religions (0.70%)
6. Non-religious (11.1%)
7. Atheists (1.10%)
8. Undeclared (27.1%)

In 2011, it had a population of 72,609 and the population density was 81/km^{2}.

Year	County population	Change
2011	72,609	n/a

=== Ethnicity ===
Besides the Hungarian majority, the main minorities are the German (approx. 3,000), Slovak (1,300), Croat (1,000), Roma (300) and Romanian (200).

Total population (2011 census): 72,609
Ethnic groups (2011 census): Identified themselves: 67,682 persons:

- Hungarians: 61,125 (90.31%)
- Germans: 3,077 (4.55%)
- Slovaks: 1,363 (2.01%)
- Croats: 1,009 (1.49%)
- Others and indefinable: 1,108 (1.64%)

Approx. 5,000 persons in Mosonmagyaróvár District did not declare their ethnic group at the 2011 census.

=== Religion ===
Religious adherence in the county according to 2011 census:

- Catholic – 39,885 (Roman Catholic – 39,705; Greek Catholic – 163);
- Reformed – 2,018;
- Evangelical – 1,653;
- other religions – 511;
- Non-religious – 8,084;
- Atheism – 804;
- Undeclared – 19,654.

== See also ==
- List of cities and towns in Hungary
