= M15 motorway (Hungary) =

Road in Hungary

M15 motorway
- M15-ös autópálya
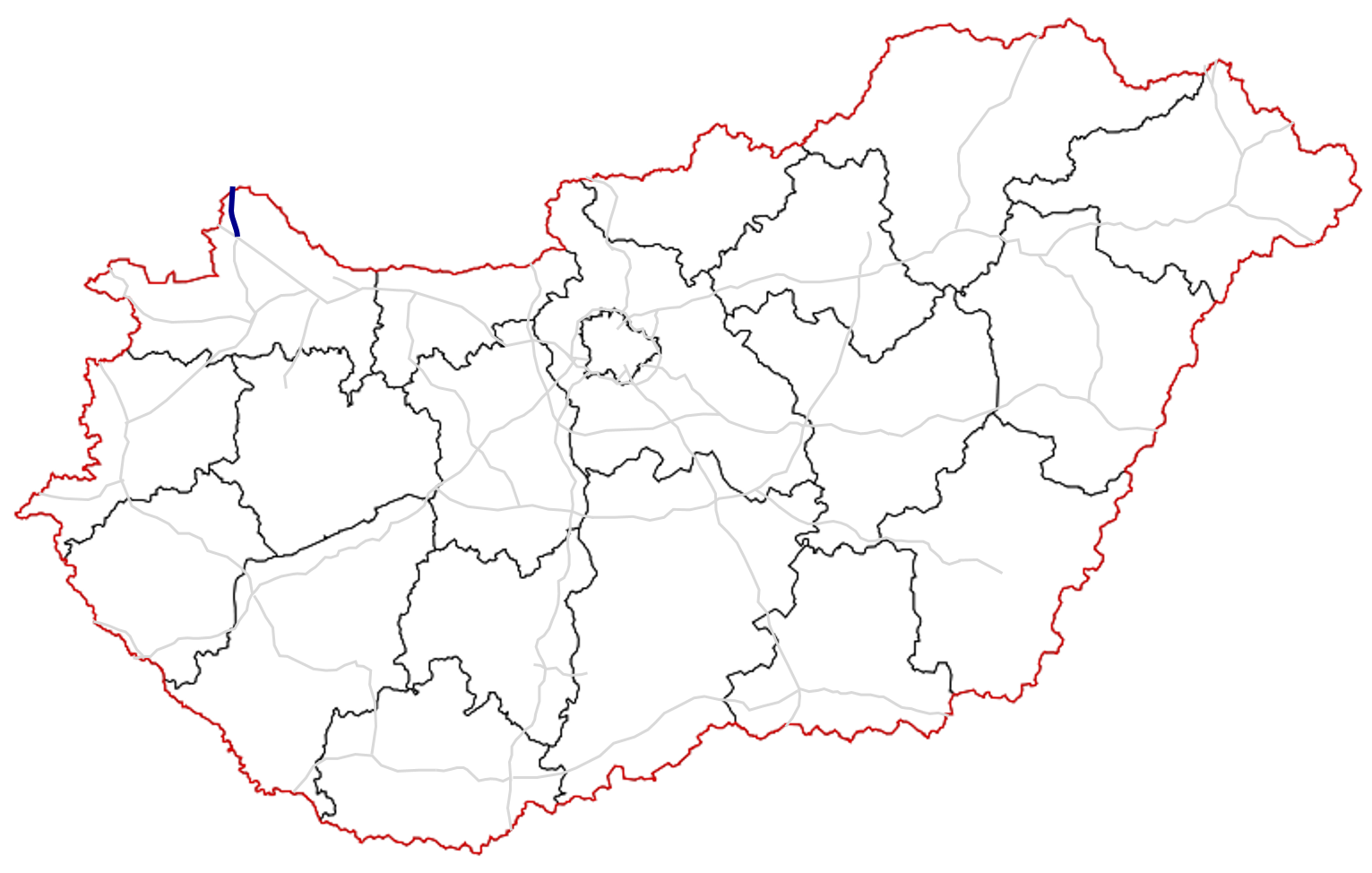
- in use other highways

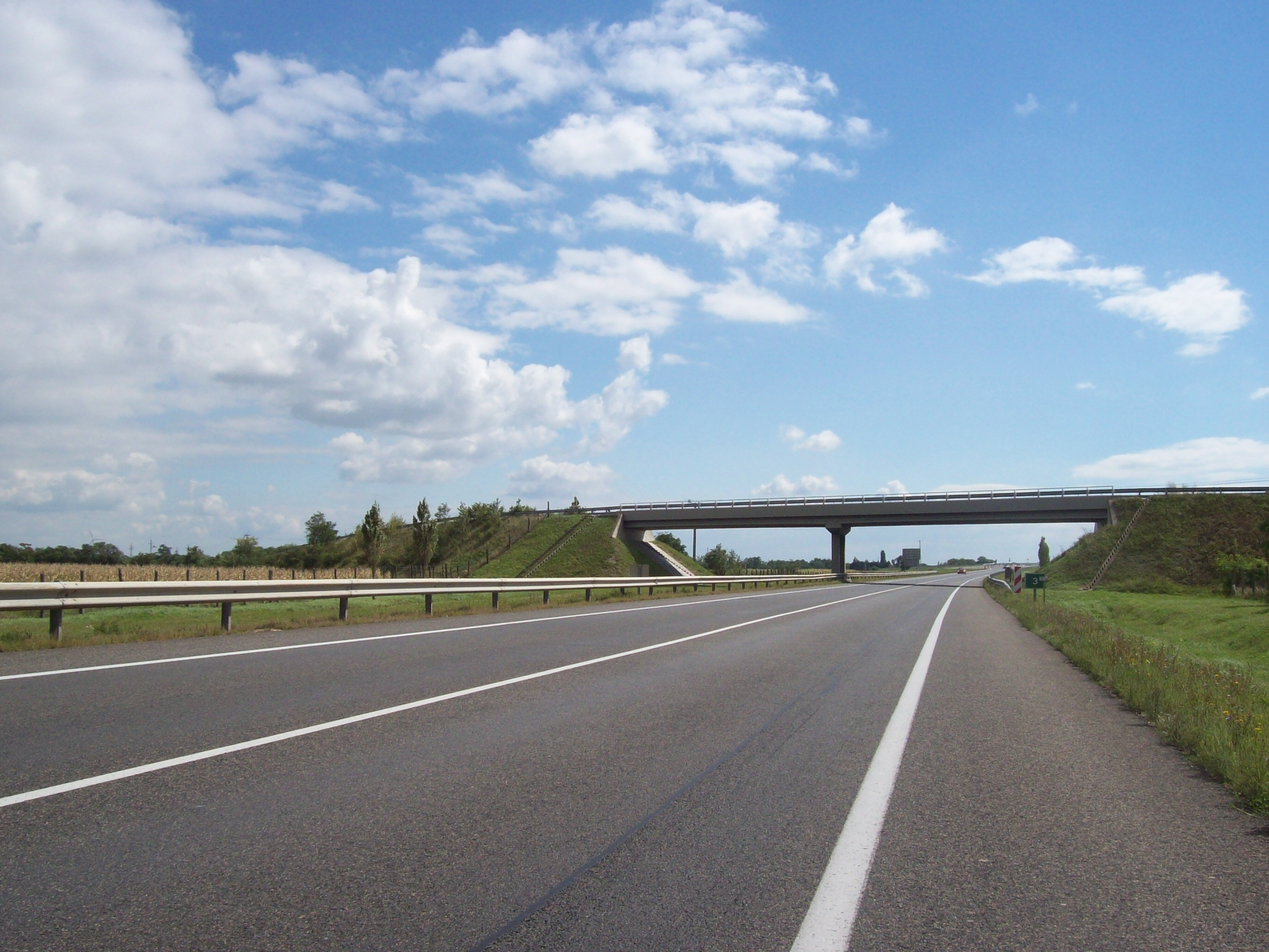
- M15 near Rajka in 2010

Route information
- Part of E65 / E75
- Length: 15 km (9.3 mi)
- Existed: 1996–present
- History: Completed: 1998; Expansion: 2018–19

Major junctions
- From: M1 near Mosonmagyaróvár
- 1 in Hegyeshalom
- To: D2 border with Slovakia

Location
- Country: Hungary
- Counties: Győr-Moson-Sopron

Highway system
- Roads in Hungary; Highways; Main roads; Local roads

The M15 motorway (Hungarian: M15-ös autópálya) is a Hungarian motorway connects the M1 motorway to Bratislava, the capital of Slovakia. The Hungary-Slovakia border crossing is at Rajka (Hungary) and Čunovo (Slovakia).

Until 2019, the M15 motorway featured grade separation akin to all motorways, but did not feature four lanes. The M15 has been widened to four lanes by December 2019, a few months ahead of schedule.

== Timeline ==
Section	Length	Opened	Notes
Levél (M1) – Rajka (border)	15.0 km (9.32 mi)	Single carriageway: 23 June 1998; Second carriageway: 18 December 2019	Built between 1996 – 1998. Both carriageways were fully built between 2017 – 2019

== Route description ==
- The route is full length motorway. The maximum speed limit is 130km/h, with (2x2 lane road with stop lane).

County	km	Type	Destination	Notes
Győr-Moson-Sopron	0	Interchange	M1 / E60 / E65 / E75 – Budapest, Mosonmagyaróvár Main road 86 Szombathely	The southern terminus of the motorway, and E65, E75 concurrency. Kilometrage starting point modified trumpet interchange no exit ramp to M1 Hegyeshalom → Vienna (A)
Győr-Moson-Sopron	2	Exit	Main road 1 – Levél / Hegyeshalom	exit ramp to M1 Hegyeshalom → Vienna (A)
Győr-Moson-Sopron		Bridge	Lajta híd	híd means Bridge
Győr-Moson-Sopron	6	Exit	Bezenye	Temporary closed
Győr-Moson-Sopron	14	Exit	Main road 15 – Rajka	
Győr-Moson-Sopron	14	Rest area	Pihenőhely	parking, restaurant, shower facilities, and Slovak vignette pihenőhely means Rest area
Győr-Moson-Sopron	15	Border crossing within the EU	Rajka (H) – Čunovo (SK) border crossing D2 / E65 / E75 – Bratislava	Rajka border crossing to Slovakia → D2 motorway. The northern terminus of the motorway, and E65, E75 concurrency.
1.000 mi = 1.609 km; 1.000 km = 0.621 mi: Concurrency terminus; Incomplete access; Unopened

== Maintenance ==
The operation and maintenance of the road by Hungarian Concession Infrastructure Development Plc. This activity is provided by this highway engineer.

- near Lébény (M1), kilometre trench 142

== Payment ==
The M15 motorway is fully tolled road. Hungarian system has 2 main type in terms of salary:

1, time-based fee vignettes (E-matrica);

- Cars, vans and motorbikes up to 3.5 tonnes only need to buy a single vignette which costs 6,400 Hungarian forint (Ft) for 10 days, 10,360 Ft for 1 month and 57,260 Ft for a year, from 1 January 2024.

2, county vignettes (vármegyei matrica); the highway can be used instead of the national sticker with the following county stickers:

Type of county vignette	Available section
Győr-Moson-Sopron	full length (0 km – 15 km)

== European Route(s) ==
Name	Route
	15 km	(Slovakia) Diaľnica D2 – junction (0)

== See also ==
- Roads in Hungary
- Transport in Hungary
- International E-road network
