= Rajka =

Rajka Ragendorf
- Coat of arms
- Interactive map of Rajka
- Location of Rajka Rajka (Hungary)
- Coordinates: 47.99689°N 17.19832°E
- Country: Hungary
- County: Győr-Moson-Sopron
- District: Mosonmagyaróvár

Area
  - Total: 52.63 km^{2} (20.32 sq mi)

Population (2022)
  - Total: 5,224
  - Density: 99.26/km^{2} (257.1/sq mi)

Population by ethnicity (2022)
  - Hungarians: 37.2%
  - Slovaks: 63.2%
  - Germans: 3%
  - Croats: 0.3%
  - Other: 4.2%
  - Unreported: 8.7%

Population by religion (2011)
  - Roman Catholic: 49.5%
  - Lutherans: 2.9%
  - Calvinists: 2.0%
  - Other: 0.9%
  - Non-religious: 11.9%
  - Unreported: 32.9%
- Time zone: UTC+1 (CET)
  - Summer (DST): UTC+2 (CEST)
- Postal code: 9224
- Area code: 96
- Motorways: M15
- Distance from Budapest: 181 km (112 mi) Southeast

Rajka (German: Ragendorf, Slovak: Rajka, Croatian: Rakindrof) is a village in Győr-Moson-Sopron County, Hungary. The village has large Slovak majority and a German minority.

== Etymology ==
The name comes from the Slavic personal name Rajko, Rajka (derived from rajь: paradise). 1297 Royka.

== Geography ==
Rajka is located in the Little Hungarian Plain 17 kilometres (11 mi) north-west of Mosonmagyaróvár, near the point where the borders of Hungary, Austria, and Slovakia join. M15 motorway (E65/E75), Highway 150, and the Budapest–Hegyeshalom–Rajka railway line all cross the village. The Hungarian-Slovak border crossing between Rajka and Čunovo was lifted on 21 December 2007, when Hungary and Slovakia acceded to the Schengen Area.

== History ==
Rajka was established before the 13th century. According to the Hungarian Royal Treasury (Magyar Királyi Kincstár) it was an ethnic German settlement in Hungary, called Rackendorf in 1495. In the 18th century it was a market town (mezőváros) in Moson County. The Jewish community was forcibly deported in 1944. After the Soviet occupation of Hungary in 1946, 859 German civilians were expelled from Rajka. They were replaced by ethnic Hungarians expelled from Czechoslovakia.

== Population ==
Mayor Vince Kiss spoke in 2012 of 1,000 Slovak citizens living in Rajka and making up one-third of the population. Most of these are ethnic Slovaks, but a significant proportion are ethnic Hungarian citizens of Slovakia or conversant with the Hungarian language. These Slovak citizens form a fragmented, dormitory community of people working or studying in Bratislava, the Slovak capital, and commuting there every day.

According to the 2011 census, however, the population of Rajka was 2,758, of whom 1,938 (70.3%) declared themselves Hungarians, 535 (19.4%) Slovaks and 284 (10.3%) Germans by ethnicity.

According to the 2022 census, Slovaks made up a plurality, and of the population of Rajka was 5,224, with 1,943 (32.7%) Hungarians, 3,302 (63.2%) Slovaks and 157 (3%) Germans by ethnicity. Note: The percentages may exceed 100% as individuals in Hungary are allowed to declare multiple nationalities in the census.

== Gallery ==
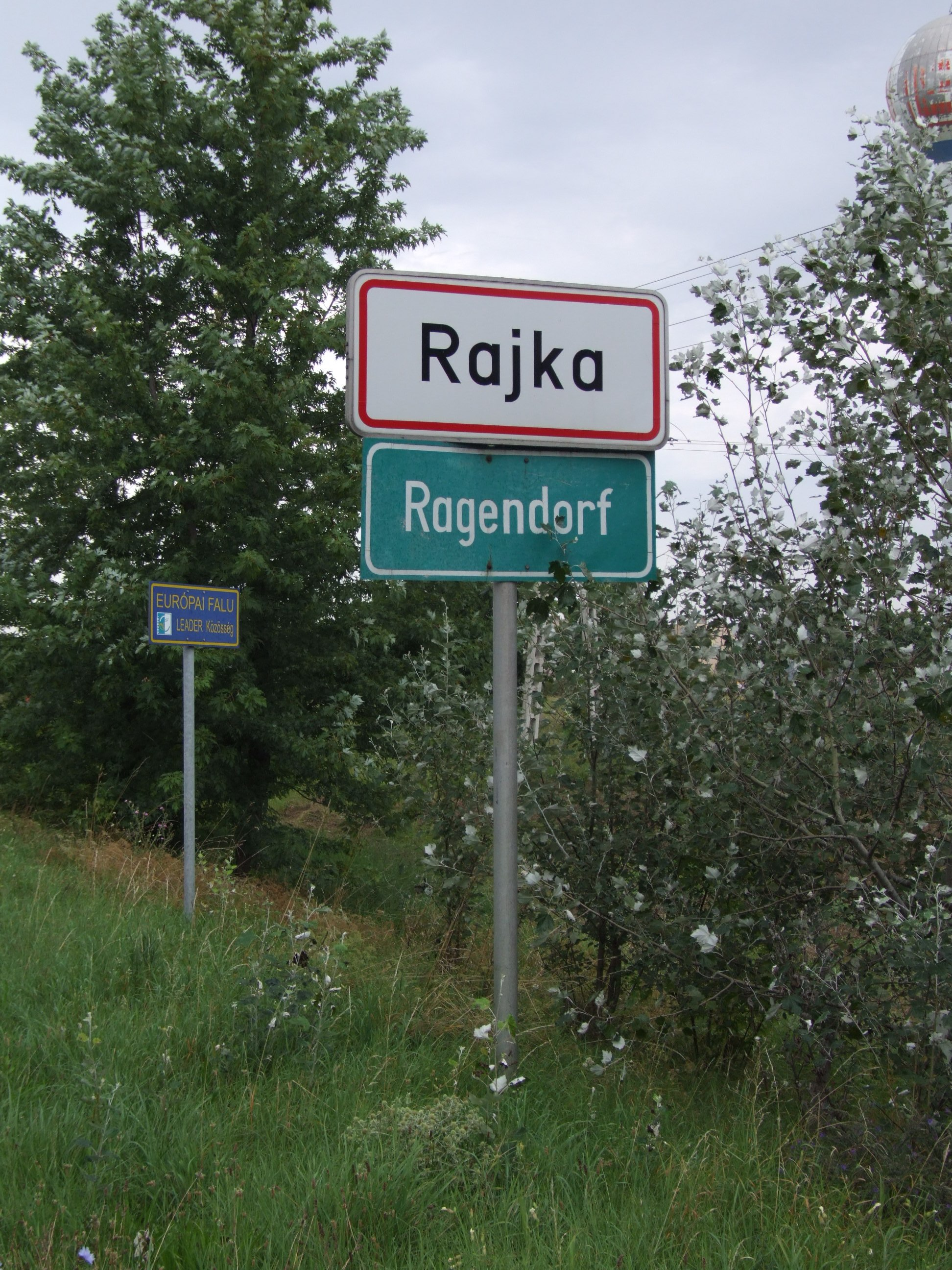
City limit signage in Hungarian and German

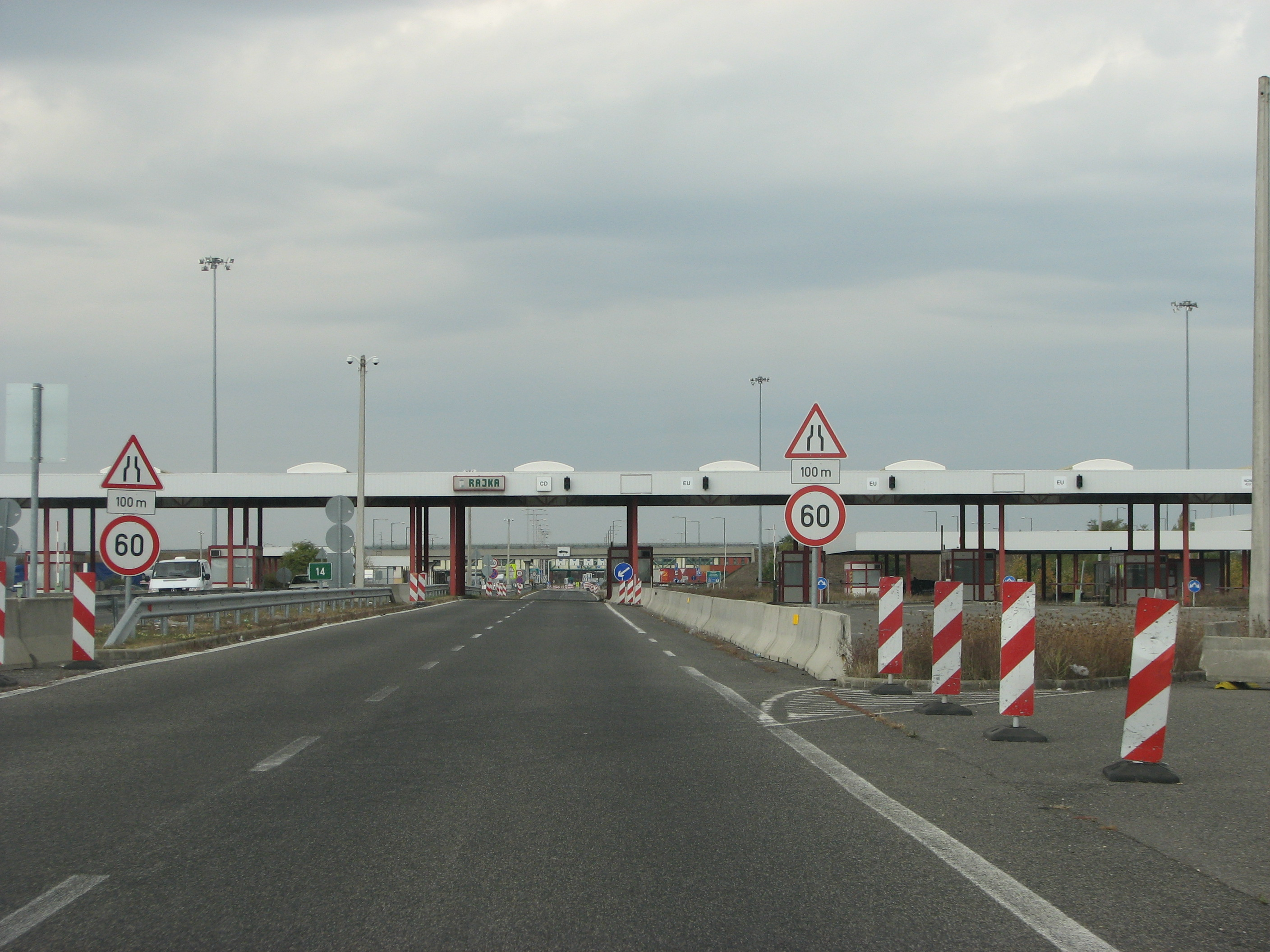
Rajka border checkpoint, no longer operational.

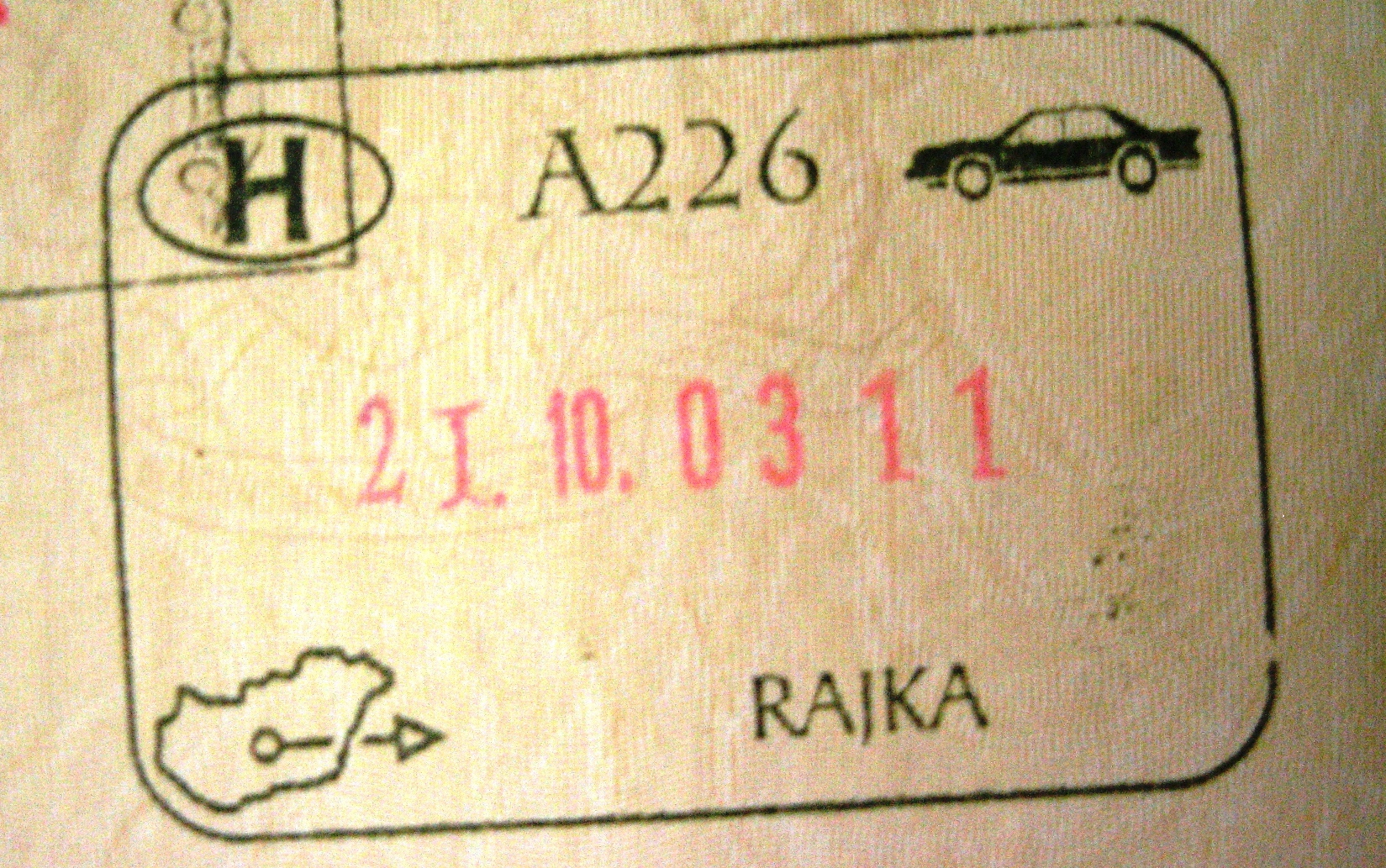
Pre-Schengen passport exit stamp from Rajka border crossing.

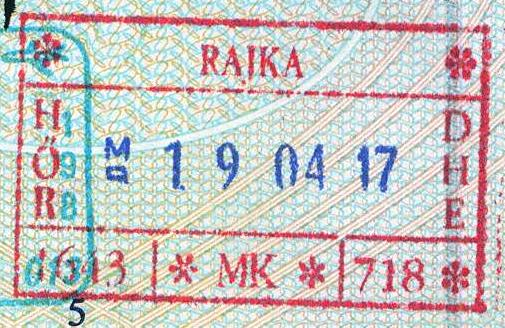
An earlier passport stamp from the same border crossing.
