= Manninger =

Manninger is a surname. Notable people with the surname include:

- Alex Manninger (1977–2026), Austrian footballer
- János Manninger (1901–1946), Hungarian photographer and director
- Jenő Manninger (born 1955), Hungarian architect and politician

== See also ==
- Olaf Maninger (born 1964), German cellist
