= Mátyás Laáb =

Croatian Catholic priest

Mátyás Laáb (Croatian: Matijaš Laáb) (c. 1746 – 7 August 1823) was a Burgenland Croatian Roman Catholic priest, writer, and translator. He is known for translating the first copy of the New Testament into Burgenland Croatian.

Born was in Bezenye near Mosonmagyaróvár. His priestly vocation began in 1790 in the Bischopric of Győr. He served for six years as a parson of Hidegség, and from 1797-1823 as priest in Neudorf bei Parndorf.

Laáb's aim was the reform of the Burgenland Croatian literary language. In 1812, he presented his translation of the New Testament in Zagreb, but the Burgenland New Testament was never published (the first published translation in Burgenland Croatian is the Novi Zakon from 1952 by Martin Meršić and Ivan Jakšić).

In addition, Laáb penned two catechisms.

== Works ==
- Translation of the New Testament (1812)
- Krátka summa velíkoga óbcsinszkoga katekízmusa za ucsnyu mláje druzsíne Gornyih Ug'rszki Horvátov (A Short Summa of the Great Catechism for the teaching of young Croatian families in Upper-Hungary, 1814)
- Véliki óbcsinszki katekizmus za Górnye Ugrszke Horváte (Great Cathecism for the Croats in Upper-Hungary, 1820)

== Sources ==
- Nikola Benčić: Književnost gradišćanskih Hrvata, Zagreb 1998. ISBN 953-6260-05-0
