= Mosonszolnok Wind Farm =

Wind farm in Hungary

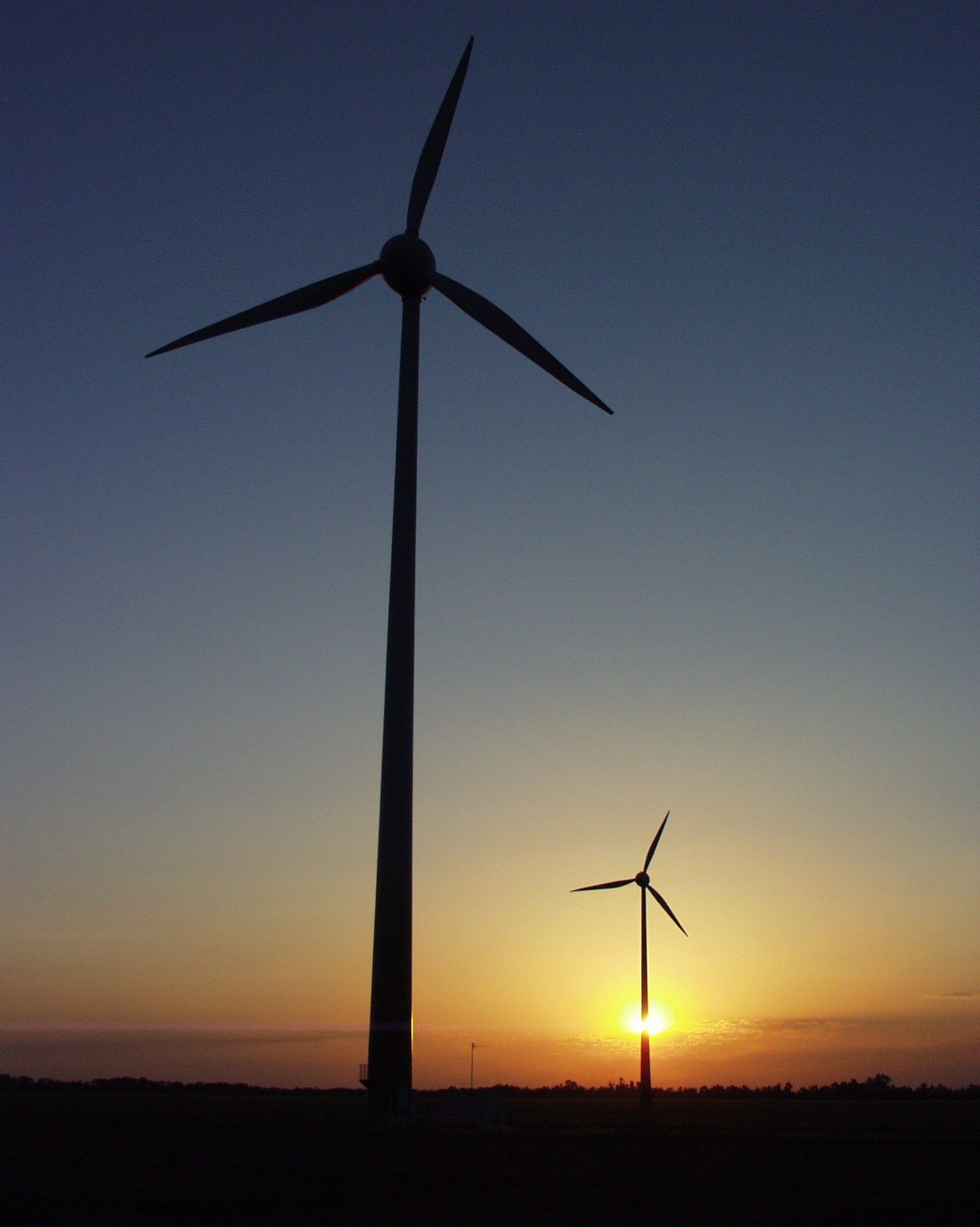
- Country: Hungary
- Location: Mosonszolnok, Győr-Moson-Sopron County
- Status: Operational
- Commission date: 2007
- Owner: Energy Corp

Power generation
- Units operational: 12
- Nameplate capacity: 24 MW

The Mosonszolnok Wind Farm is a wind farm in Győr-Moson-Sopron County, Hungary. It has 12 individual wind turbines with a nominal output of around 2 MW which will deliver up to 24 MW of power, enough to power over 9,494 homes, with a capital investment required of approximately US$40 million.
