= Krisztina Porpáczy =

Hungarian politician

Member of the National Assembly
- Assuming office 9 May 2026
- Succeeding: István Nagy
- Constituency: Győr-Moson-Sopron 5th

Personal details
- Party: Tisza

Krisztina Porpáczy is a Hungarian politician who was elected member of the National Assembly in 2026 representing the Győr-Moson-Sopron County 5th constituency. She previously worked as a general practitioner.
