= Neudorf bei Parndorf =

Neudorf Neudorf bei Parndorf
- Municipality
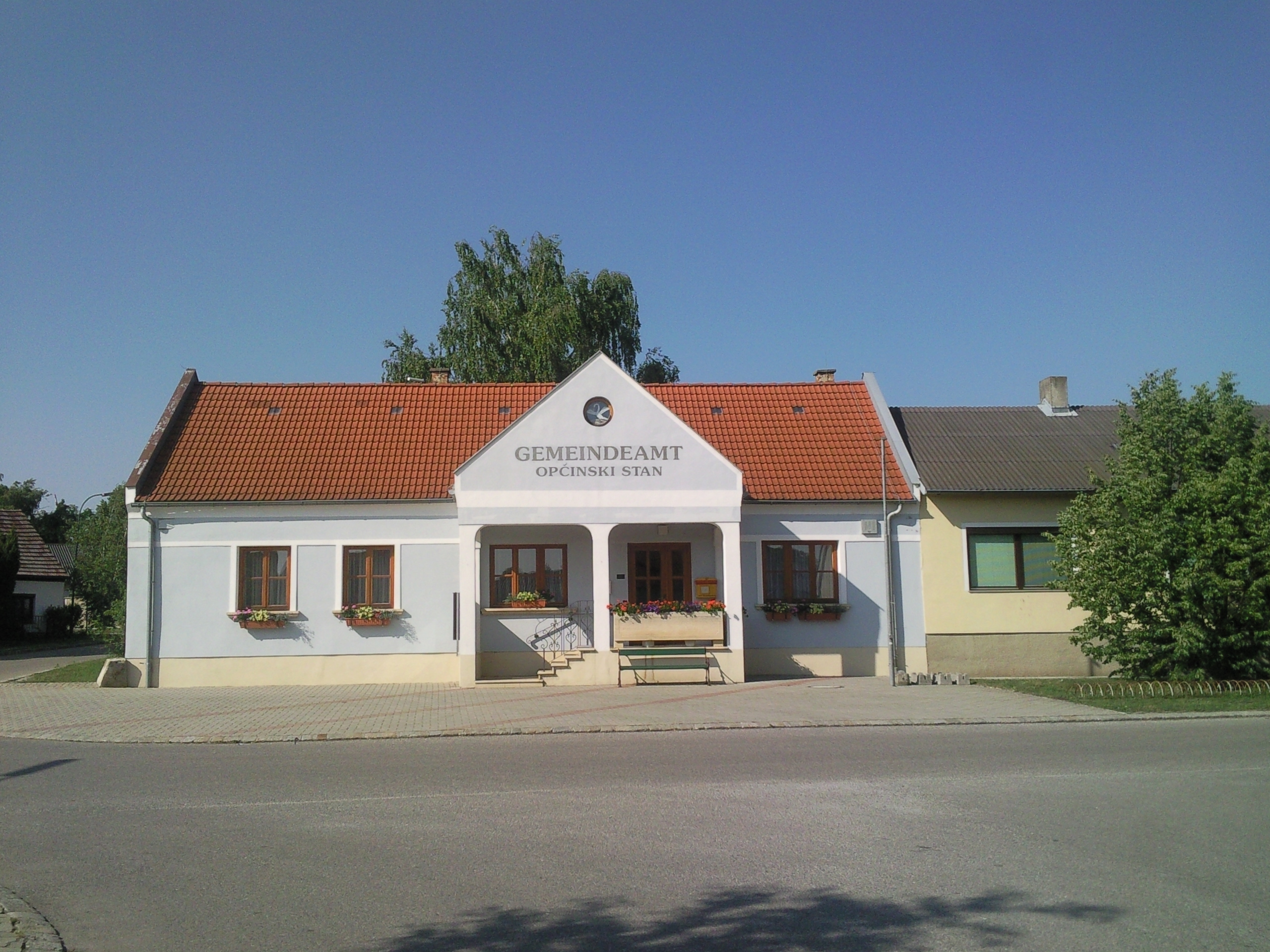
- Municipal office

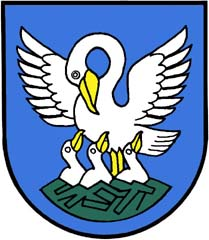
- Coat of arms

- Location within Austria
- Coordinates: 48°1′N 16°55′E
- Country: Austria
- State: Burgenland
- District: Neusiedl am See

Government
  - Mayor: Karel Lentsch (SPÖ)

Area
  - Total: 21.66 km^{2} (8.36 sq mi)

Population (2018-01-01)
  - Total: 720
  - Density: 33/km^{2} (86/sq mi)
- Time zone: UTC+1 (CET)
  - Summer (DST): UTC+2 (CEST)
- Postal code: 2475
- Area code: AT112
- Website: www.neudorfbeiparndorf.at

Neudorf (German pronunciation: [ˈnɔʏdɔʁf], lit. 'New Village'; Croatian: Novo Selo, lit. 'New Village', Hungarian: Mosonújfalu, lit. 'Moson New Village'), also known as Neudorf bei Parndorf (lit. 'Neudorf near Parndorf'), is a municipality and village in the district of Neusiedl am See in the Austrian state of Burgenland.

== Population ==
Historical population
Year	Pop.	±%
1869	1,092	—
1880	1,107	+1.4%
1890	1,024	−7.5%
1900	1,014	−1.0%
1910	1,040	+2.6%
1923	1,026	−1.3%
1934	1,083	+5.6%
1939	1,019	−5.9%
1951	902	−11.5%
1961	814	−9.8%
1971	748	−8.1%
1981	663	−11.4%
1991	653	−1.5%
2001	729	+11.6%
2011	714	−2.1%

== Personalities ==
- Simon Knéfacz and Mátyás Laáb, Burgenland Croatian writers.
