= Mosonudvar =

- Village/község
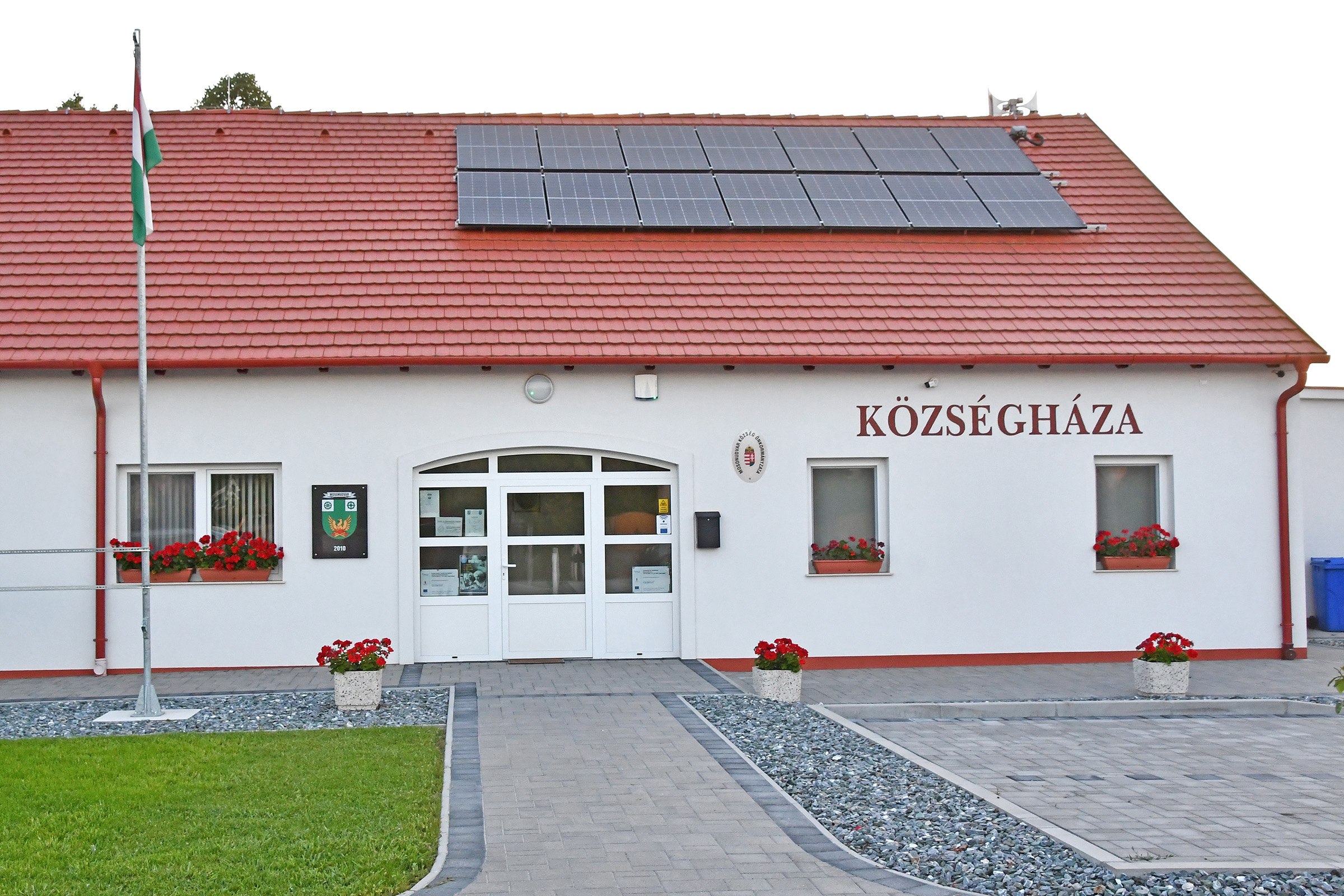
- Village hall

- Location of Mosonudvar in Hungary
- Coordinates: 47°50′25″N 17°13′43″E
- County: Győr-Moson-Sopron
- District: Mosonmagyaróvár

Government
  - Mayor: Rinczki Lajos András

Area
  - Total: 1.57 km^{2} (0.61 sq mi)

Population (1 January 2020)
  - Total: 417
- Time zone: UTC+1 (CET)
  - Summer (DST): UTC+2 (CEST)
- Postal code: 9246
- area code: 96
- Website: www.mosonudvar.hu

Mosonudvar is a village in Győr-Moson-Sopron County, Hungary.
