= Bezenye =

Bezenye Bizonja
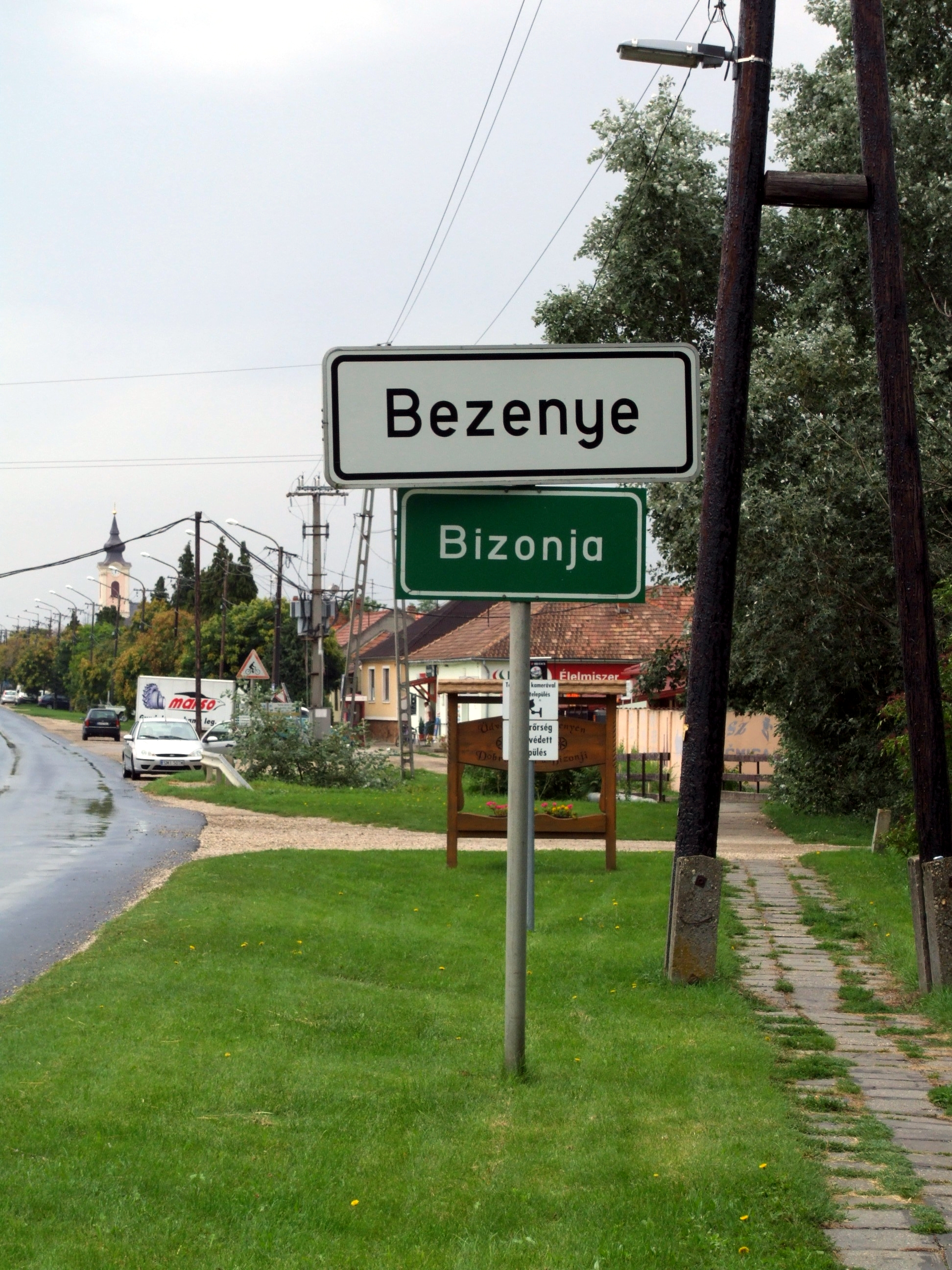
- Bilingual city limit sign

- Flag Coat of arms

- Location within Hungary
- Coordinates: 47.9617°N 17.2156°E
- Country: Hungary
- County: Győr-Moson-Sopron

Area
  - Total: 30.03 km^{2} (11.59 sq mi)

Population (2012)
  - Total: 1,393

Population by ethnicity (2011)
  - Hungarians: 80.2%
  - Croats: 30.5%
  - Slovaks: 9.0%
  - Germans: 4.4%
  - Other: 0.8%
  - Unreported: 12.9%

Population by religion (2011)
  - Roman Catholic: 66.0%
  - Calvinists: 1.0%
  - Other: 0.8%
  - Non-religious: 8.1%
  - Unreported: 24.0%
- Postal code: 9223
- Area code: 96
- Motorways: M15
- Distance from Budapest: 174 km (108 mi) Southeast

Bezenye (Croatian: Bizonja; German: Pallersdorf; Slovak: Beziň) is a village in Győr-Moson-Sopron County, Hungary. It is situated 6 km from the Slovak border and just 25 km from the Slovak capital Bratislava.

The population of 1600 consists mostly of Hungarians, with a large Croatian minority and smaller communities of Slovaks and Germans. Consequently, the inhabitants communicate in a mixture of languages, none of which are used in their standard forms.

Archaeological investigations reveal that the earliest inhabitants of the area were Germanic tribes. Many artifacts can be seen in the Hanság Museum in the town of Mosonmagyaróvár which is 25 km away, near Győr.

Later on Magyar people settled in Bezenye until it was sacked by Turkish troops. Gradually the village was repopulated, this time largely by Croatian communities from Dalmatia, as well as by Germans. The Germans called it "Palersdorf", the Croatians called it "Bizonja". The origin of the name Bezenye comes from a Slav word meaning "elder" tree ("baza").

The Germans occupied themselves with the production of saltpeter.

After World War II many of the poorer Germans were displaced to Germany. Several Hungarian families came to live in Bezenye, some of whom had been displaced from Slovakia. Request to include mostly Slavic village into Slovakia, together with Rusovce, Jarovce and Čunovo was not accepted.

The village has a small museum which chronicles the history of the village. The Roman Catholic church of the Blessed Virgin Mary holds services in Croatian and Hungarian. The village has a Croatian self-administration.

== Famous people ==
- Mátyás Laáb (1746-1823) Burgenland Croatian writer and translator
