= Jánossomorja =

Jánossomorja Sanktjohann, Sanktpeter
- Town
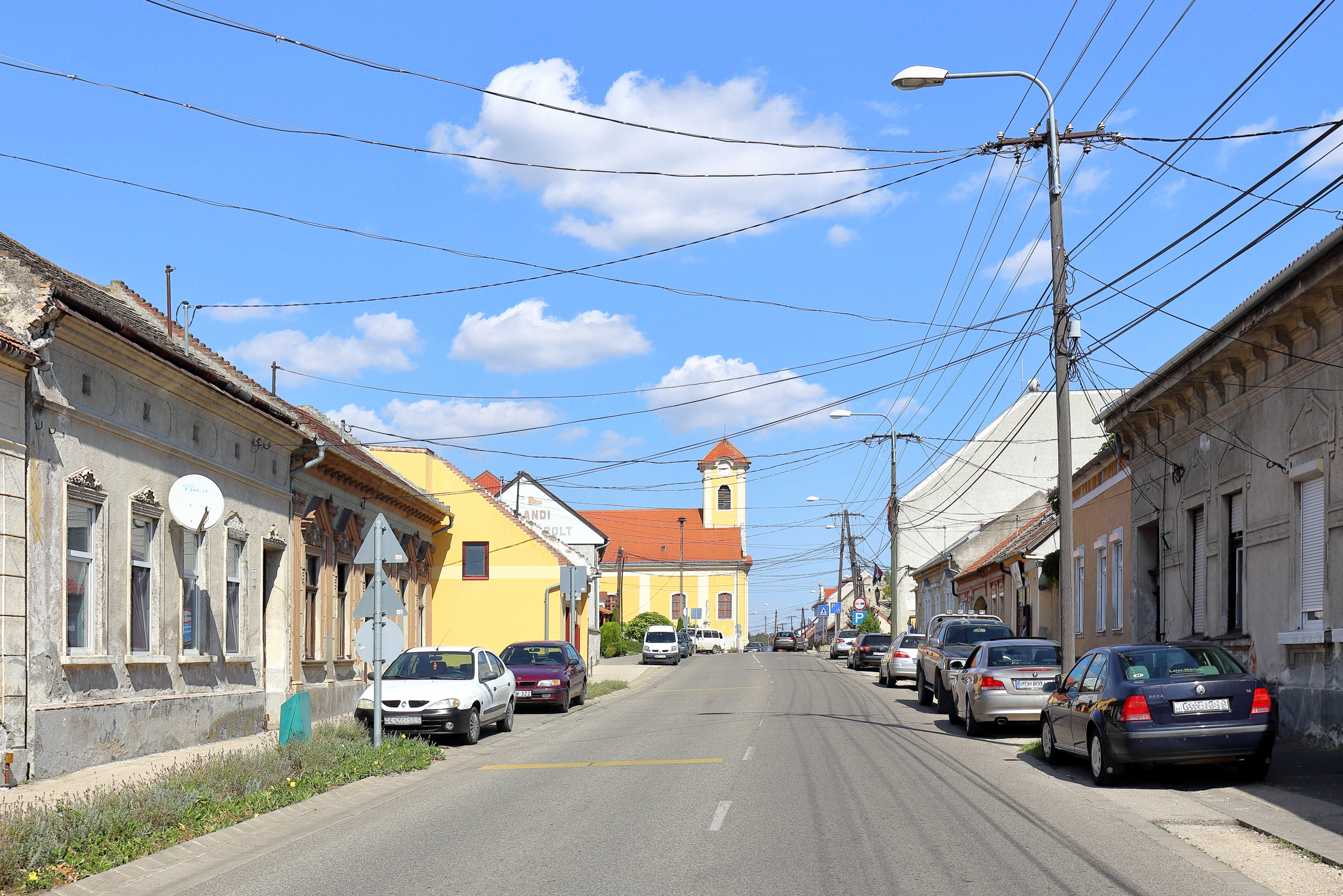
- Aerial view

- Flag Coat of arms

- Location of Jánossomorja
- Coordinates: 47.8000°N 17.1167°E
- Country: Hungary
- County: Győr-Moson-Sopron
- District: Mosonmagyaróvár

Area
  - Total: 148.94 km^{2} (57.51 sq mi)

Population (2019)
  - Total: 6,283
  - Density: 42.18/km^{2} (109.3/sq mi)
- Time zone: UTC+1 (CET)
  - Summer (DST): UTC+2 (CEST)
- Postal code: 9241
- Area code: (+36) 96
- Website: www.janossomorja.hu

Jánossomorja is a town in Győr-Moson-Sopron County, Hungary. It is a connection between the two villages Szentpéter (German: Sanktpeter) and Szentjános (German: Sanktjohann), located close to the Austrian border. Before 1946, those were German settlements with the German names St. Johann (St. John) and St. Peter.
