= János Manninger =

Hungarian photographer (1901–1946)

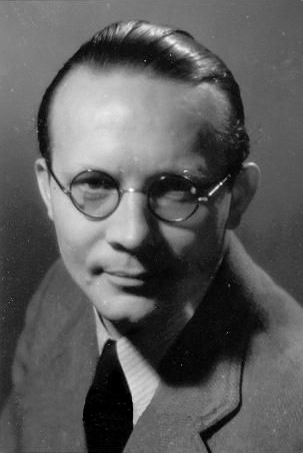
- Born: 12 September 1901; Magyaróvár, Austria-Hungary
- Died: 1 April 1946 (aged 44); Budapest, Hungary
- Occupations: Photographer, director

János Manninger (Magyaróvár, 12 September 1901 – Budapest, 1 April 1946) was a Hungarian photographer and director.

== Biography ==
He was born from his father János Manninger (1869–1923) and his mother Mária Szilágyi (1880–1960), a member of the Szilágyi family. Manninger was educated in Mosonmagyaróvár, his home town. He was a photographer at the Hunnia Film Studio before moving to Berlin, where he produced his first film Beinliche Angelegenheit in 1928. He later moved to London where he worked as a journalist, then went back to Hungary in 1944 and made the avant-garde film Kétszer kettő, which was banned by the Arrow Cross Party and after the war by Hungarian courts, as one of its characters, László Szilassy, was accused of war crimes. He therefore reshot some scenes of the film, but without success. Devastated, he committed suicide.

== Sources ==
- Magyar életrajzi lexikon IV.: 1978–1991 (A–Z). Főszerk. Kenyeres Ágnes. Budapest: Akadémiai. 1994. ISBN 963-05-6422-X
