= Mosonszolnok =

Mosonszolnok _{Zanegg}
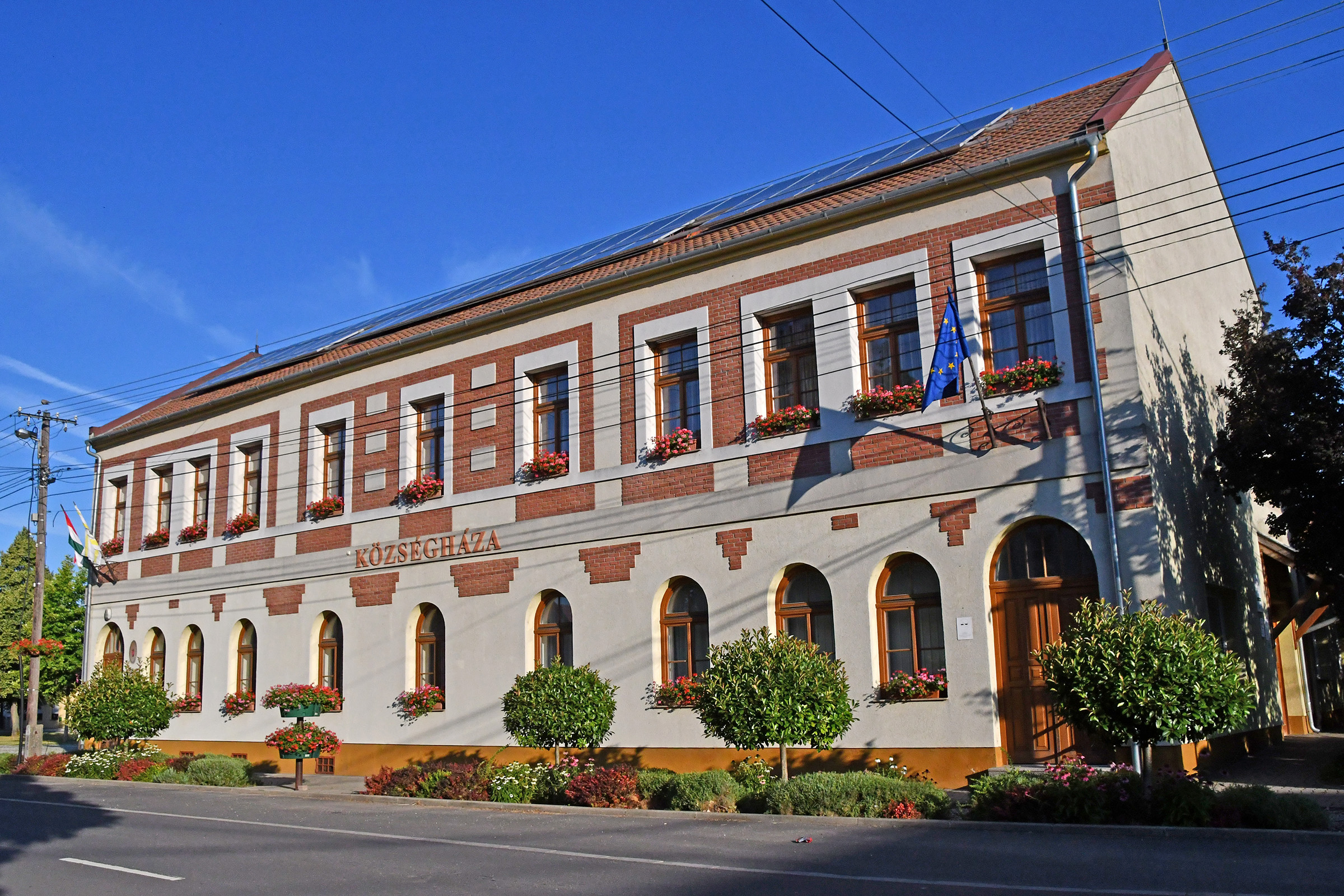
- Village hall

- Flag Coat of arms

- Location of Győr-Moson-Sopron county in Hungary

- Location of Mosonszolnok
- Coordinates: 47.85097°N 17.16847°E
- Country: Hungary
- County: Győr-Moson-Sopron

Area
  - Total: 43.93 km^{2} (16.96 sq mi)

Population (2004)
  - Total: 1,609
  - Density: 36.62/km^{2} (94.8/sq mi)
- Time zone: UTC+1 (CET)
  - Summer (DST): UTC+2 (CEST)
- Postal code: 9245
- Area code: 96
- Motorways: M1
- Distance from Budapest: 168 km (104 mi) East

Mosonszolnok (German: Zanegg), (Croatian: Canig) is a village in Győr-Moson-Sopron county, Hungary.

== Etymology ==
The name is of Slavic origin, most likely derived from Soľnik. "Soľ" (salt) + derivational suffix "-nik" meaning "salt store". Less probable theory is Slavic stavnik, literally "a stopping place" (a place to check goods and to exchange horses).

== See also ==
- Mosonszolnok Wind Farm
