= Slovaks in Hungary =

Magyarországi szlovákok Maďarskí Slováci
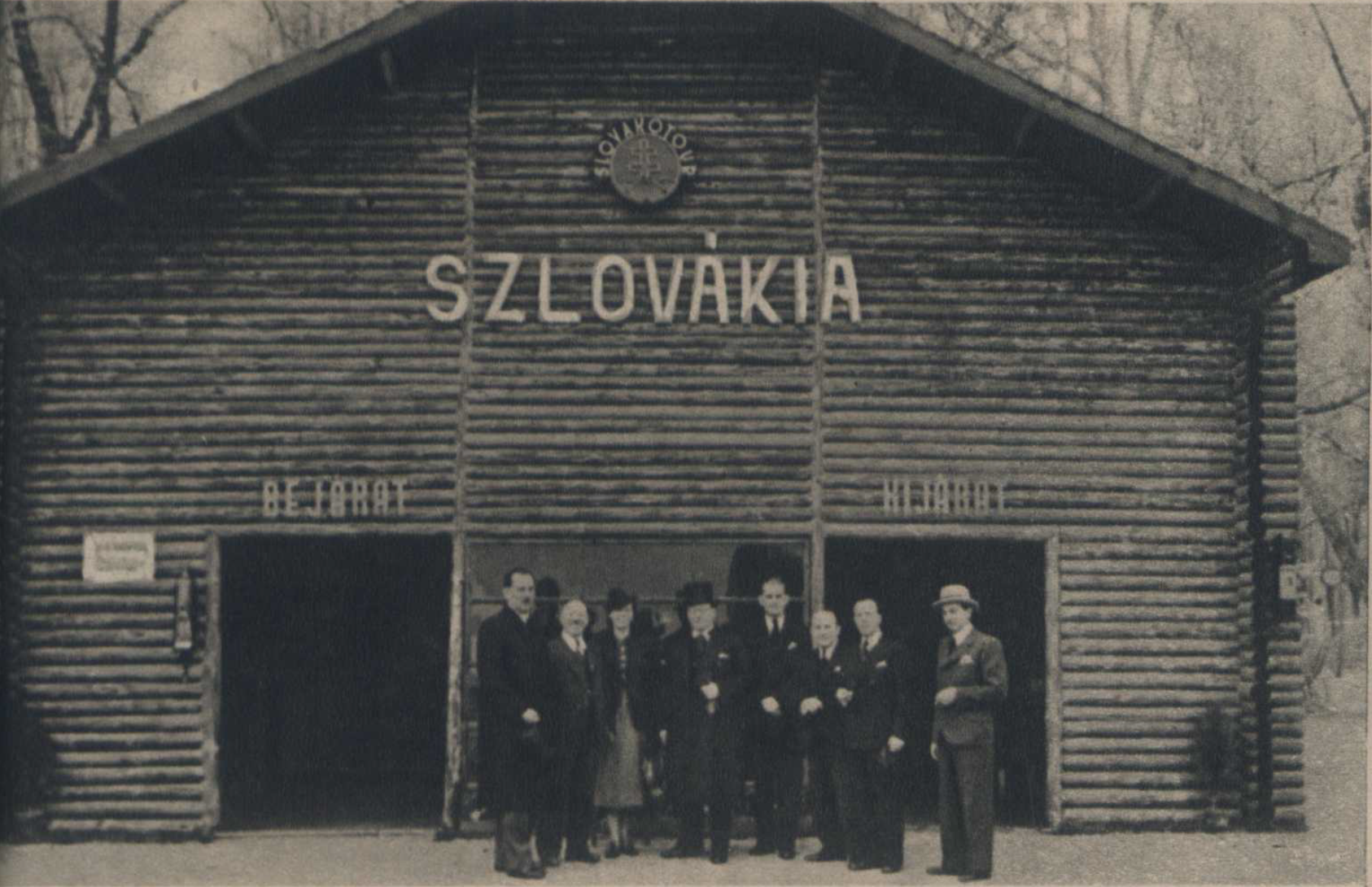
- Slovak pavilion at the 1940 Budapest International Fair

Total population
- 17,693 (2001 census); 29,794 (2016 microcensus)

Regions with significant populations
- Békés County: 5,482
- Budapest: 5,482
- Pest County: 5,184
- Győr-Moson-Sopron County: 4,707
- Komárom-Esztergom County: 2,086
- Nógrád County: 1,847
- Borsod-Abaúj-Zemplén County: 1,788

Languages
- Hungarian, Slovak

Religion
- Roman Catholicism, Lutheranism

Related ethnic groups
- Slovaks, Hungarians

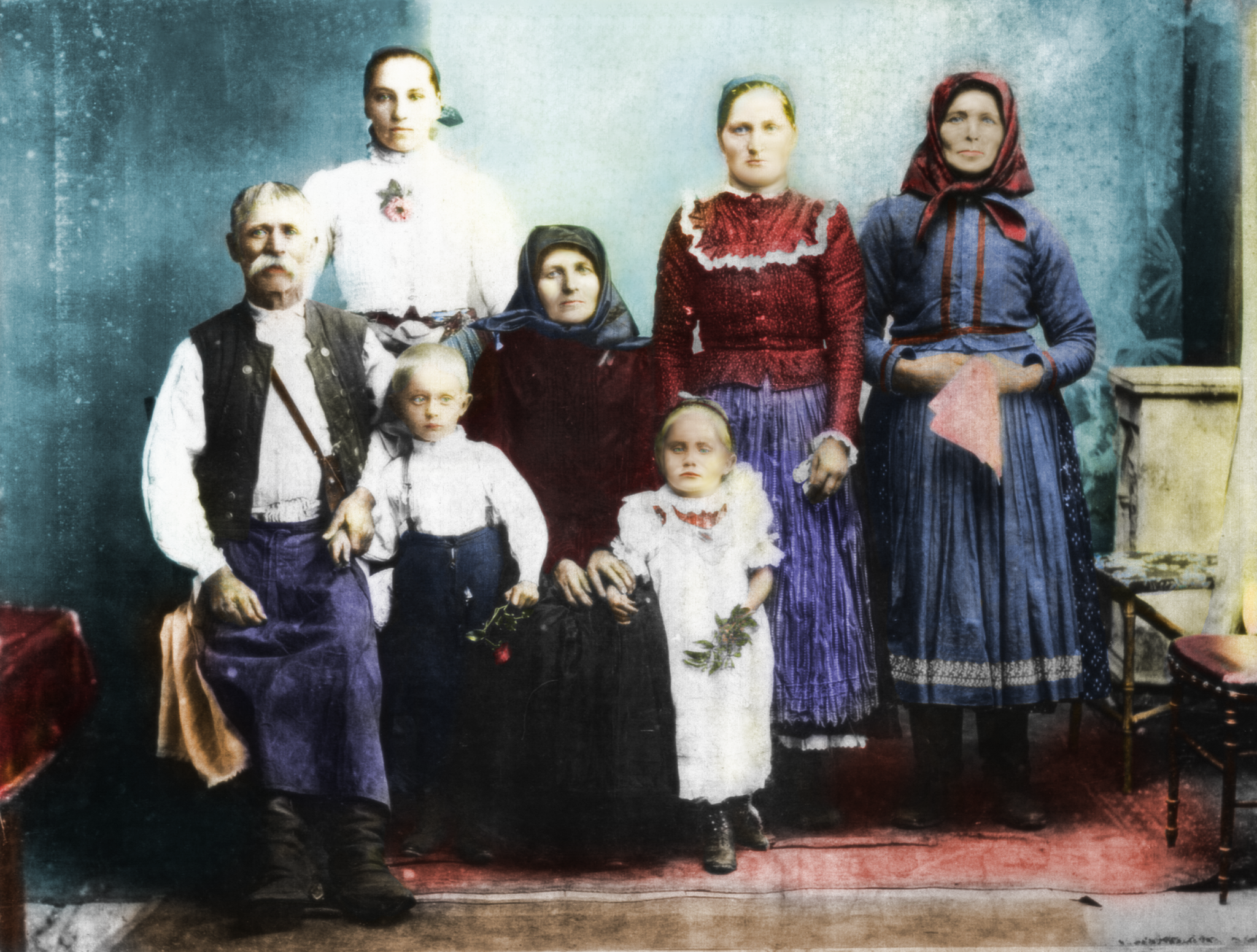
A Slovak family in Hungary (1907, Sátoraljaújhely)

Slovaks in Hungary (Slovak: Maďarskí Slováci, Hungarian: magyarországi szlovákok or magyarországi tótok) are the fourth largest minority in Hungary, after Romas, Germans and Romanians. According to the Microcensus in 2016, 29,794 Slovaks live in the country. The number of people who can speak the Slovak language is 56,107, but this also includes ethnic Hungarians from Slovakia. According to the estimates of minority organisations, the number of people with Slovak ancestry might be as high as 100,000-110,000. Hence, the estimated population of Slovaks in Hungary ranges from 0.18% to 1.1% of the total population, depending on the criteria.

== History ==
=== Early Middle Ages ===
The presence of the Slovak ethnicity in the territory of present-day Hungary dates back to the Middle Ages. In the 9th-10th century, the Slavic-populated territories were part of the Great Moravia. Subsequently, in the 9th century these areas were included into the Principality of Hungary out of which the Kingdom of Hungary emerged in AD 1000.

=== Renaissance ===
In the 16th century, after the Battle of Mohács during the Turkish wars, the Kingdom of Hungary was split into three parts and the Slovak-populated regions mostly became part of the Habsburg controlled Royal Hungary. After the Ottomans were defeated in the end of the 17th century, all Slovak-populated areas were included into the Habsburg Kingdom of Hungary. At that time, Slovaks mainly lived in the northern parts of the country, often referred to as Upper Hungary (today mostly Slovakia).

=== Age of Enlightenment ===
In the 18th and 19th century, some Slovak migrants started to settle in other counties (in the northern parts of present-day Hungary) and developed strong mutual language contact with the Hungarians and later also settled in the some southern regions. Following a period of Slovak demand for autonomy within Habsburg Kingdom of Hungary, conflicts between Slovaks and Hungarians arose.

=== After the Treaty of Trianon ===
According to the Treaty of Trianon from 1920, most of the Slovak-speaking territories of the pre-war Kingdom of Hungary were recognized as part of Czechoslovakia. Some Slovaks, however, remained within the borders of post-Trianon Hungary. According to Austro-Hungarian data from 1900 there were 192,200 Slovaks in the territory of present-day Hungary (2.8% of total population). According to the Hungarian census, 141,882 people spoke Slovak in 1920.

=== After World War II ===
The Czechoslovak–Hungarian population exchange that took place after 1920 was repeated after World War II when about 73,000 Slovaks resettled from Hungary to Slovakia.

== See also ==
- Slovak diaspora
- Ethnic groups in Hungary
- Hungarians in Slovakia
- Hungary–Slovakia relations
