= Hegyeshalom =

Hegyeshalom Straß-Sommerein
- Large village
- Coat of arms

- Location of Győr-Moson-Sopron county in Hungary

- Location of Hegyeshalom
- Coordinates: 47.91291°N 17.15444°E
- Country: Hungary
- County: Győr-Moson-Sopron
- District: Mosonmagyaróvár

Area
  - Total: 52.66 km^{2} (20.33 sq mi)

Population (2022)
  - Total: 3,756
  - Density: 71.33/km^{2} (184.7/sq mi)
- Time zone: UTC+1 (CET)
  - Summer (DST): UTC+2 (CEST)
- Postal code: 9222
- Area code: (+36) 96
- Motorways: M1, M15
- Distance from Budapest: 171 km (106 mi) Northwest

Hegyeshalom (Hungarian: [ˈhɛɟɛʃhɒlom]; German: Straß-Sommerein) is a village of roughly 3750 inhabitants in Győr-Moson-Sopron County, Hungary, on the border with Austria and less than 15 km from the border with Slovakia.

== Etymology ==
The name of Hegyeshalom originates from the two Hungarian words "hegyes" and "halom". The word "hegyes" means "mountainous" (or "piked") and the word "halom" means "pile" (or "hill").

== History ==
A charter given by Andrew II of Hungary in 1217 mentions the settlement as "Hegelshalm". After the Hungarian–Ottoman Wars, the town was settled by German Jewish settlers.

Near the end of World War Two, Hungarian officer László Ferenczy, who served as a liaison between Adolf Eichmann and the Hungarian gendarmerie, organized a death march of thousands of Hungarian Jews from Budapest to Hegyeshalom in order to construct a defensive line in Reichsgau Niederdonau. In addition to many of the Jews that had marched from Budapest, most of the Jews who had lived in Hegyeshalom would be murdered during the Holocaust in 1944 and 1945.

== Border crossing ==
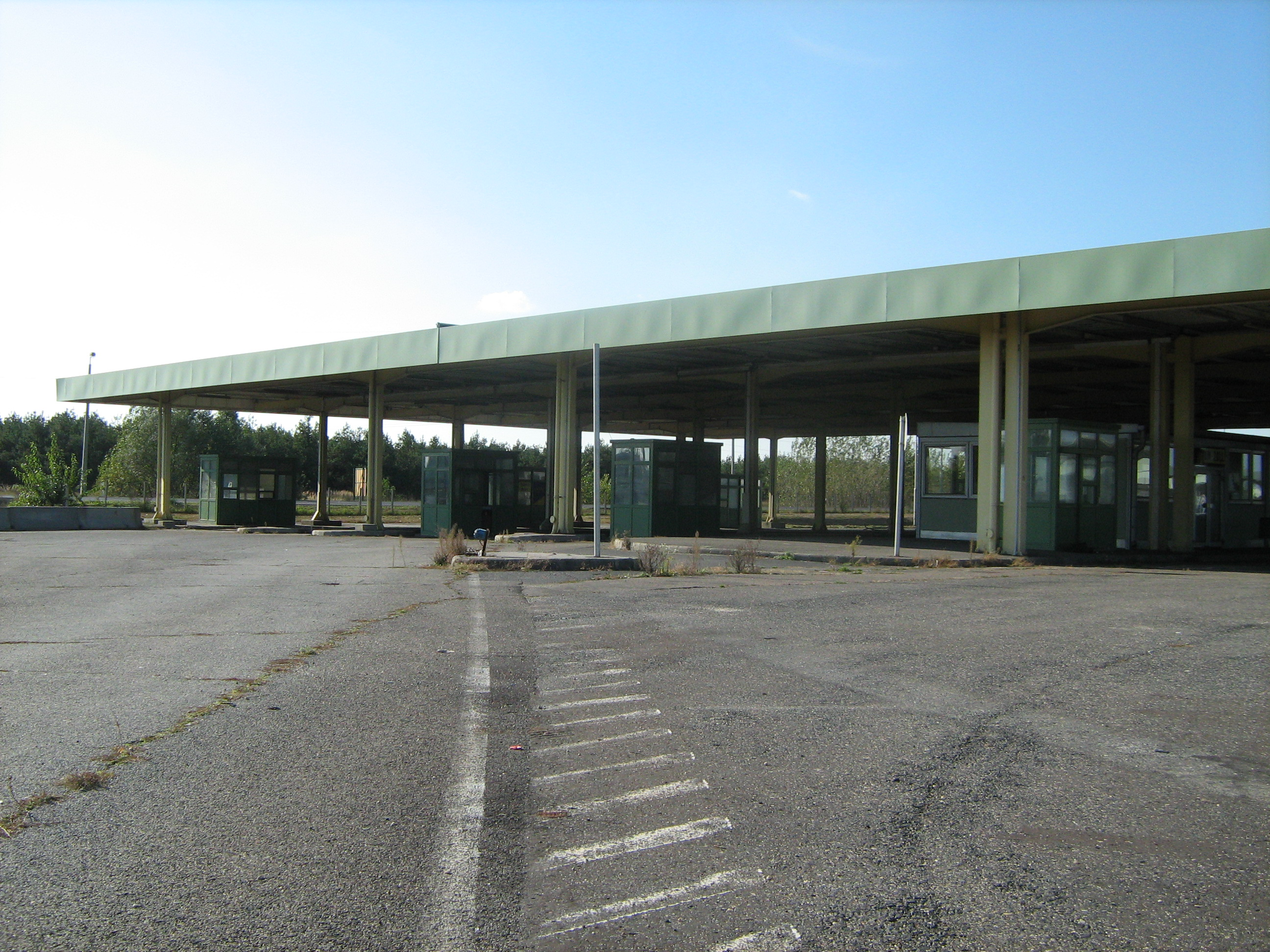
The abandoned Hegyeshalom border checkpoint

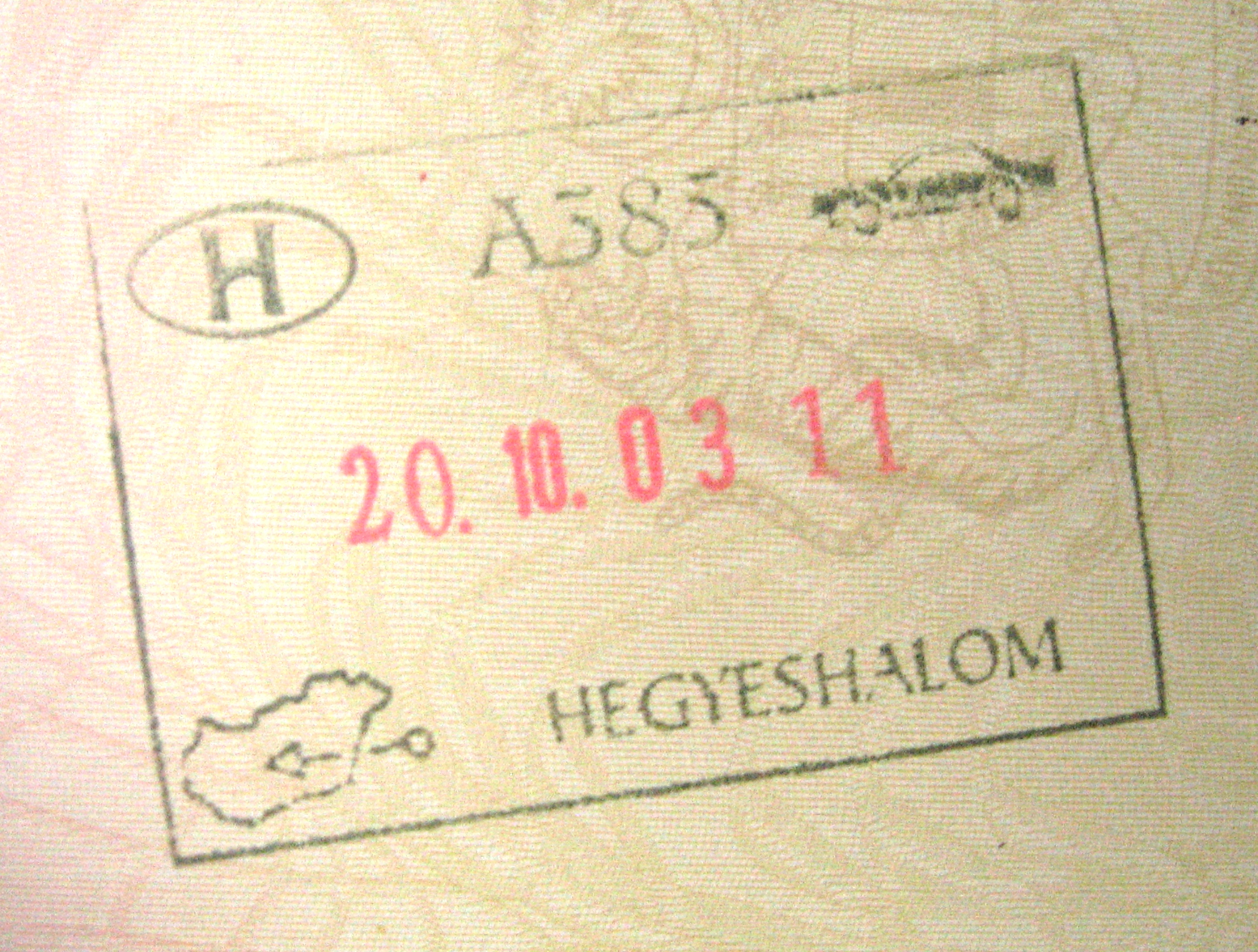
Pre-EU passport entry stamp from Hegyeshalom.

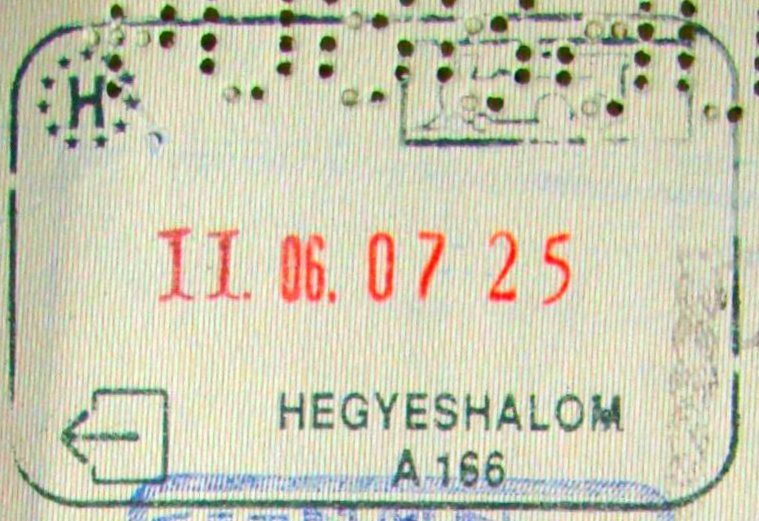
Pre-Schengen passport entry stamp from Hegyeshalom.

In May 1989, Hegyeshalom became one of the many sites of the fall of the Iron Curtain when Hungarian border guards tore down sections of barbed wire fences that separated Hungary and Austria.

Until 21 December 2007, at 00:00 CET, Hegyeshalom was an important border crossing and control point between Austria, Slovakia and Hungary. However, all border controls ceased at that time as Hungary as well as Slovakia joined the Schengen Area.

During the height of the COVID-19 pandemic in 2020, the border crossing at Hegyeshalom was temporarily re-opened following an agreement between Hungarian Minister of Foreign Affairs and Trade Péter Szijjártó and Austrian Minister for Foreign Affairs Alexander Schallenberg. As a result of this agreement, Hegyeshalom's border crossing was permitted to function and was the only border crossing between Austria and Hungary that allowed civilian transit and the transportation of international freight.

The Hungarian M1 motorway passes through Hegyeshalom. It connects with Austria's A4 motorway across the border at Nickelsdorf.

Hegyeshalom is also a railway border crossing point along the main railway line between Vienna and Budapest and the railway line to Bratislava. The station has a plinthed MÁV Class 411 steam locomotive.

== Sightseeing ==
The romanesque church was built in the Árpád age. The 13th century church was renewed in gothic style in the 15th century. On the eastern side stands the gothic tower with eightfold basic walls, while the upper part of it is fourfold, built in the 18th century.

== Famous people ==
- Zénó Terplán (born 1921), professor of the Budapest University of Technology and Economics and member of the Hungarian Academy of Sciences

== Gallery ==
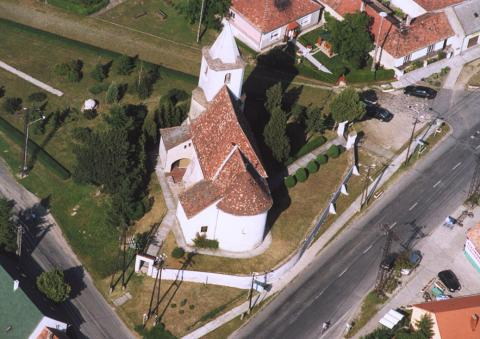

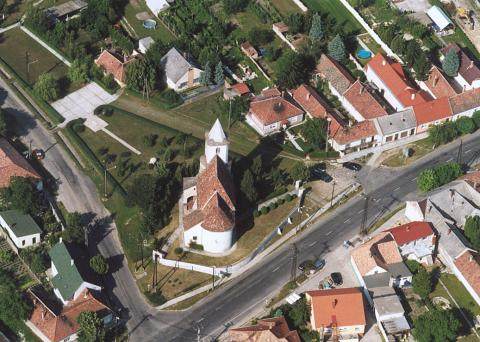

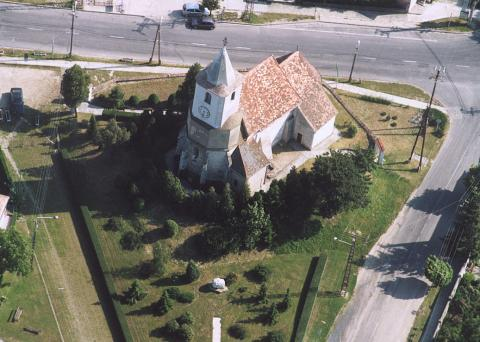

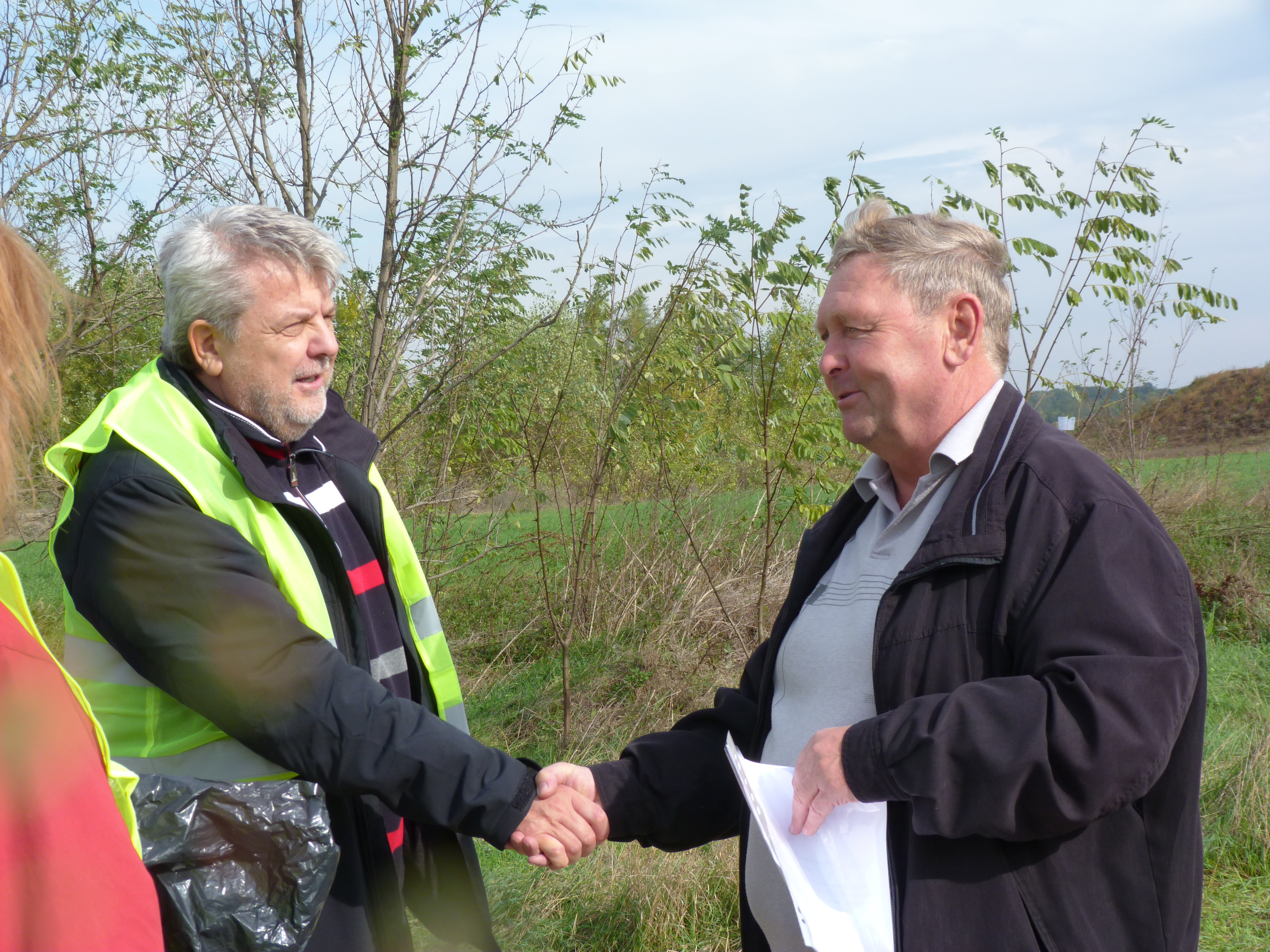
László Szőke, Mayor of Hegyeshalom
