= Mosonmagyaróvár =

Town in Győr-Moson-Sopron, Hungary

Mosonmagyaróvár Wieselburg-Ungarisch Altenburg
- Town
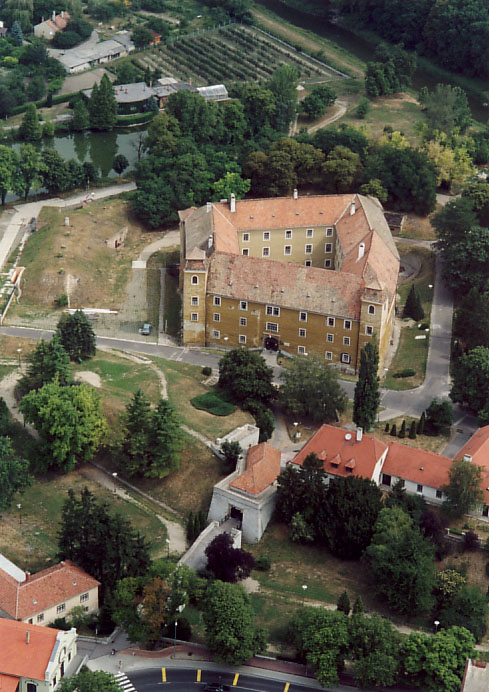
- Castle

- Flag Coat of arms

- Location of Mosonmagyaróvár Mosonmagyaróvár (Hungary)
- Coordinates: 47.87371°N 17.26873°E
- Country: Hungary
- County: Győr-Moson-Sopron
- District: Mosonmagyaróvár

Area
  - Total: 83.78 km^{2} (32.35 sq mi)

Population (1 Jan 2019)
  - Total: 33,954
  - Density: 405.3/km^{2} (1,050/sq mi)
- Time zone: UTC+1 (CET)
  - Summer (DST): UTC+2 (20CEST)
- Postal code: 9200
- Area code: (+36) 96
- Motorways: M1
- Distance from Budapest: 162 km (101 mi) Southeast
- Website: mosonmagyarovar.hu

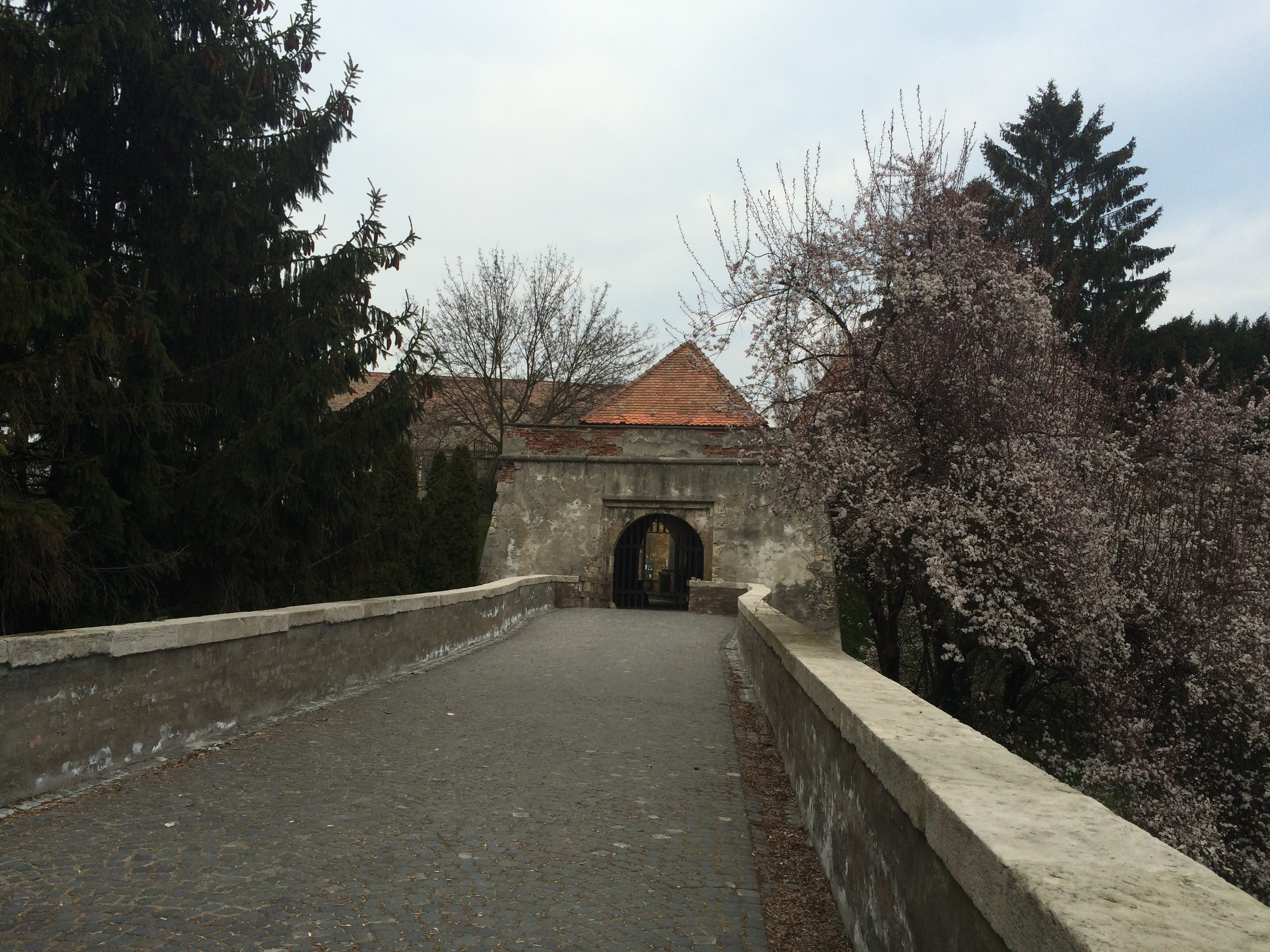
Castle at Mosonmagyaróvár

Mosonmagyaróvár (Hungarian: [ˈmoʃonmɒɟɒroːvaːr]; German: Wieselburg-Ungarisch Altenburg; also known by other alternative names) is a town in Győr-Moson-Sopron County in northwestern Hungary. It lies close to both the Austrian and Slovak borders and has a population of 32,752 (as of 2015).

Mosonmagyaróvár used to be two separate towns, Magyaróvár (German: Ungarisch Altenburg, Slovak: Uhorský Starhrad) and Moson (German: Wieselburg, Slovak: Mošon). The town of Moson was the original capital of Moson County in the Kingdom of Hungary, but the county seat was moved to Magyaróvár during the Middle Ages. The two towns were combined in 1939, and by now almost all signs of dualism have disappeared, as the space between the two towns has become physically and culturally developed. Due to the name's length, Mosonmagyaróvár is also referred to as Óvár amongst locals and Moson by foreigners. The Hansági Museum is located in Mosonmagyaróvár.

== Etymology and names ==
The name Moson comes from Slavic *mъšьnъ 'mossy', in the wider meaning also 'moss-covered mud, marsh', elided from mъšьnъ (gradъ) 'castle in the marsh' (see also Mšeno, Mszana). The settlement was attested in written sources as Mussun in 1137.

The name Magyaróvár literally means 'ancient Hungarian castle' in Hungarian, although the prefix Magyar- was only added to the name after confusion with a similarly named town in Austria called Deutsch-Altenburg (Hungarian: Németóvár), literally 'ancient German castle'). The "ancient castle" referred to in Mosonmagyaróvár is the ruins of the Roman fortress Ad Flexum. The settlement was attested in written sources as Altenburch in 1271.

The two names were simply combined when the two towns were administratively unified (as with Budapest), rather than being hyphenated as Moson-Magyaróvár.

The city is also known by alternative names in other languages: German: Wieselburg-Ungarisch Altenburg, Latin: Ad Flexum, and Slovak: Starý hrad.

== History ==
The area around Mosonmagyaróvár has been inhabited since the 5th millennium BC, but settlement of the city proper can only be traced to around the 1st century, which was when the Roman Empire was extended to the Danube, creating the province of Pannonia. The Romans established a camp called Ad Flexum (Latin: "towards the bend") at the site of Mosonmagyaróvár; it is likely that the Hungarians from the Árpád era would name the place Óvár due to the Roman ruins which would still be present during the 11th century. The purpose of Ad Flexum was to defend the Mosoni-Duna, but the security the legions provided also drew civilian settlement, especially since a major east–west trade route ran through the area. Circa 170 AD, Germanic barbarians who lived north of the Danube river attacked the settlement, nearly completely destroying it. The Romans reconquered the area around the 3rd century, and the town once again prospered, likely with a population of three or four thousand people. After the Emperor Valentinianus died in 375, Hunnic invasions drove the populace away.

After the Honfoglalás, King Stephen ordered the building of a castle at Moson to defend the border. Settlers flocked around the wooden and then stone castle, and by the 11th century it was described as a strong fortress and bustling merchant town; by this time, it was also the county seat of Moson. However, in 1030, the Holy Roman Emperor Conrad II was able to conquer the castle on his way to the Rába. During the Crusades, Kálmán, King of Győr and Moson, was able to defeat a Swabian-Bavarian army of 15,000 men from the castle. There was significant industrial and urban development during the 13th century, when Moson once again found itself along a trade route. Mills and churches were built during this time. All advances were destroyed, however, by Ottokar II, a Czech king, when he leveled the castle at Moson in 1271.

Béla IV, King of Hungary at the time, did not consider it worthwhile to try and rebuild the castle at Moson, and thus turned to Óvár as a promising site for a future fortress. The King gave a man named Conrad, who was of the Győr tribe, lands in Moson and funds to be able to accomplish this task. Though he made significant improvements to the castle, he defected to Ottokar II and Duke Albert of Austria. For this impunity, he was deprived of his lands, and from then on Óvár was an estate of the Hungarian queens. The first settlers to Óvár were refugees from the destroyed Moson, and in the 14th century it became a bustling city with new industry and urbanization. Mills along the Lajta became a source of employment and attention, as many were owned by the royal house. In 1354, Queen Elisabeth gave Óvár the title of "queen's town". This gave the townspeople the right to elect their own parish priest, have their own jurisdiction, inherit possessions, and pay no customs in all of Hungary. Later kings recognized these rights, but the townspeople still had to struggle to maintain them. After Louis II's marriage to Mary of Habsburg, Óvár became a key defense on the Austrian border, which would come into play during the Turkish invasion.

In 1529, after the Turks were repulsed at the Siege of Vienna, they destroyed Óvár almost completely, leveling all of its Medieval buildings, including the castle and the Romanesque church. The armies of János Szapolyai and the Archduke Ferdinand also sacked the town. However, once again the inhabitants went about rebuilding it. During the Reformation, the town was almost completely converted to Lutheranism, and the famous preacher Huszár Gal opened a Lutheran school at Magyaróvár in 1555. Counterreformative movements forbade Protestantism in 1672, closing down the school and the Lutheran church. Due to the lax nature of the new statutes, and the rights of the townspeople as enforced by Ferdinand and Archduke Maximilian, however, religion did not become compulsory. During this time, Moson and Óvár alike were attacked by various armies, including Turkish and German mercenaries. After the fall of Győr in 1594, the castle was modernized to withstand a possible future attack by Italian engineers. During the 17th century Magyaróvár enjoyed great urban development and some independence.

In 1683, the new castle was helpless against the retreating Turkish army, which had been repulsed again at Vienna. Both Moson and Magyaróvár were set ablaze. Though the town archives were now completely destroyed, the damage was repaired more quickly this time around, at least quickly enough to allow Rákóczi to use the castle as a base during his war for independence from the Habsburgs. In 1721, after the revolution was crushed, the castle at Magyaróvár lost its strategic importance, and all military materiel was transferred to Bratislava. However, the town prospered greatly after the war, with the establishment of new guilds, a town doctor, and the Piarist school. The Austrian government wished to limit the independence of the town, but the people were able to hold on to a degree of autonomy; an agreement to this effect was signed in 1796 after delegates had been sent to Vienna and Buda. In 1809, Napoleon's army demanded the town's provisions for his wars of conquest, and although this impoverished the people, they saved the town from destruction.

During the revolution of 1848, Magyaróvár and Moson both contributed to the fight for independence. On 23 October of that year, Kossuth Lajos made a recruitment speech in the town. The regiments skirmished with the Austrian troops but were sorely defeated. For the rest of the 19th century, the towns continued to grow. Factories, hospitals, schools, and other social institutions were established. In 1855, a railway station was built on the line from Győr to Bruck an der Leitha. This was a time of relative peace. In 1881 the town of Moson had 4,903 inhabitants, of which 3,583 were ethnic Germans and 933 Hungarians, meanwhile Magyaróvár had 3,427 inhabitants, made up by 2,125 Germans and 998 Hungarians. By 1908 there was already talk of unifying the two towns.

During the First World War, the Austrians maintained an armory in Magyaróvár. As a consequence of the Treaty of Trianon, most of Moson county was lost to non-Hungarian lands and all signs of the Habsburg rule were destroyed. What followed was another period of peace, during which time Moson and Magyaróvár were administratively unified as Mosonmagyaróvár. However, cultural differences, and even rivalry, were to persist well into the later twentieth century. During the Second World War, unemployment plummeted and the town's industry prospered. The town did not suffer much damage during the war; in 1946, its significant German population was deported. In 1948 bus services were created. During the later 1940s most of the town's institutions were nationalized by the communist regime. As many as 50 protesting civilians were killed during the revolution of '56, and the town was slow to recover. During the communist years, a new "town center" was developed between the existing Medieval centers of Moson and Magyaróvár, and there was significant development, including the opening of a university, new schools, and other public projects.

After the reestablishment of the current Representative Parliamentary Democracy in 1989, the Young Democrats controlled the city administration for a few years, expanding tourism and making developments to the gas and sewage infrastructure. Notably, the Piarist school was reopened.

== Climate ==
Mosonmagyaróvár's climate is classified as continental climate (Köppen Cfb). The annual average temperature is 10.9 °C (51.6 °F), the hottest month in July is 21.4 °C (70.5 °F), and the coldest month is 0.0 °C (32.0 °F) in January. The annual precipitation is 580.3 millimetres (22.85 in), of which June is the wettest with 66.6 millimetres (2.62 in), while February is the driest with only 28.8 millimetres (1.13 in). The extreme temperature throughout the year ranged from −22.0 °C (−7.6 °F) on 28 December 1996 to 39.4 °C (102.9 °F) on 8 August 2013.

Climate data for Mosonmagyaróvár, 1991−2020 normals
Month	Jan	Feb	Mar	Apr	May	Jun	Jul	Aug	Sep	Oct	Nov	Dec	Year
Record high °C (°F)	18.1 (64.6)	19.8 (67.6)	23.5 (74.3)	30.6 (87.1)	33.1 (91.6)	36.8 (98.2)	38.4 (101.1)	39.4 (102.9)	33.5 (92.3)	28.1 (82.6)	22.4 (72.3)	17.2 (63.0)	39.4 (102.9)
Mean daily maximum °C (°F)	3.1 (37.6)	5.9 (42.6)	11.2 (52.2)	17.5 (63.5)	21.9 (71.4)	25.9 (78.6)	27.9 (82.2)	27.6 (81.7)	22.0 (71.6)	15.8 (60.4)	9.2 (48.6)	3.7 (38.7)	16.0 (60.8)
Daily mean °C (°F)	0.0 (32.0)	1.8 (35.2)	6.0 (42.8)	11.4 (52.5)	15.8 (60.4)	19.6 (67.3)	21.4 (70.5)	21.0 (69.8)	16.0 (60.8)	10.6 (51.1)	5.6 (42.1)	1.0 (33.8)	10.9 (51.6)
Mean daily minimum °C (°F)	−2.6 (27.3)	−1.6 (29.1)	1.7 (35.1)	5.6 (42.1)	10.0 (50.0)	13.8 (56.8)	15.4 (59.7)	14.9 (58.8)	11.0 (51.8)	6.6 (43.9)	2.8 (37.0)	−1.4 (29.5)	6.4 (43.5)
Record low °C (°F)	−17.8 (0.0)	−20.2 (−4.4)	−13.8 (7.2)	−5.2 (22.6)	−1.1 (30.0)	3.0 (37.4)	6.8 (44.2)	6.1 (43.0)	0.4 (32.7)	−7.5 (18.5)	−12.7 (9.1)	−22.0 (−7.6)	−22.0 (−7.6)
Average precipitation mm (inches)	33.1 (1.30)	28.8 (1.13)	37.8 (1.49)	36.4 (1.43)	61.3 (2.41)	66.6 (2.62)	66.6 (2.62)	56.3 (2.22)	61.0 (2.40)	46.4 (1.83)	46.8 (1.84)	39.2 (1.54)	580.3 (22.85)
Average precipitation days (≥ 1.0 mm)	6.4	5.6	6.6	5.7	8.4	7.5	7.7	6.6	6.8	6.8	7.9	7.0	83.0
Average relative humidity (%)	81.1	74.8	68.9	63.4	66.2	65.6	65.0	66.8	72.9	78.6	82.6	83.2	72.4
Source: NOAA

== Dentistry ==
Dentistry appears to be by far the largest economical activity in Mosonmagyaróvár, with approximately 350 practicing dentists as of 2015. Worldwide, this is the highest number of dentists in ratio to the total population. The reason for this is found in the demand for low-cost dentistry by Austrians, who have been crossing borders to Hungary for decades. With Vienna nearby, Mosonmagyaróvár is within easy reach and official Hungarian government figures show that 160,000 Austrians cross the border yearly for dental care.

Compared to economically wealthy countries where dental care is expensive, low business overheads in Hungary allow clinics to offer their services at extremely competitive rates. Especially for low-income or uninsured patients, dental tourism makes Mosonmagyaróvár worth visiting.

Due to these factors, dental tourism has greatly grown in Mosonmagyaróvár. In addition to dentists, clinics and guided tour providers, the local hospitality industry as a whole lives off the dental tourist trade. With nearby international airports in Bratislava, Budapest and Vienna, Mosonmagyaróvár even attracts patients worldwide, travelling from as faraway as Greenland, Canada and the United States.

== Broadcasting ==
East of Mosonmagyaróvár at 47°50′19″N 17°17′49″E, there is a broadcasting station for AM and FM. The AM transmitter, which works on 1116 kHz with 2.2 kW uses as antenna a 106-metre-tall (348 ft) mast radiator, the FM-transmitter a free-standing lattice tower.

== Twin towns – sister cities ==
Mosonmagyaróvár is twinned with:

- Berehove, Ukraine
- Hattersheim am Main, Germany
- Neusiedl am See, Austria
- Olováry, Slovakia
- Pezinok, Slovakia
- Piotrków Trybunalski, Poland
- Šamorín, Slovakia
- Senec, Slovakia
- Sfântu Gheorghe, Romania
- Stockerau, Austria

== Notable people ==
- Carl Flesch, violinist
- Richard Hönigswald, philosopher
- Nikolaus Lenau, poet
- János Manninger, photographer and director
- Katalin Pálinger, handball player
- Antal Pusztai, classical guitarist
