= Markt Schwaben =

- Municipality
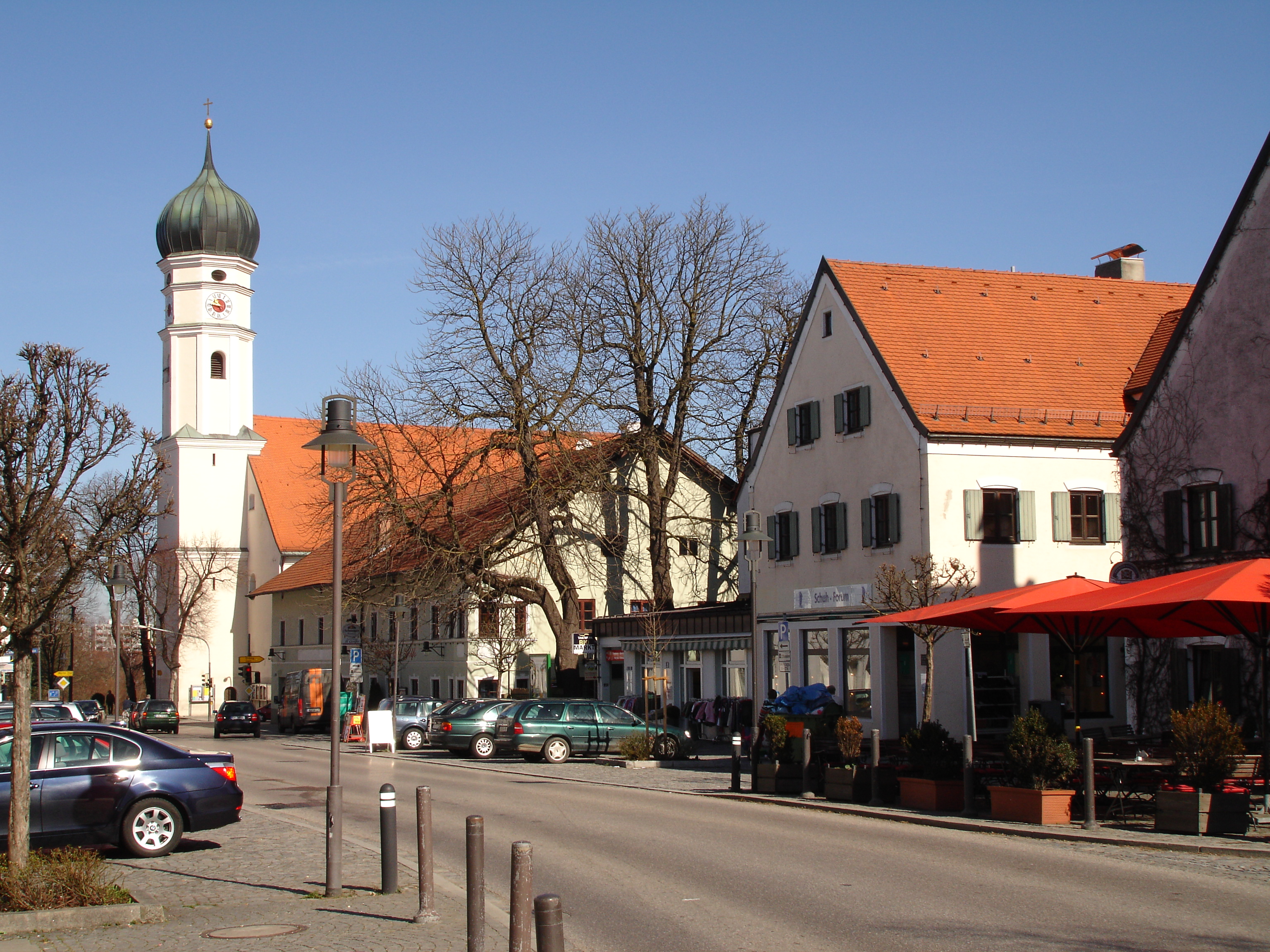
- St. Margaret's Church (seen from the marketplace)

- Coat of arms

- Location of Markt Schwaben within Ebersberg district
- Interactive map of Markt Schwaben
- Location within Germany Location within Bavaria
- Coordinates: 48°11′28″N 11°52′05″E
- Country: Germany
- State: Bavaria
- Admin. region: Oberbayern
- District: Ebersberg

Government
  - Mayor (2024–30): Walentina Dahms

Area
  - Total: 10.87 km^{2} (4.20 sq mi)
- Elevation: 509 m (1,670 ft)

Population (2025-12-31)
  - Total: 13,765
  - Density: 1,266/km^{2} (3,280/sq mi)
- Time zone: UTC+01:00 (CET)
  - Summer (DST): UTC+02:00 (CEST)
- Postal codes: 85570
- Dialling codes: 08121
- Vehicle registration: EBE
- Website: www.markt-schwaben.de

Markt Schwaben is a town in Bavaria, Germany. It lies roughly 23 km east of Munich on the northern edge of the Upper Bavarian district of Ebersberg. Neighbouring communities are Anzing, Forstinning, Pliening and Poing (all in Ebersberg district), as well as Finsing, Ottenhofen and Pastetten (all in Erding district).

== Geography ==
Through the town flows the Hennigbach, into which empties the Gigginger Bach southwest of Markt Schwaben. The River Sempt flows by to the east. The highest point in town is in the Wittelsbacher Höhe (heights) on the town's southern outskirts, which forms part of an alpine terminal moraine. Also in the south is the sport centre with its bathing pond. North of the railway tracks lie the Burgerfeld new town with its theatre hall, more housing estates and several commercial-industrial areas. The castle with the town hall, the marketplace and St. Margaret's Church are downtown, and the school centre somewhat southwest of there.

== Coat of arms and flag ==
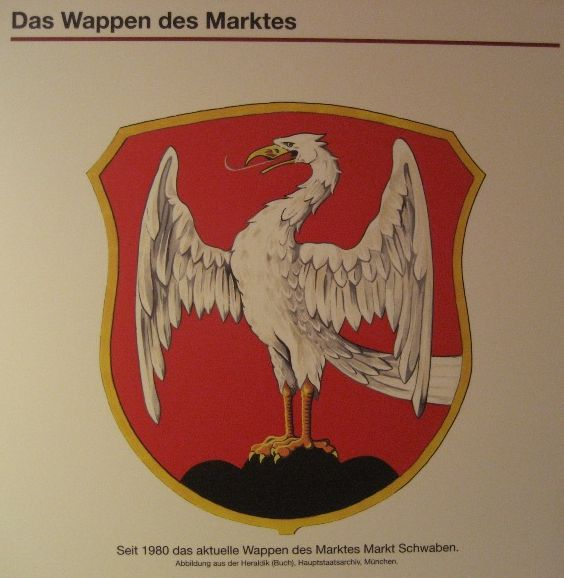
Coat of arms from Munich archive

Markt Schwaben's arms might heraldically be described thus: In gules upon a three-knolled hill sable a falcon with wings outstretched argent armed Or. The official blazon in German, however (In Rot auf schwarzem Dreiberg ein golden bewehrter silberner Falke), makes no mention of how the falcon's beak and tongue are to be coloured ("bewehrter" refers to the claws), and indeed, two variant coats of arms are in use. In one version, both are golden, and in the other, both are white. There is no official word as to which is right.

The flag bears a red and a white stripe with the coat of arms.

In 1409, Duke Stephan III of Bavaria-Ingolstadt granted the town the arms of the former County of Falkenberg, which had fallen back to the Dukes of the Wittelsbachers as liege lords about 1272 after the Counts of Falkenberg had died out, thus making their arms "free" to be given out again as the new owners deemed fit.

== History ==
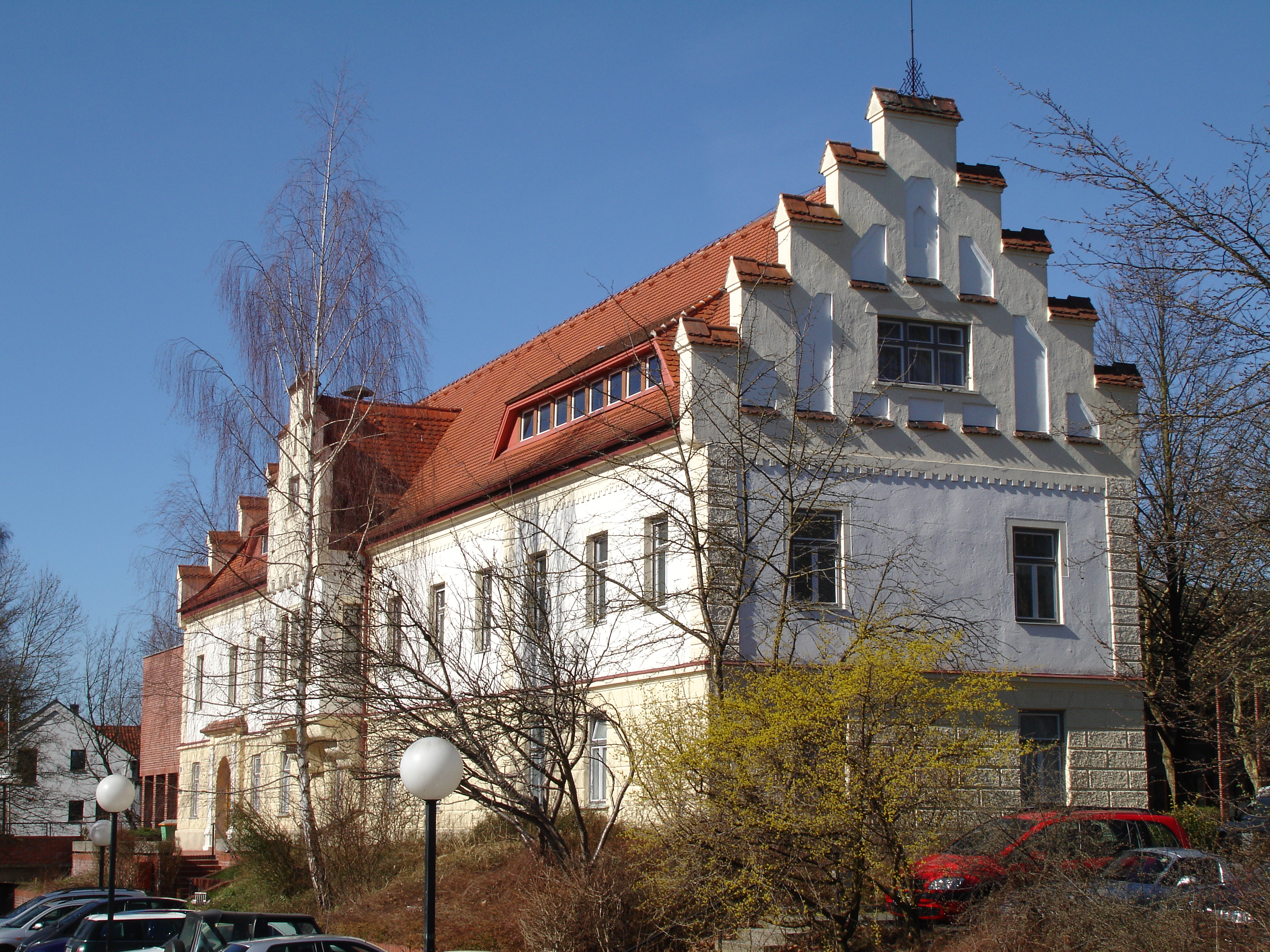
The old Markt Schwaben castle's remaining wing, nowadays part of the Town Hall

Markt Schwaben's history can be traced back to the 11th century. From this time comes a document witnessing the granting of a mill among the Swabians. The town gets its name from the settlers who came from the Alemannic region of Swabia.

First, the town of Schwaben found itself in the ownership of the Count of Ebersberg. It was then later owned by the Count of Limburg/Wasserburg and eventually the Lords of Neuburg-Falkenstein, finally passing to the Wittelsbachers. In 1283, Duke Ludwig the Strict of Upper Bavaria built a castle on a rise, as in those days, the old border between Upper and Lower Bavaria ran just behind Markt Schwaben to the northeast. The strategically well placed castle was destroyed many times, being built anew each time until in 1650 there arose on the spot a great, four-winged castle, whose south wing, made over in the neo-Gothic style in 1908, is still maintained today in the middle of town. The rest of the castle was torn down in 1812 (east and north wings together with the St. Magdalenenkapelle and the "bridgehouse") and 1969 (west wing and southwest corner) owing to decaying building materials and reasons of cost. The community acquired the property in 1967 and incorporated it into a new community centre and town hall. The castle's former moat can still be made out in the south and west. In 1340, Markt Schwaben was granted market rights by Duke Rudolf. Through this and village status the town blossomed further and eventually boasted a state court seat – at the Electoral palace. In 1805, the last "blood court" sentence was imposed, as a result of which two murderers from Grafing were beheaded in the Galgenhölzl. In 1811, the court was moved to Ebersberg, leaving the town to suffer for a long time under the threat of sinking into insignificance.

After the Second World War came a great inflow of Germans driven from their lands in the east, some of whom settled in Markt Schwaben. This is recalled by some street names in the town's southwest, such as Königsberger Straße, Neusatzer Straße and Ödenburger Straße.

At this time, the population mostly drew together and worked to provide the market and the outlying villages with products. Many streets were named after these industrious citizens, such as Weißgerberweg ("Tawer Way"), Kupferschmiedberg ("Coppersmith Hill") and Nagelschmiedgasse ("Nailsmith Lane").

Since the community decided in 1922 to include the designation Markt in its name, the town's official name is Markt Markt Schwaben. Under the Bavarian government led by Wilhelm Hoegner, a number of market towns were raised to city status, among them Grafing and Ebersberg but the word "Markt" in the town's name at that time thwarted the community's efforts to be raised to city status.

In the 1960s, as everywhere else in the Munich suburban area, a building boom happened in Markt Schwaben, leading to two highrise developments in the town (von-Kobell-Straße and Dr. Hartlaubring). Postcards from the time describe the community as a "residential area in east Munich". Connection to the Munich local transport network (MVV) for the Olympics in 1972 afforded the town something of a boom, as there now was a quick route into the city in addition to the regional service. In 1990, the Autobahn interchange was finished.

In 1992 and 1993, the Sportpark with the bathing pond was built in the southeast of the town as an addition to and partial replacement for the older sports area close to the schools.

== Religion ==
In Markt Schwaben stand a Catholic church and an Evangelical Lutheran church. Moreover, the League of Free Evangelical Communities in Germany is also present, and there is a Turkish mosque.

In 1315 there was a Romanesque church in Schwaben built out of brick. In 1474 a small Gothic church was consecrated. It was already known as Saint Margaret's at that time. In 1671, building work was begun on the new Pfarrkirche St. Margaret (Saint Margaret's Parish Church) 20 metres southeast of its forerunner. The work took ten years. The first set of bells consisted of three new (in 1684) ones and one other taken from the old church (1585). In 1704, the Rosenkranzbruderschaft – the "Rosary Brotherhood", a lay Dominican order – endowed the Marienaltar ("Mary's Altar"). In 1718 the Jungfrauenaltar ("Virgins' Altar", with Saints Agatha, Barbara and Catharine), the Josefialtar ("Joseph's Altar") and the Antoniusaltar ("Anthony's Altar") were built. The brewer Trappentreu had the high altar installed in 1723 with a new top and tabernacle, all richly gilt. In 1862 the church was renovated, at which time the original high altarpiece was removed. Its whereabouts remain unknown to this day. In 1873 a new organ was built. The country couple Hundseder endowed a complete new set of bronze bells in 1911, poured at the bellworks in Erding with the "Salve Regina" motif in the arrangement D - F# - A - B. While the church managed to keep its bells in the First World War, in 1942 they were seized and melted down for war requirements. In 1948 the parish church received a substitute set of bells poured from steel in Bochum, with the same tonal arrangement as the old ones, which is still in use today. In 1975 came yet another, quite extravagant, restoration, whereby the church's south side, facing Erdinger Straße, had to be deeply underpinned owing to the vibration from traffic. In the mid-1990s, the church tower was threatening to tear away from the nave. A woodworm infestation was successfully dealt with in 1999. As of 2015 a further expensive restoration is expected as the stuccoed vault is showing threatening cracks apparently caused by bell vibrations.

On 22 May 1955, the Evangelical Philippuskirche with its vicarage was consecrated in the town's northeast. In 1962, the parish vicariate became a parish in its own right. In 1967, the church received an organ. In 1976, another community centre was added to the church. In 2005 the church was renovated.

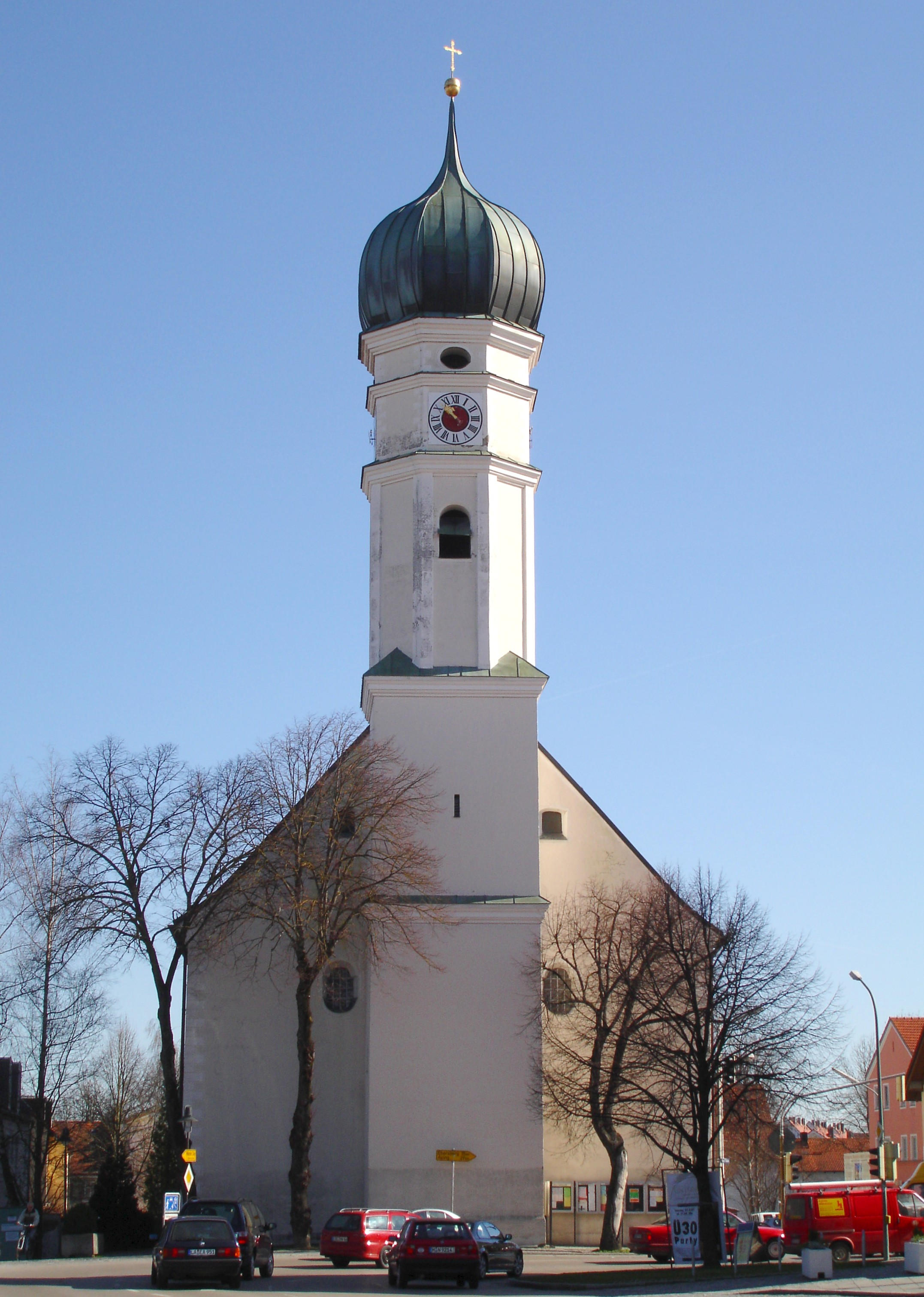
Catholic Parish Church of St. Margaret

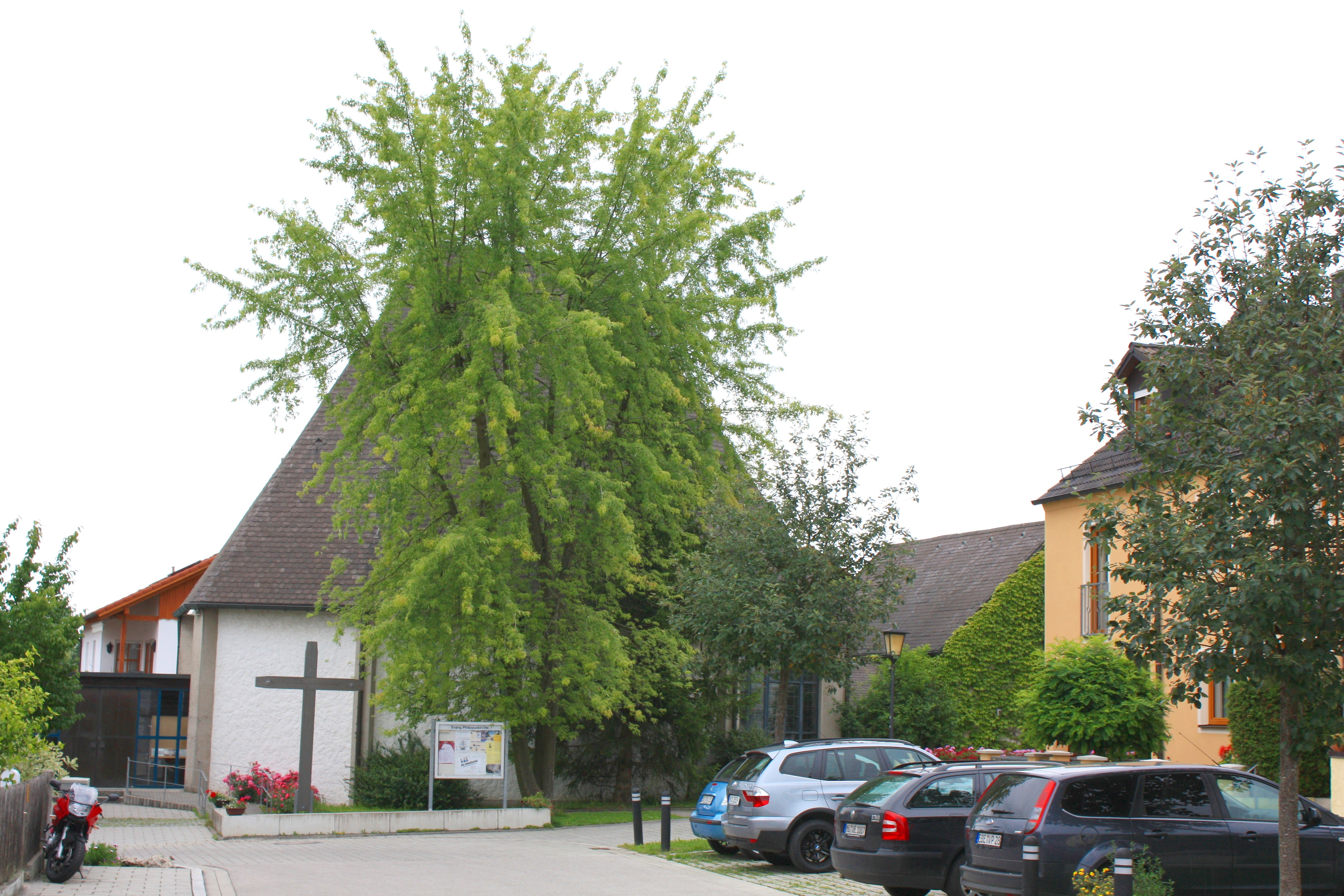
Evangelical Phillipus Church

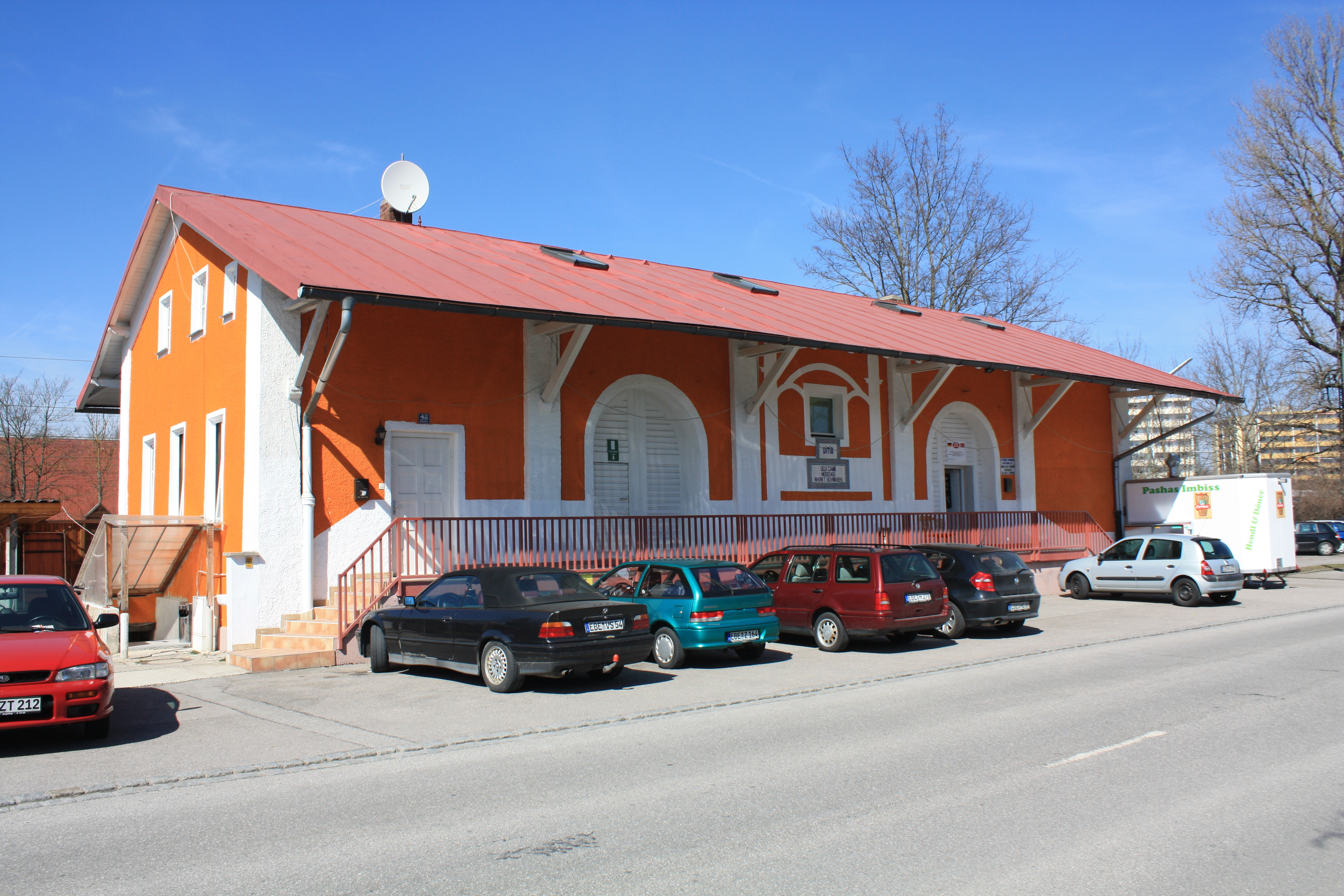
Ulu Camii mosque

== Politics ==
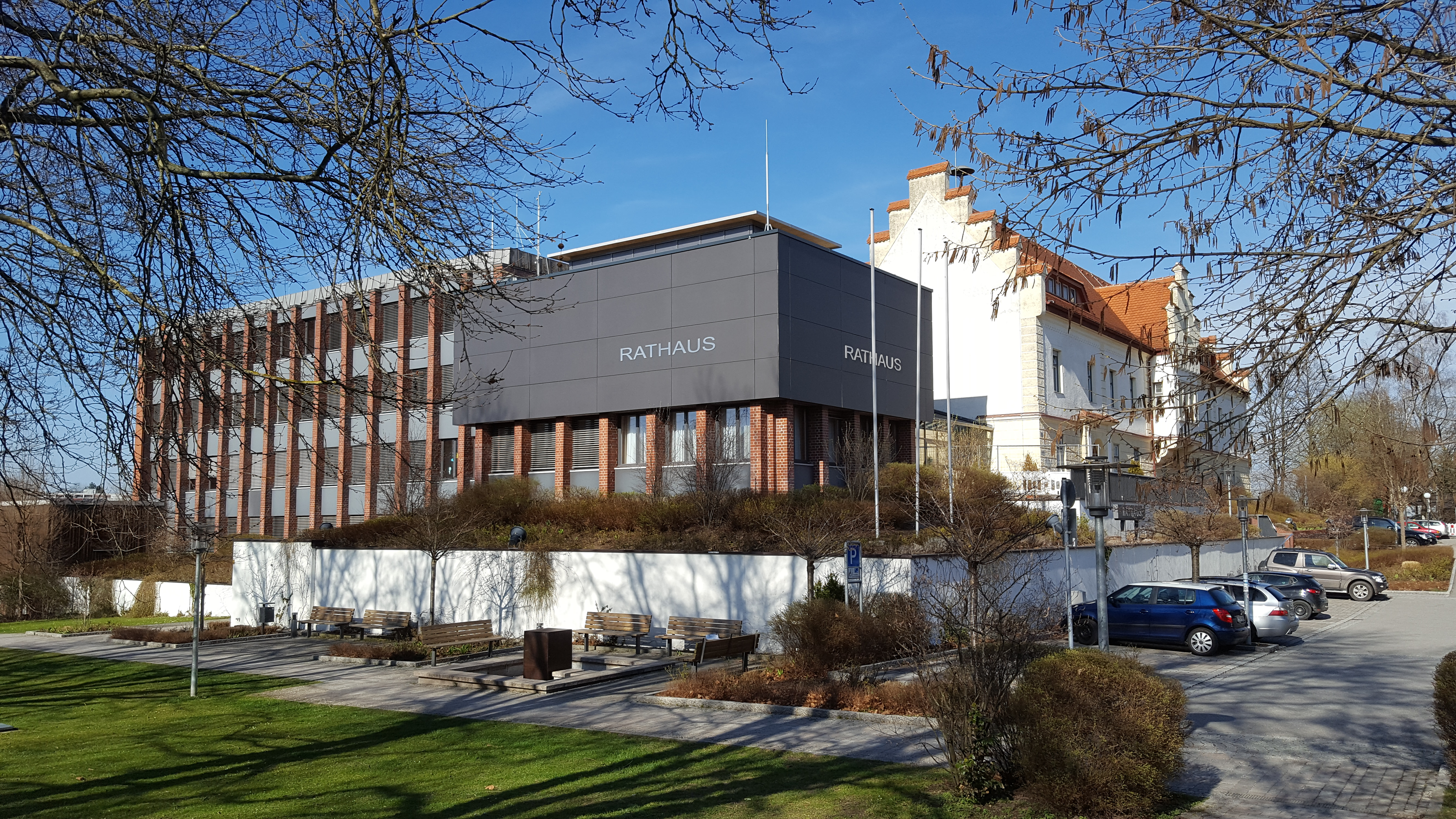
The town hall with its modern part and the wing of the old castle

From 2002 to 2011, Markt Schwaben's principal mayor was Bernhard Winter (SPD). The second and third mayors are Bernd Romir (Freie Wähler) and Albert Hones (CSU, since 2008) respectively. Winter resigned preterm on 1 March 2011. In the elections for a new mayor on 13 March 2011, Georg Hohmann (SPD) was elected. He was re-elected again on 16 March 2014. In March 2020 Michael Stolze was elected mayor.

As of 2014, 24 members (in addition to the mayors) belong to the market town's council, of whom 8 are CSU members, 6 SPD, 5 Freie Wähler, 3 Greens and 2 members of the factionless voter's association "Zukunft Markt Schwaben" (ZSM) ("Future Markt Schwaben").

== Twin towns ==
- Ostra, Italy, since 25 October 2003

== Economy ==
=== Transport ===
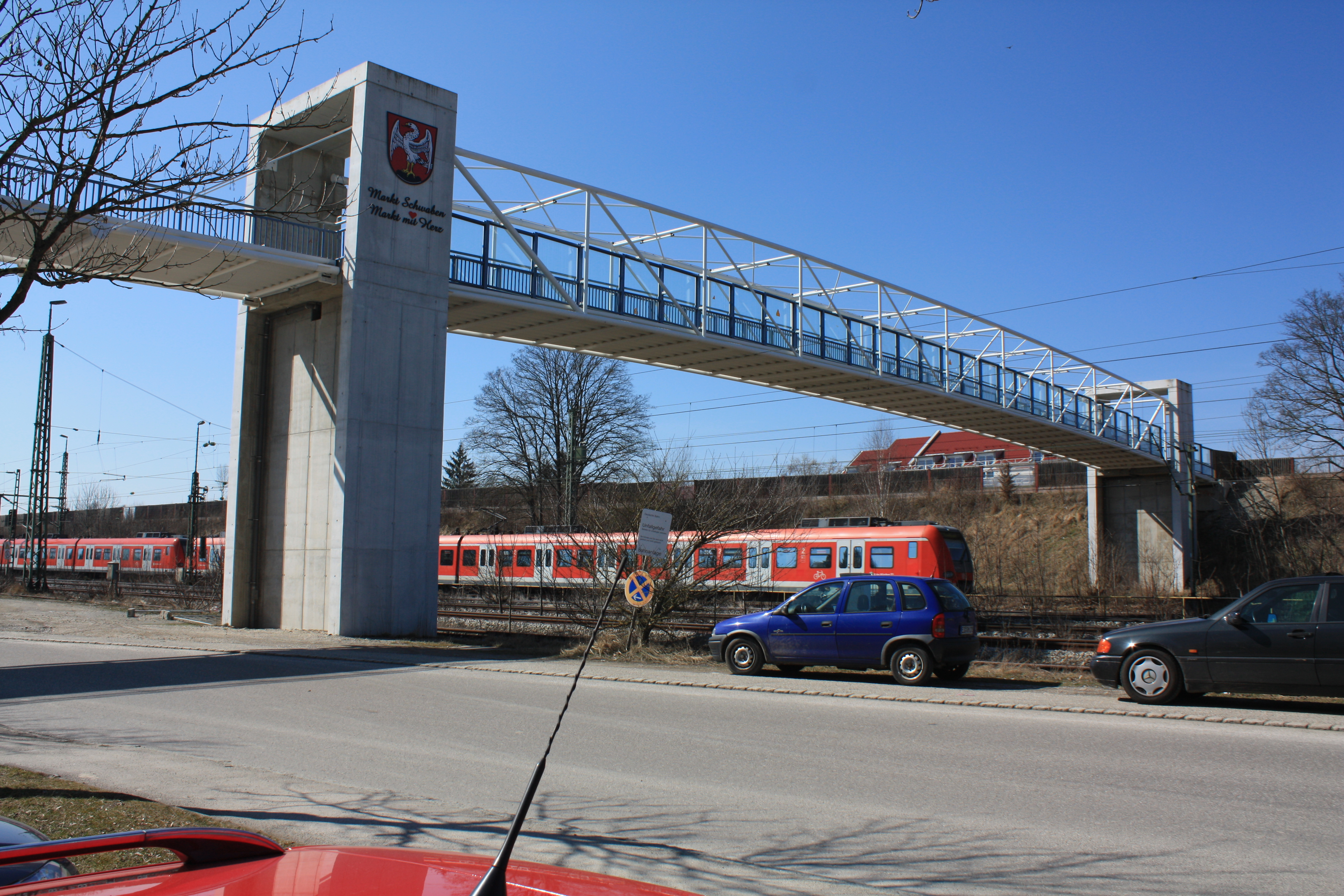
Footbridge over railways

Markt Schwaben is well connected by way of transport.

The railway line from Munich to Mühldorf carries both regional and S-Bahn trains (line S2 of the Munich Transport and Tariff Association) to Markt Schwaben. The S-Bahn can reach Munich's East Railway Station (Ostbahnhof) in about 20 minutes and Marienplatz in about 30. In the morning rush hour, the S-Bahn runs express trains at 20-minute intervals that between Markt Schwaben and the East Railway Station only stop at Riem. These trains are supposed to lighten the regular S-Bahn trains' load, since according to Deutsche Bahn, 10-minute intervals, commonplace on other S-Bahn lines during rush hour, cannot be introduced on this line. The express S-Bahn service is still undergoing testing. Thus far, the dearth of signage and the danger for passengers on the platforms when express trains pass by without stopping have been being criticized. Also, the regular S-Bahn trains have been shortened by a few coaches, which despite the lighter passenger loads are still overfull.

By way of Bundesautobahn 94 from Munich to Passau, completed through to the Forstinning interchange in 1990, drivers can reach the expressway junction München-Ost (Munich-East, to Salzburg, Nuremberg and Stuttgart) and Munich city limits in the east. Coming from the east, the interchange for Markt Schwaben is the one at Forstinning, and coming from the west it is Anzing. With the completion of the Flughafentangente Ost, a relief road which is to connect the Autobahn with Munich Airport, some relief from through traffic was achieved.

=== Established businesses ===
The large commercial-industrial area in the town's northwest is home to several big firms, among them the specialized wholesale business Wilhelm Gienger and the head office of the firm Seidenader, which builds machines for the pharmaceutical industry. In the south on Ebersberger Straße is the Schweiger private brewery with its attached brewery inn. The market town moreover has at its disposal a post office, three filling stations, three banks and five supermarkets. A further supermarket is planned for Erdinger Straße. There are also many inns, craft businesses and retail shops.

== Public institutions ==
=== State institutions ===
In 2006 the scientific department of the Zolltechnischen Prüfungs- und Lehranstalt (ZPLA – Customs-Technical Examination and Teaching Institution) was established in Markt Schwaben. This is an authority of the Bundeszollverwaltung (Federal Customs Administration).

=== Educational institutions ===
Markt Schwaben has four schools:

- Grundschule Markt Schwaben (elementary school, built 1978)
- Volksschule Markt Schwaben (built 1971 with extensions to 1972)
- Lena Christ Realschule (built 1973/74)
- Franz-Marc-Gymnasium (built 1973)

=== Offices ===
Municipal offices are found at the town hall.

=== Sport and leisure ===
Sporting facilities:

- Sport centre with: grass playing field, running tracks, two training squares (one grass, one artificial turf), exercise and gymnastic field, tennis court, summer "stock" rinks, four bowling alleys, bathing pond and sporting inn.
- Jahnsportplatz with all-weather square and playing field
- BSG-Sportplatz with playing field and pitching place
- Ausweichsportplatz
- Tennis court on Hauser Weg (clubhouse burnt down in December 2005)
- Indoor swimming pool with sauna and solarium

== Culture and sightseeing ==
=== Theatre ===
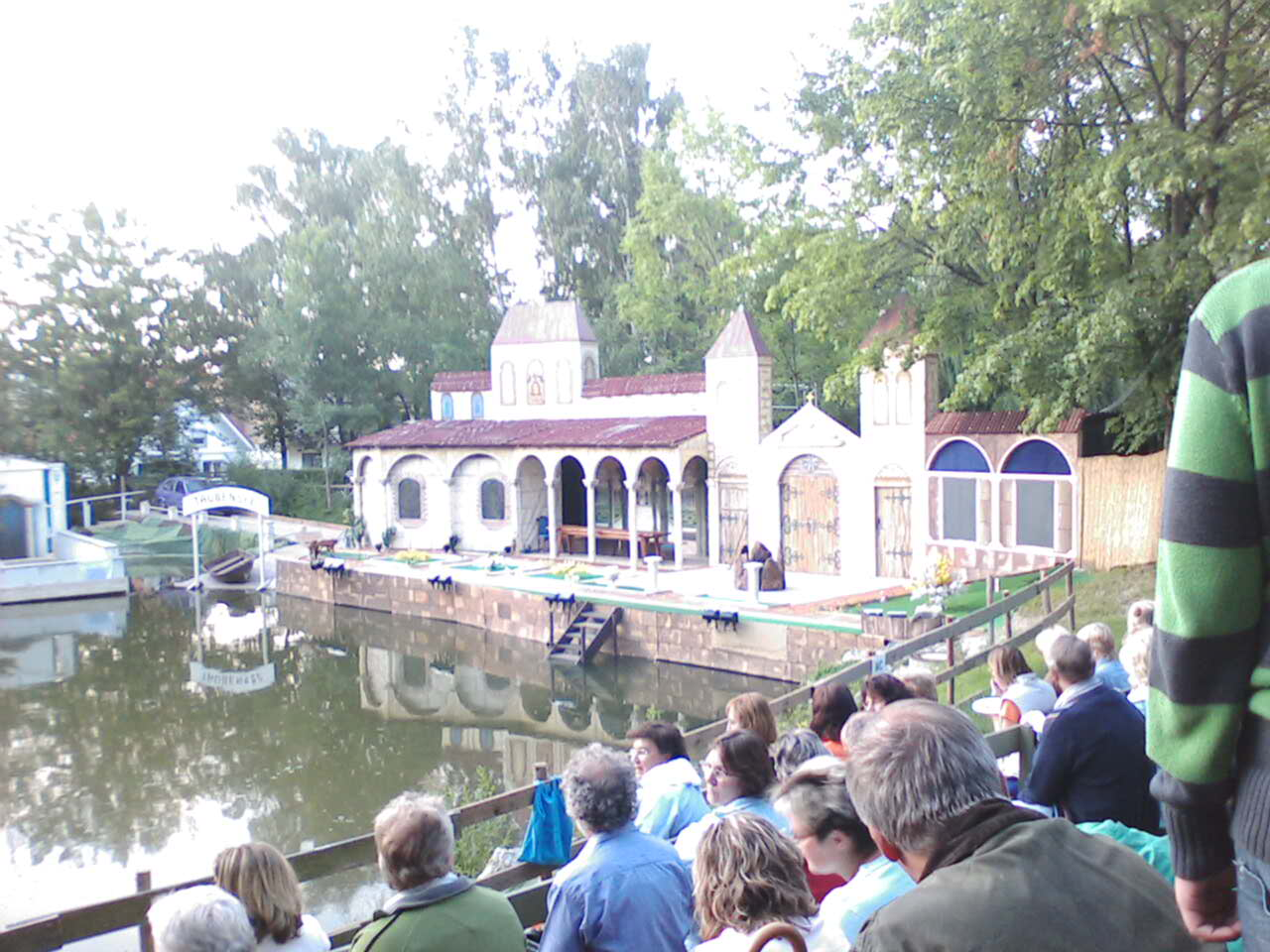
Weiherspiele Markt Schwaben

The Weiherspiele Markt Schwaben ("Markt Schwaben Pond Plays"), an open-air theatre, was founded in 1984 by amateur theatre enthusiasts.

Another very active theatre group is the Junge Bühne Markt Schwaben ("Young Stage"), which has its origins in the Theater im Burgerfeld. It is a theatre group for young people between 15 and 25 founded in 2003.

=== Museum ===
On Bahnhofsstraße is found the Heimatmuseum Markt Schwabens ("Markt Schwaben Local Museum") which houses exhibits from the Stone Age up to the present, and has on hand two scale models of the castle and the later Electoral palace.

=== Buildings ===
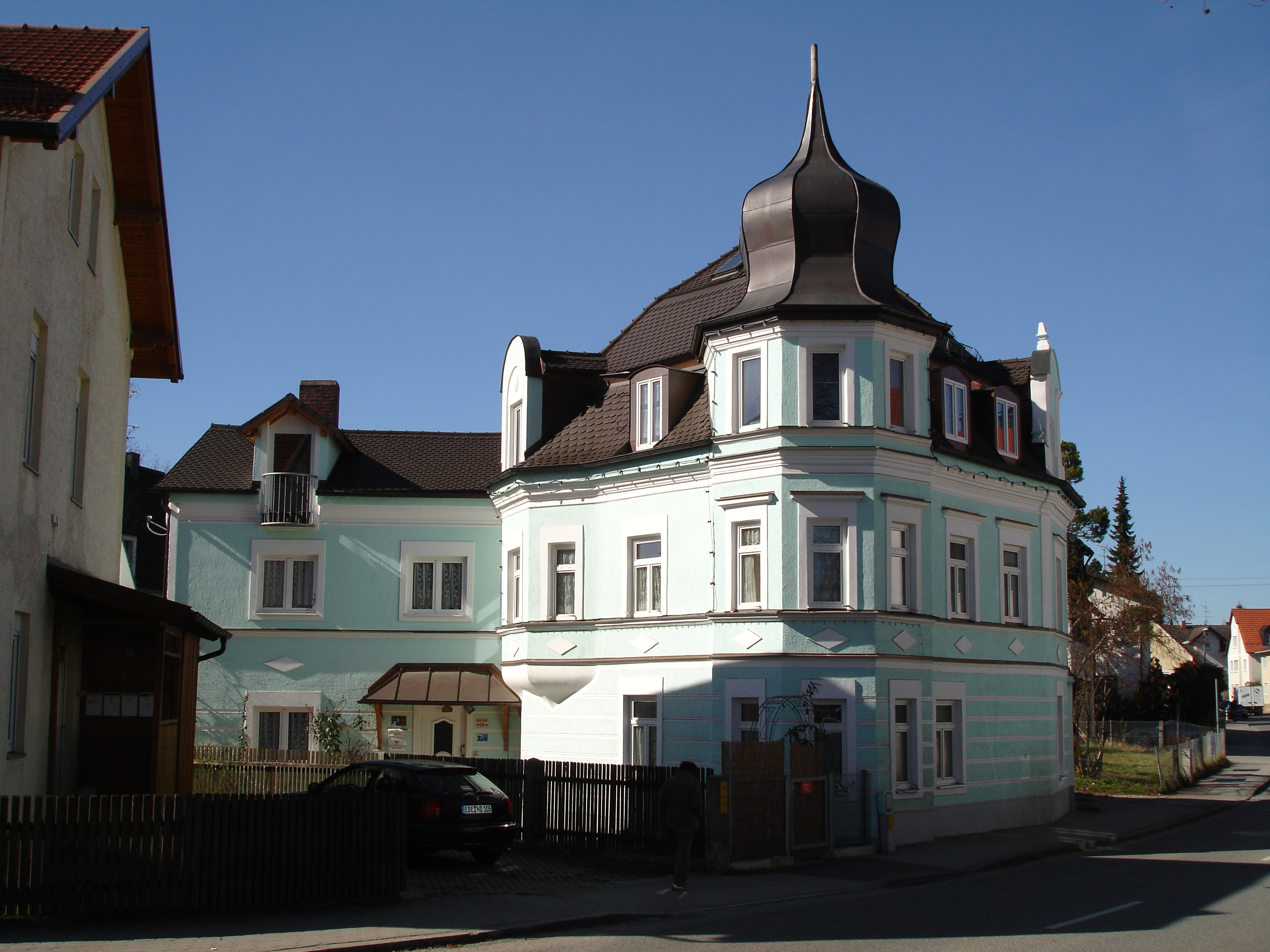
The Pritzl-Haus

Onto the still maintained wing of the old castle has been built the town hall's modern brick building. Rather striking is the old watertower across the street with its merlons, which despite its appearance does not date from the Middle Ages. Also worthy of mention is the Pritzl-Haus with its rare roof construction and tower with cupola. Dating from 1890, it once housed a bakery. Some of the more than 30 rooms are no bigger than a closet. Furthermore, the Haydn-Villa is worth seeing.

The town's oldest building, the Unterbräu, was renovated in 2006. Its history stretches back before the Thirty Years' War. It contains an event hall and space for Markt Schwaben's club life.

The Mariahilf-Kapelle built in 1720 on Gerstlacher Weg now once more, after a lavish renovation that included the grounds, has its old glamour.

=== Regular events ===
Known throughout the district and far beyond are the Schwabener Sonntagsbegegnungen – the Swabian Sunday Meetings. Guests at these dialogues between high-profile personalities, held several times a year since 1994, have included among others Johannes Rau, Joschka Fischer, Rita Süßmuth, Kurt Beck, Gerhard Polt, Alois Glück, Gesine Schwan, former Polish prime minister Tadeusz Mazowiecki, Abbot Primate Notker Wolf and Turkish Family Minister Güldal Aksit. The event is commonly attended by several hundred listeners. The host is Hans-Jochen Vogel.

As well, the Schweiger private brewery has since 1998 set itself the goal of holding a Brauereifest ("Brewery Festival") every other year in late summer over a long weekend, with a traditional-cultural social programme, as an alternative to the folk festival observed yearly since 1994.

== Other ==
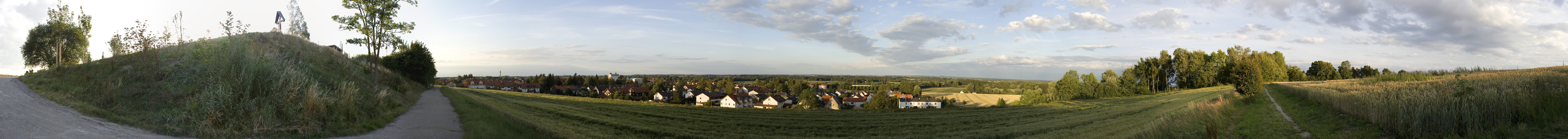
Panorama view

Every year, storks breed in Markt Schwaben on the old schoolhouse's roof next to the Hauptschule on Gerstlacher Weg. The great birds can often be seen standing on roofs, flying over the town or seeking food on the River Hennigbach. The stork has become a symbol for Markt Schwaben. There is a webcam trained on the storks' nest, whereby the brood may be observed over the Internet.

=== Curiosity ===
Supposedly, Markt Schwaben's Catholics have, since the end of building work on St. Margaret's Parish Church, been praying in the "wrong" church, for a local tale has it that architect Georg Zwerger's building plans for the church in Markt Schwaben and the one in Anzing somehow became transposed with each other. A key indication that the story might be true is that the Marienkirche in Anzing had always been foreseen as a pilgrimage church. Such churches as a general rule always have two great portals so that pilgrims may enter through one and leave through the other over on the other side. The church in Markt Schwaben is built like this, but the pilgrimage church in Anzing on the other hand has only one great door.

== Gallery ==
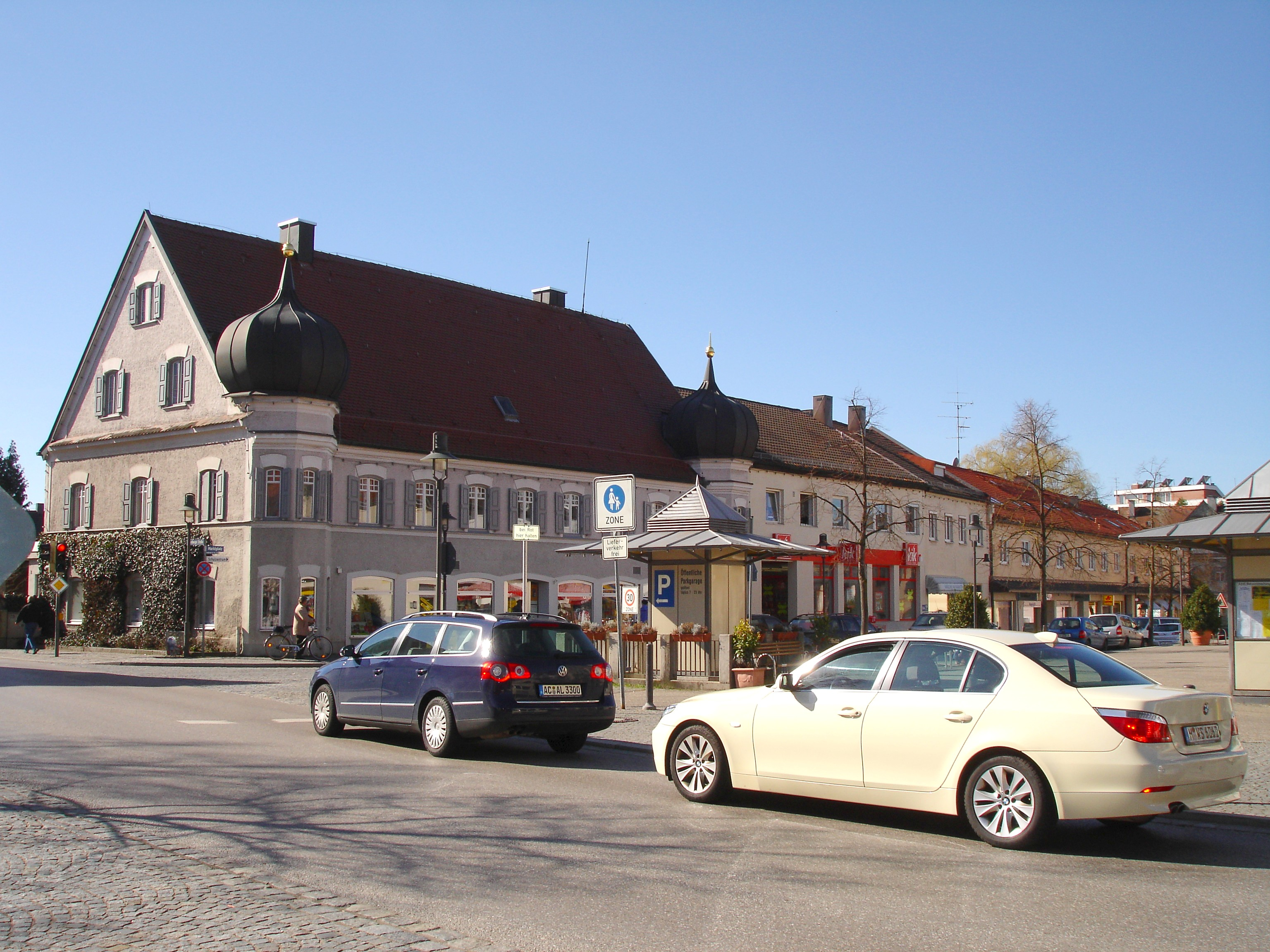
The marketplace (towards the southwest)

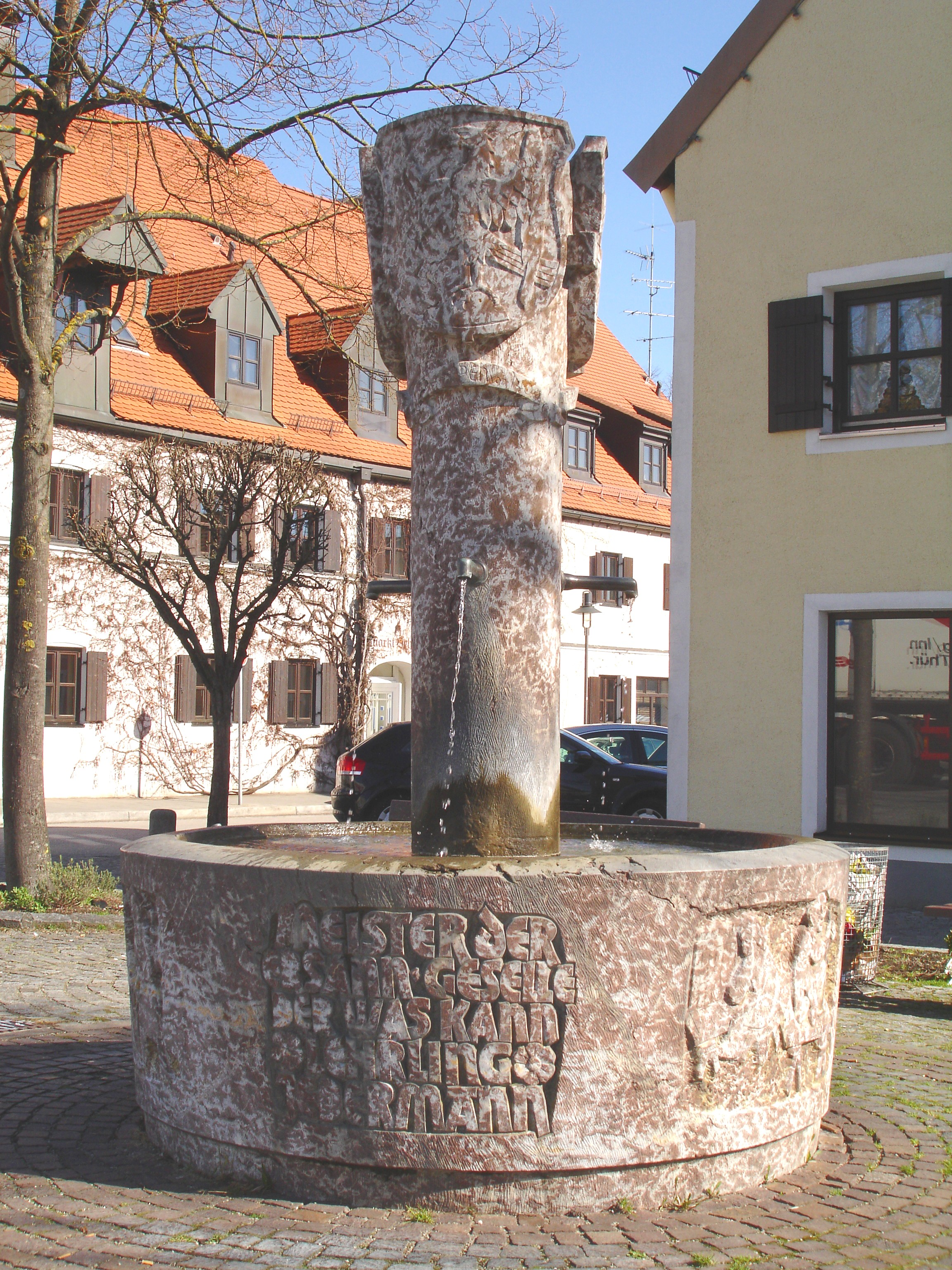
Fountain at the market

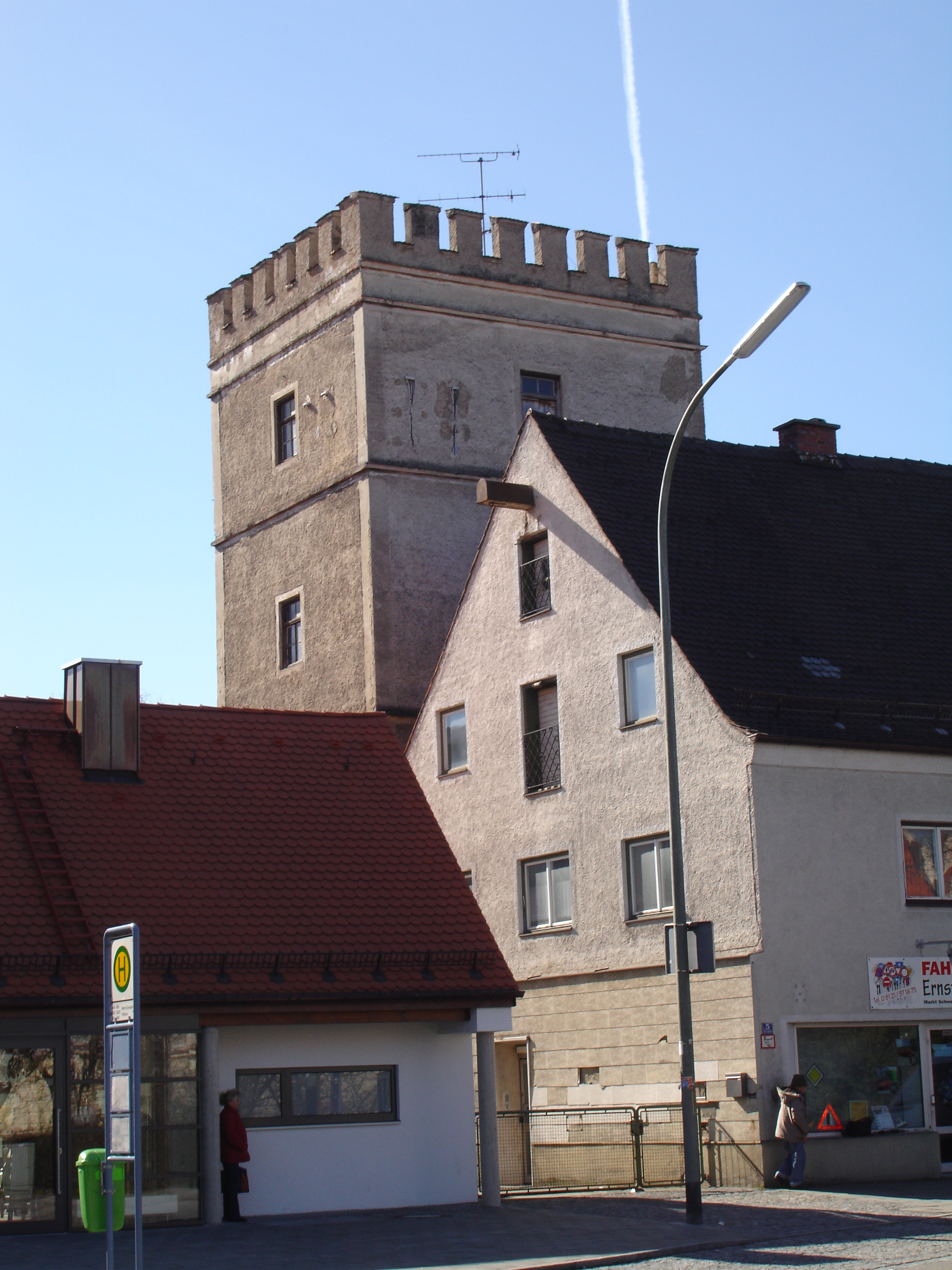
Watertower

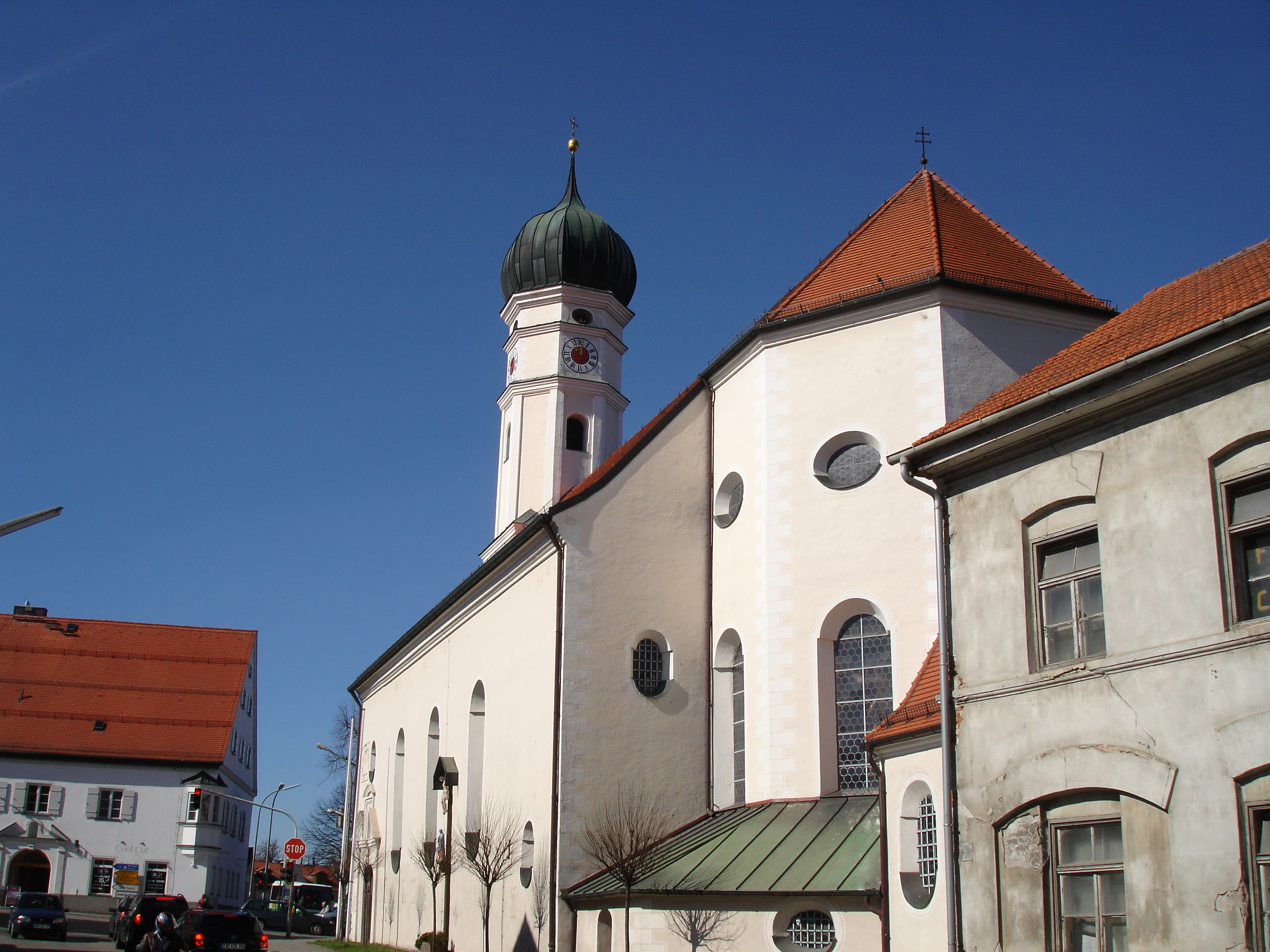
St.Margaret's (Erdinger Straße)

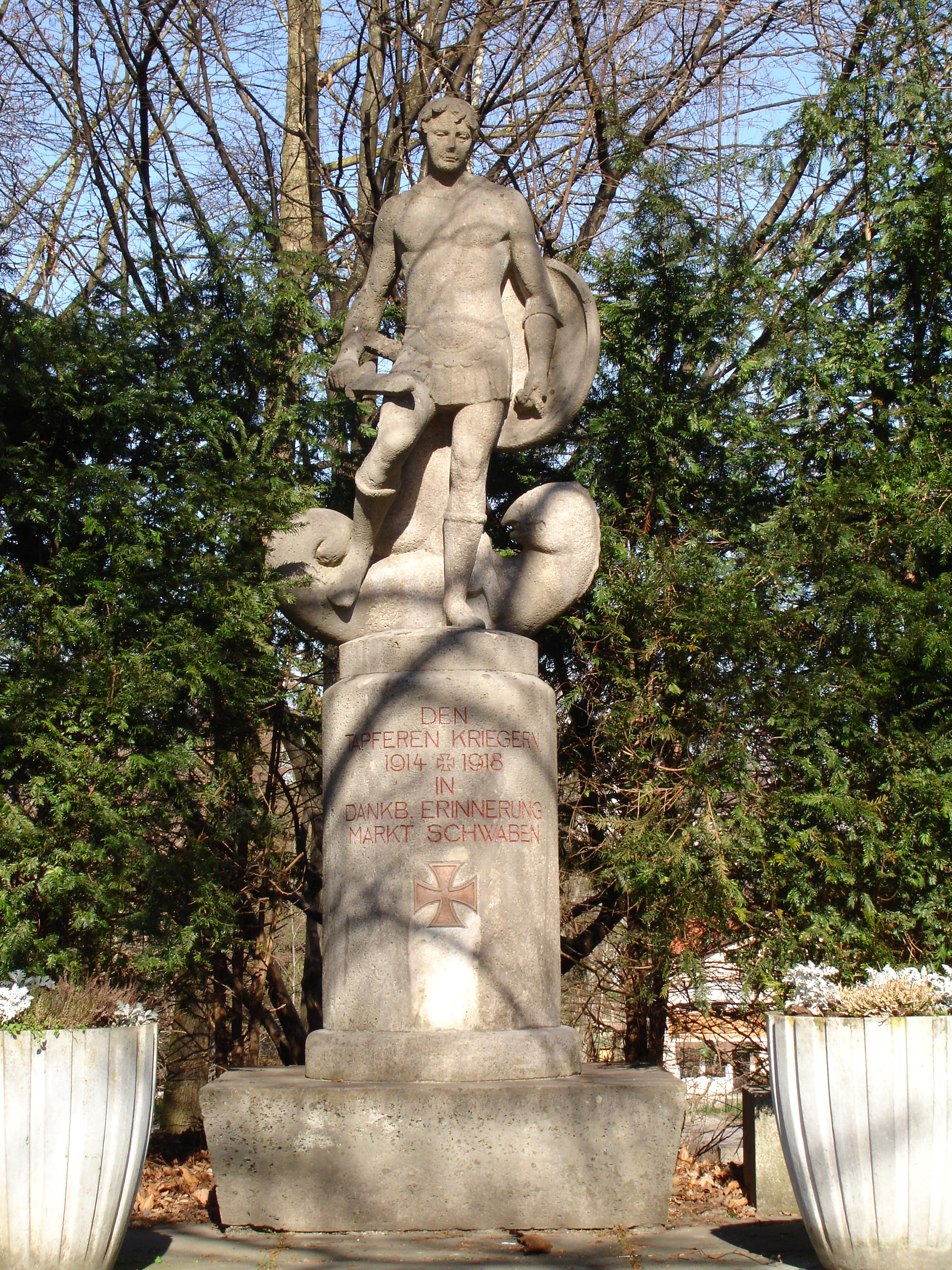
First World War memorial

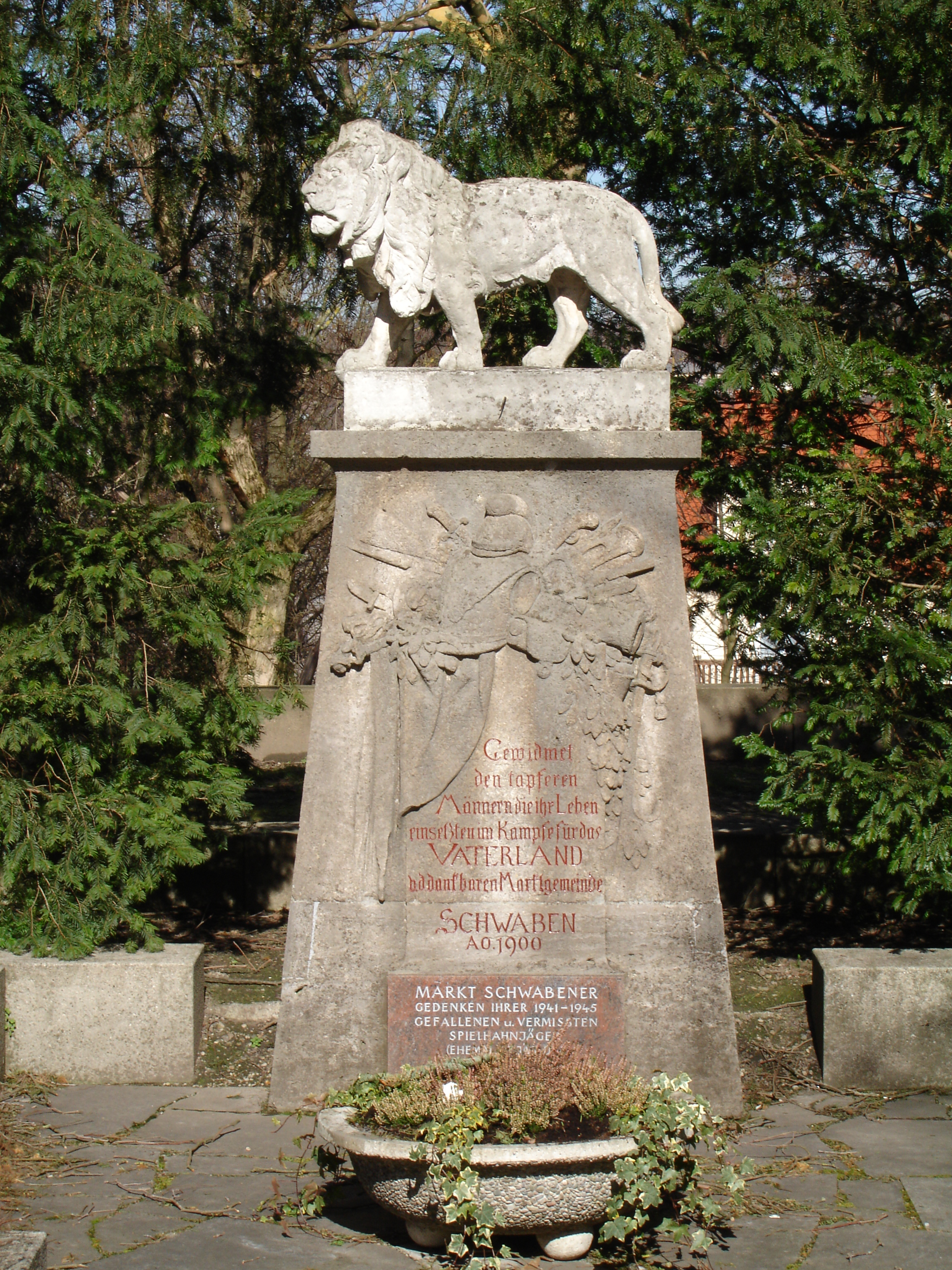
War memorial from 1900 with addition for Second World War

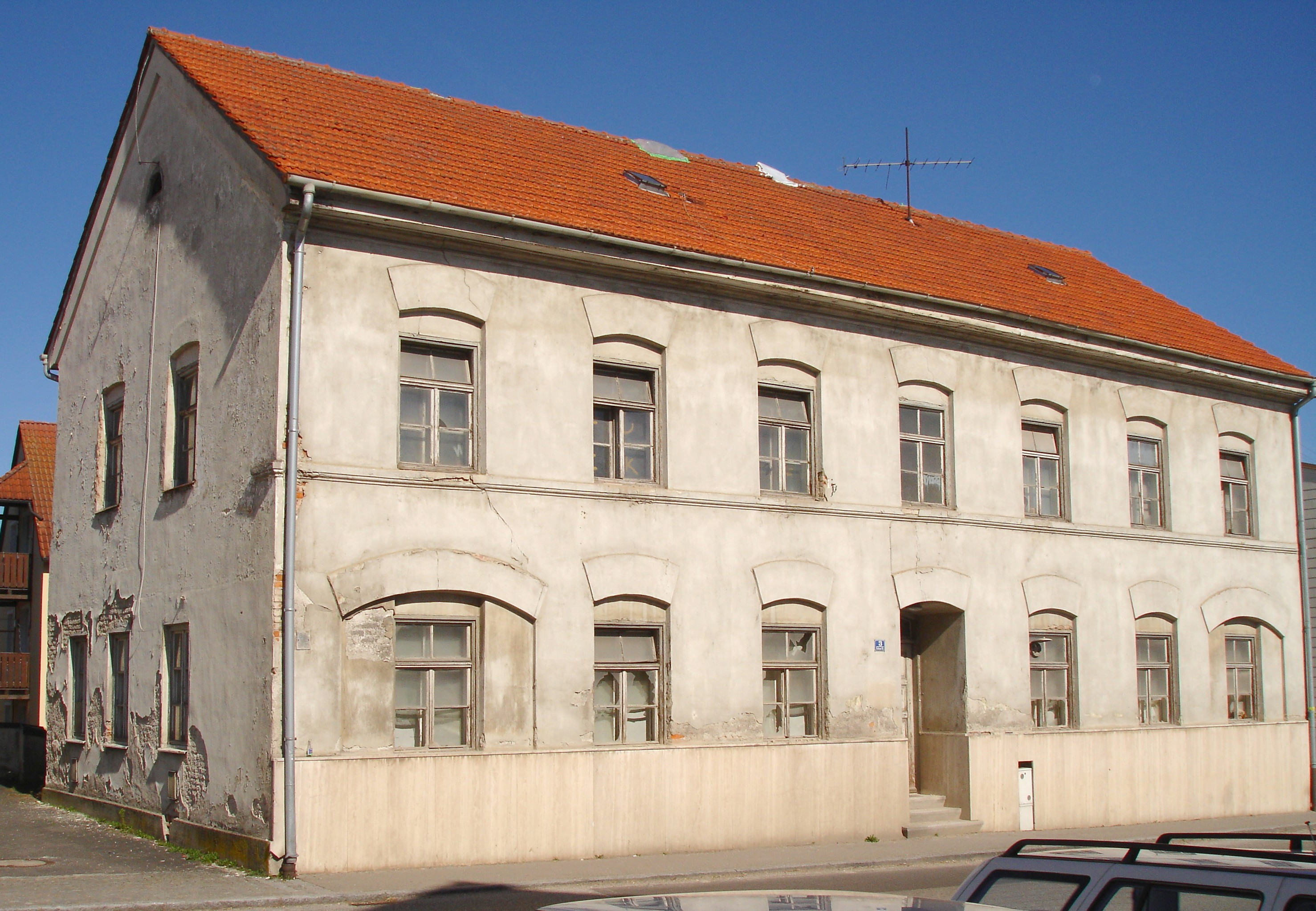
Old schoolhouse, Erdinger Straße

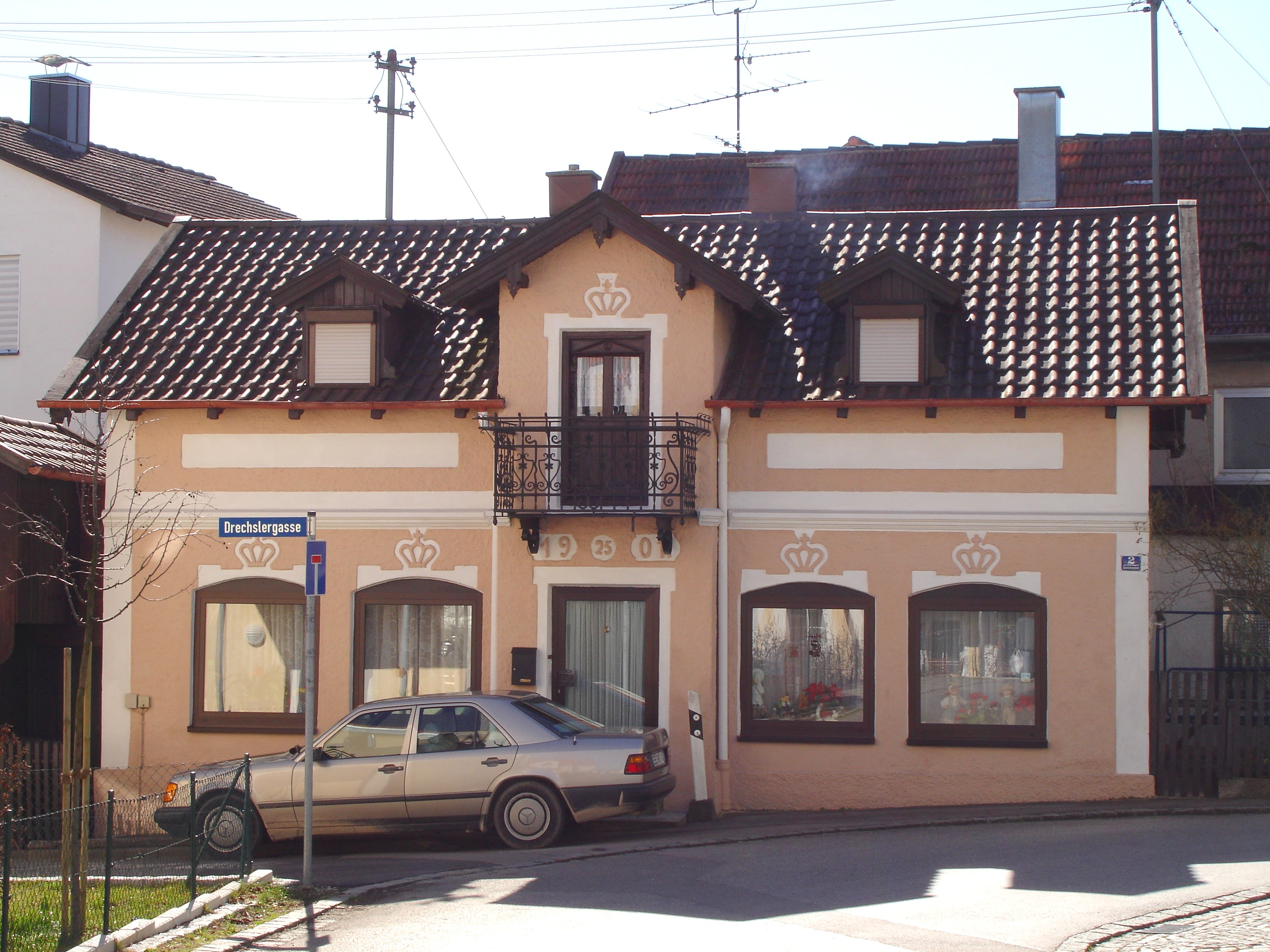
Old house in Drechslergasse.

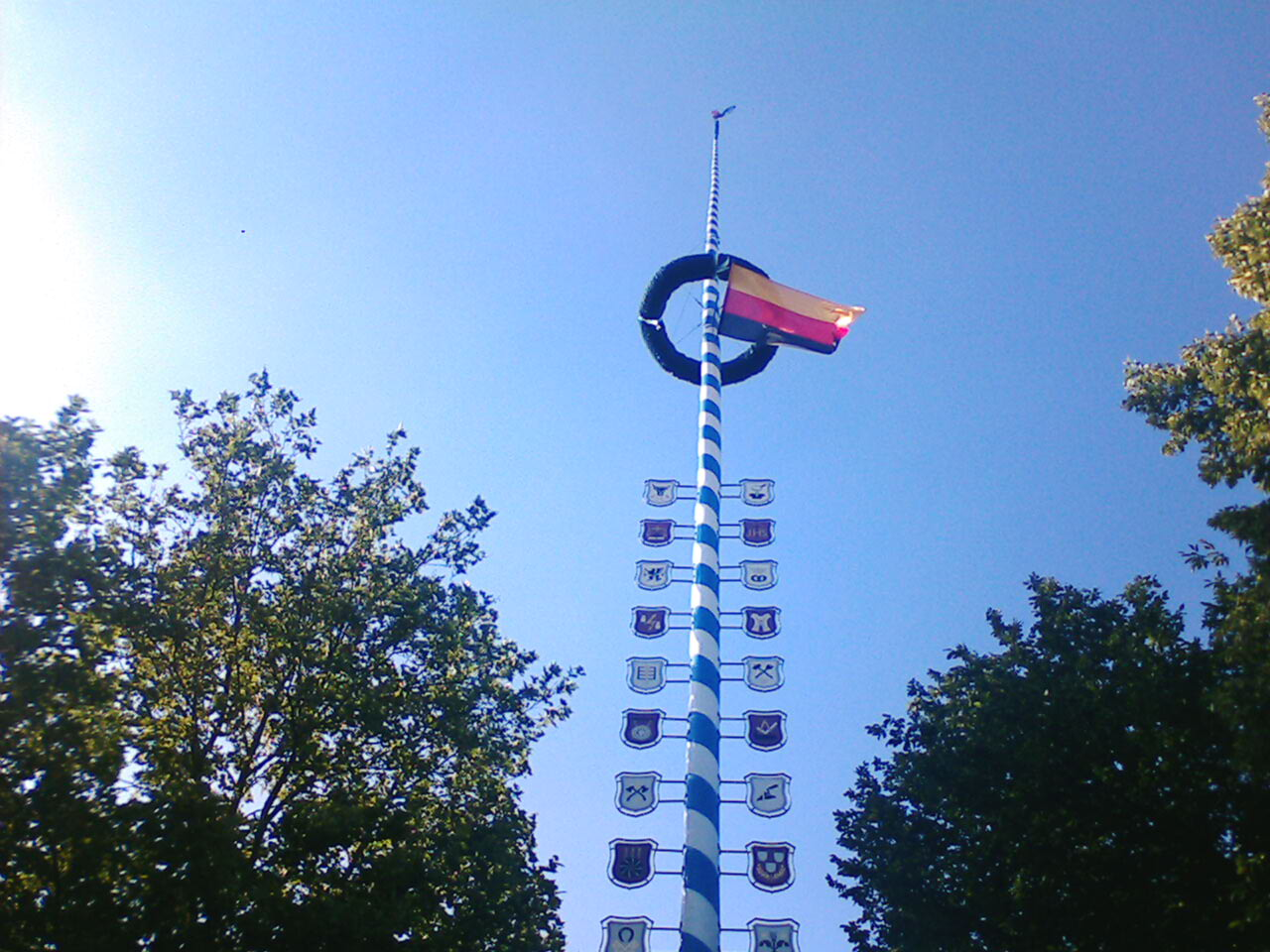
Maibaum with German flag for European football championship final 2006

== Sources ==
- Markt Schwaben's flag at Flags of the world
