= Maibaum =

Maibaum is a German surname meaning "maypole". Notable people with the surname include:

- Richard Maibaum (1909–1991), American film producer, playwright, and screenwriter
- Tom Maibaum, British-Canadian computer scientist

== See also ==
- Heinrich Meibom (disambiguation)
