= Dunasziget =

- Coat of arms

- Location of Győr-Moson-Sopron county in Hungary

- Location of Dunasziget
- Coordinates: 47.93893°N 17.35127°E
- Country: Hungary
- County: Győr-Moson-Sopron

Area
  - Total: 35.89 km^{2} (13.86 sq mi)

Population (2004)
  - Total: 1,477
  - Density: 41.15/km^{2} (106.6/sq mi)
- Time zone: UTC+1 (CET)
  - Summer (DST): UTC+2 (CEST)
- Postal code: 9226
- Area code: 96

Dunasziget is a village in Győr-Moson-Sopron county, Hungary, with 1477 inhabitants. Dunansziget is on the Szigetköz island, which reaches to the Slovak border. The tripoint of Austria, Slovakia and Hungary is 20 km away, and the Austrian capital Vienna is 80 km (50 mi) away.

== History ==
The town of Dunasziget was first mentioned in the 18th century, at that time consisting of three villages named Cikolasziget, Doborgazsziget and Sérfenyősziget. During a flood in 1954, the inhabitants had to be evacuated and most parts of the village have been destroyed and therefore were rebuilt. In 1969, the three villages were combined to form Dunasziget.

== Politics ==
The mayor is Benjamin Csaba Cseh. The sister city is Forstinning in Bavaria, Germany.

== Economy and infrastructure ==
=== Agriculture and tourism ===
The economy in Dunasziget is characterized by small farms, but also several businesses in the field of tourism such as guest houses, boat rentals and campgrounds. The floodplain forest of the Danube river, which surrounds the village, offers various recreational activities like canoeing, fishing and observing the wildlife.

=== Education ===
In Dunasziget are a kindergarten and an elementary school. The Timaffy-Endre elementary school was founded in the 19th century and nowadays has eight classes with 66 students total.

== Culture and sights ==
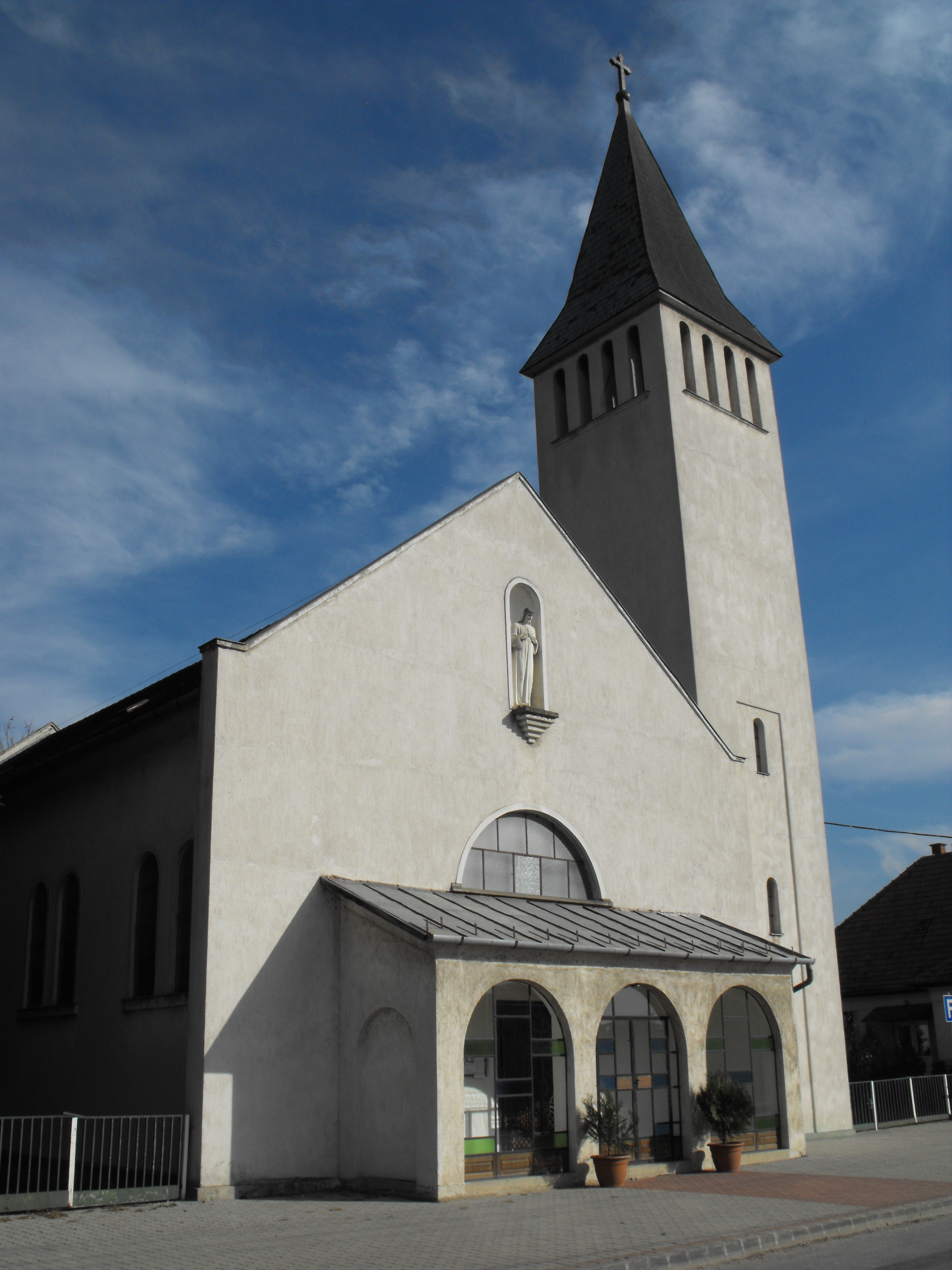
Church Dunasziget

- Roman Catholic Church of Sacred Heart of Jesus
- Millenium Memorial
- Bathing beach
- Floodplain Forests
