= Obelfing =

Obelfing Obelfing
- Ortsteil of Anzing
- Interactive map of Obelfing
- Location within Germany Location within Bavaria
- Coordinates: 48.14404°N 11.86258°E
- Country: Germany
- State: Bavaria
- District: Ebersberg
- Municipality: Anzing
- Time zone: UTC+01:00 (CET)
  - Summer (DST): UTC+02:00 (CEST)

Obelfing is a district of the municipality of Anzing in the Upper Bavarian district of Ebersberg.

== Location ==
The village of Obelfing is located about half a kilometre southeast of Anzing. The settlements border each other. South of Obelfing begins the Anzing Forest, part of the Ebersberg Forest.
