= Alois Hundhammer =

German politician

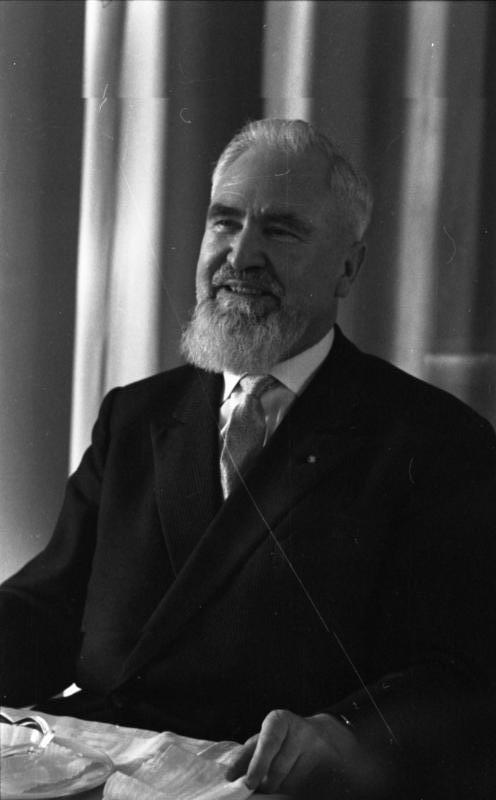
- Alois Hundhammer (1963)

Parliamentary group leader of the CSU
- In office 1946–1951

Personal details
- Born: 25 February 1900 Moos, Bavaria, Germany
- Died: 1 August 1974 (aged 74) Munich, Bavaria, West Germany

Alois Hundhammer (25 February 1900, Moos – 1 August 1974, Munich) was one of the most prominent politicians in Bavaria after World War II.

== Early life ==
Alois Hundhammer, the first of thirteen children, was born to Alois and Maria (Grill) Hundhammer on 25 February 1900 on his parents’ farm in Moos. His upbringing was heavily shaped by the country lifestyle and his parents' Catholic religion. He attended the monastic school Scheyern Abbey and, despite his father's initial protest, the humanistic Dom-Gymnasium in Freising.

Hundhammer's studies were interrupted in the summer of 1918 by World War I, in which he served briefly on the Western Front before enlisting in the Freikorps and taking part in the battle for Munich against the Bavarian Soviet Republic in April 1919. After the conclusion of fighting, he was able to begin studying history, philosophy, and economy at the Ludwig-Maximilians-Universität München in the winter semester of 1919/1920. He married Adelheid Hillenbrand in 1923.

Hundhammer received his doctorate in 1923 with a thesis entitled "Die Geschichte des Bayerischen Bauernbundes" ("The History of the Bavarian Farmers' League). He completed a second doctorate three years later with a work on "the agricultural trade association of Bavaria." In 1927, he became general secretary of the Upper Bavarian Christian Farmers Union. Hundhammer became the youngest representative in the Bavarian Landtag after being elected in the state elections of 1932.

As a politician in the Weimar Republic, Hundhammer became known as a campaigner for farmer's rights. One of the results of his campaigning on behalf of the farming class was the published work Staatsbürgerliche Vorträge (Civic Lectures) in which he strongly rejected the tenets of National Socialism from a thoroughly Catholic viewpoint, labeling it the "new Germanic Hedonism."

== Nazi-era ==
Staatsbürgerliche Vorträge was banned by the Nazis in 1933, the same year in which Hundhammer along with fellow Bavarian People's Party (BVP) members were arrested by the Bavarian Political Police (later: Gestapo). After being arrested on 21 June 1933, Hundhammer was placed in the newly opened Dachau concentration camp on 29 June. He was released on 22 July of the same year.

After his release Hundhammer entered a shattered professional and economical existence. His assets and attempts to find qualified work were both blocked by the Nazis, so he acquired a shoe-repair workshop in the fall of 1933 with the help of Father Rupert Mayer in order to continue providing for his growing family. This workshop became a point of contact for former members of the BVP as well as current members of the Munich Catholic circle before being closed by the Gestapo in November 1937.

Hundhammer avoided confrontation with the Nazis throughout the remainder of the Nazi-Era out of consideration for his family, which consisted of his wife and four sons by 1941. He was drafted into and served in the Wehrmacht from 1939 until 1944.

== Postwar ==
Hundhammer met and developed relationships with numerous politically interested prisoners while in American captivity at the end of the war. After being released in 1945, he worked with Karl Scharnagl, Josef Müller, and Fritz Schäffer to establish the Christian Social Union of Bavaria (CSU). As a result of his strong reputation as an opponent of the Nazis, Hundhammer experienced considerable success in building political strength. He played a crucial role in the writing of the Bavarian Constitution and was directly responsible for writing the preamble.

- Preamble to the Constitution of the Free State of Bavaria:

"Angesichts des Trümmerfeldes, zu dem eine Staats- und Gesellschaftsordnung ohne Gott, ohne Gewissen und ohne Achtung vor der Würde des Menschen die Überlebenden des zweiten Weltkrieges geführt hat, in dem festen Entschlusse, den kommenden deutschen Geschlechtern die Segnungen des Friedens, der Menschlichkeit und des Rechtes dauernd zu sichern, gibt sich das Bayerische Volk, eingedenk seiner mehr als tausendjährigen Geschichte, nachstehende demokratische Verfassung."

"Mindful of the physical devastation which the survivors of the Second World War were led into by a godless state and social order lacking in all conscience a respect for human dignity, firmly intending moreover to secure permanently for future German generations the blessing of peace, humanity, and law, and looking back over a thousand years and more of history, the Bavarian people hereby bestows upon itself the following democratic constitution."

Hundhammer was elected parliamentary group leader of the CSU in 1946 and remained in power until 1951. He also served as Staatsminister of Education and Culture. From 1951 until 1954 he was president of the Landtag of Bavaria.

In the years after the war, Hundhammer also remained particularly active in various Catholic associations. He founded the Katholischer Männerverein Tuntenhausen in 1945, remained active in the Catholic student groups he had joined during his time at the university, and became a member of the Order of the Holy Sepulchre in 1957.

Hundhammer died in Munich on 1 August 1974.
