= Heinrich Meibom =

Heinrich Meibom may refer to:

- Heinrich Meibom (poet) (1555–1625), German historian and poet
- Heinrich Meibom (doctor) (1638–1700), his grandson, German physician and scholar
