= Anzing =

- Municipality
- Coat of arms

- Location of Anzing within Ebersberg district
- Interactive map of Anzing
- Location within Germany Location within Bavaria
- Coordinates: 48°09′N 11°51′E
- Country: Germany
- State: Bavaria
- Admin. region: Oberbayern
- District: Ebersberg

Government
  - Mayor (2020–26): Kathrin Alte (CSU)

Area
  - Total: 16.18 km^{2} (6.25 sq mi)
- Elevation: 518.82 m (1,702.2 ft)

Population (2025-12-31)
  - Total: 4,433
  - Density: 274.0/km^{2} (709.6/sq mi)
- Time zone: UTC+01:00 (CET)
  - Summer (DST): UTC+02:00 (CEST)
- Postal codes: 85646
- Dialling codes: 08121
- Vehicle registration: EBE
- Website: www.anzing.de

Anzing (German pronunciation: [ˈantsɪŋ]) is a municipality in the Upper Bavarian district of Ebersberg.

== Geography ==
=== Municipal divisions ===
Constituent communities include Anzing, Auhofen, Boden, Froschkern, Frotzhofen, Garkofen, Hl. Kreuz, Höggerloh, Kaisersberg, Köppelmühle, Lindach, Mauerstetten, Obelfing, Oberasbach, Ranharting, Ried, Staudach, Unterasbach and Ziegelstadel.

== History ==
In 812, the community had its first documentary mention “in loco anzinga”. It belonged to the Rentamt of Munich/Court District of Swabia. Under administrative reforms in Bavaria in 1818, Anzing became an autonomous community.

== Politics ==
=== Municipal council ===
The current council consists of 16 councillors from 6 groupings:

- 6 councillors, including the First Mayor, are from the CSU,
- 3 councillors are from the SPD,
- 3 councillors are from the UBA (Unabhängige Bürgergemeinschaft Anzing, Independent Citizens‘ Community),
- 2 councillors are from the AJA (Aktive Jugend Anzing),
- 1 councillor each comes from the Greens and the FWG (Freie Wählergemeinschaft Anzing, Anzing Free Voters’ Community)

=== Mayors ===
- First Mayor: Richard Hollerith (CSU)
- Second Mayor: Franz Finauer (UBA)
- Third Mayor: Peter Moossmann (CSU)

=== Coat of arms ===
Anzing’s coat of arms might be described thus: In Or a lion rampant sable armed and langued gules, above which two crossed lily staffs (Lilienstäbe in German) azure.

== Economy and infrastructure ==
=== Transport ===
Anzing has an interchange with Bundesautobahn 94, which will lead from Munich through Mühldorf am Inn to Passau, although as yet (May 2007) it is only partly finished. Anzing lies only about 22 km east of the state capital, Munich, 18 km south of Erding, 34 km from Munich airport and 14 km from Ebersberg.

== Businesses established in town ==
- Lidl Auslieferungslager
- Auto König (Exklusiv Fahrzeug Händler)
- MasterTent Deutschland
- Industrielle Buchbinderei Bückers GmbH

and many other regional businesses.

== Famous people ==
Sepp Maier, FC Bayern goalkeeper and for many years federal goalkeeping trainer is known as the Katze von Anzing – the Cat from Anzing.

Gsindl, Bavarian rock band.
