= D35 motorway (Czech Republic) =

Motorway in the Czech Republic

D35 Motorway
- Dálnice D35

Route information
- Part of E442 E462
- Length: 89 km (55 mi) Planned: 205 km (127 mi)

Major junctions
- From: Úlibice
- D55 near Olomouc (planned); D46 near Olomouc; D43 (planned); D11 near Hradec Králové; D10 near Turnov (planned)
- To: D1 at Lipník nad Bečvou

Location
- Country: Czech Republic
- Regions: Olomouc, Pardubice, Hradec Králové, Liberec
- Major cities: Olomouc, Hradec Králové, Liberec

Highway system
- Highways in the Czech Republic
| ← D11 | → D43 |

D35 motorway (Czech: Dálnice D35), formerly Expressway R35 (Czech: Rychlostní silnice R35) is a motorway in the Czech Republic. Once completed, it will be the second longest highway in Czech Republic, running from Úlibice to the D1 at Lipník nad Bečvou. The motorway is part of the European route E442. Around Hradec Králové, the D35 runs in parallel with the D11 (between the Sedlice interchange and the Plotiště interchange).

After completion (planned for 2028), it will become an alternative route to motorway D1 between Prague and Olomouc and Ostrava. The first segment was opened in the 1970s. As of 2023, 89 km of full motorway are in operation in three segments.

== Chronology ==
Originally, the D35 motorway from Hradec Králové to Lipník nad Bečvou was planned. However, in 1987, it was decided to build the R35 expressway instead of the motorway and to extend its route to Liberec. The rest of the R35 expressway is classified as a Class I road for motor vehicles.

Currently, the section of the D35 motorway Mohelnice - Olomouc - Lipník nad Bečvou is in operation. A section of the former R35 Liberec - Turnov expressway is also in operation, but it has not been classified as a motorway and since 1 January 2016 has been an I/35 road.

On 27 November 2009, the section Sedlice - Opatovice nad Labem was put into operation with a length of approximately 3.5 km. The three-storey Opatovice interchange is one of the largest intersections in the Czech Republic. The last of the interchange sections around Hradec Králové were completed in December 2021.

On 15 December 2021, the Opatovice nad Labem - Časy section of the motorway was put into operation. This, together with the opening of other sections of the D11 motorway, enabled the transfer of transit from Svitavy in the direction of Prague, Jičín and Jaroměř outside Hradec Králové. The connecting section to Ostrov was opened a year later, in December 2022.

In Olomouc, a 3.1 kilometres (1.9 mi) realignment called the Northern Connection bridged the gap between the Lipník nad Bečvou - Olomouc section, connecting with the D35 section between Olomouc and Mohelnice, grade separating traffic to Olomouc. This link was opened to traffic on 20 November 2025. This section removed the break near Křelov near Olomouc.

=== Future development ===
ŘSD envisions several sections of the D35 to continue into the direction of Liberec. A 10.45 kilometres (6.49 mi) long section between is under construction since November 2023, and is set to be opened in 2025. More sections are in planning.

The motorway also has several lengthy sections in construction and in planning between Hradec Králové and Olomouc. A 7 kilometres (4.3 mi) long section between Ostrov - Vysoké Mýto is in construction, and is planned to be open for operation for 2026. Also in construction and planned for opening with the section, is the very short 0.5 kilometres (0.31 mi) Homole tunnel under a 307 metre hill.

Other sections on that stretch in construction include Vysoké Mýto - Džbánov, a 5.95 kilometres (3.70 mi) long section, in construction since November 2023 and planned for a 2025 opening; Džbánov - Litomyšl, a 8 kilometres (5.0 mi) long section, where Budimex began construction in April 2024, and the opening is planned for 2027, with the section Janov - Opatovec planned for a December 2025 opening.

== Images ==
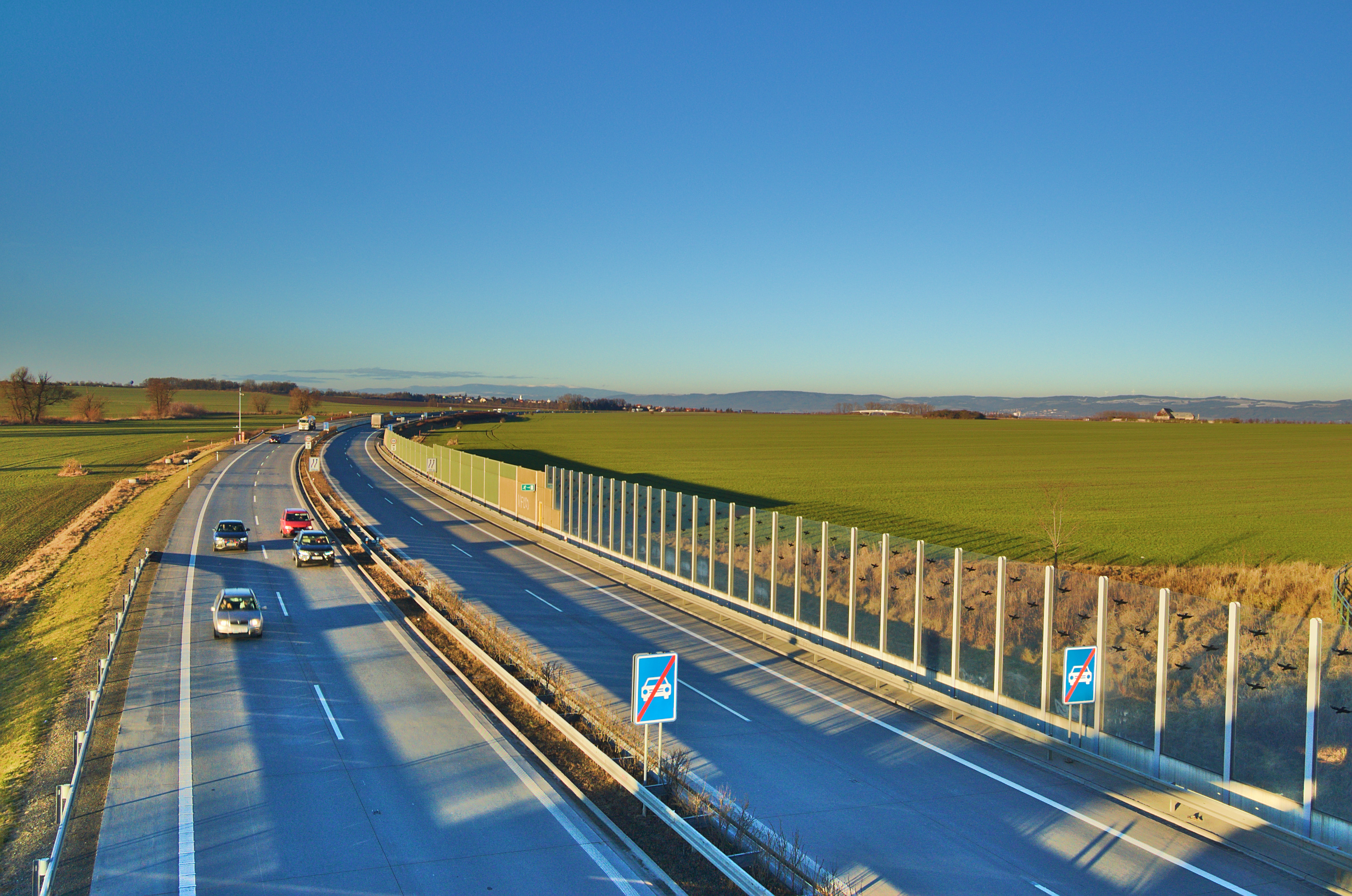
Highway D35 near Olomouc.

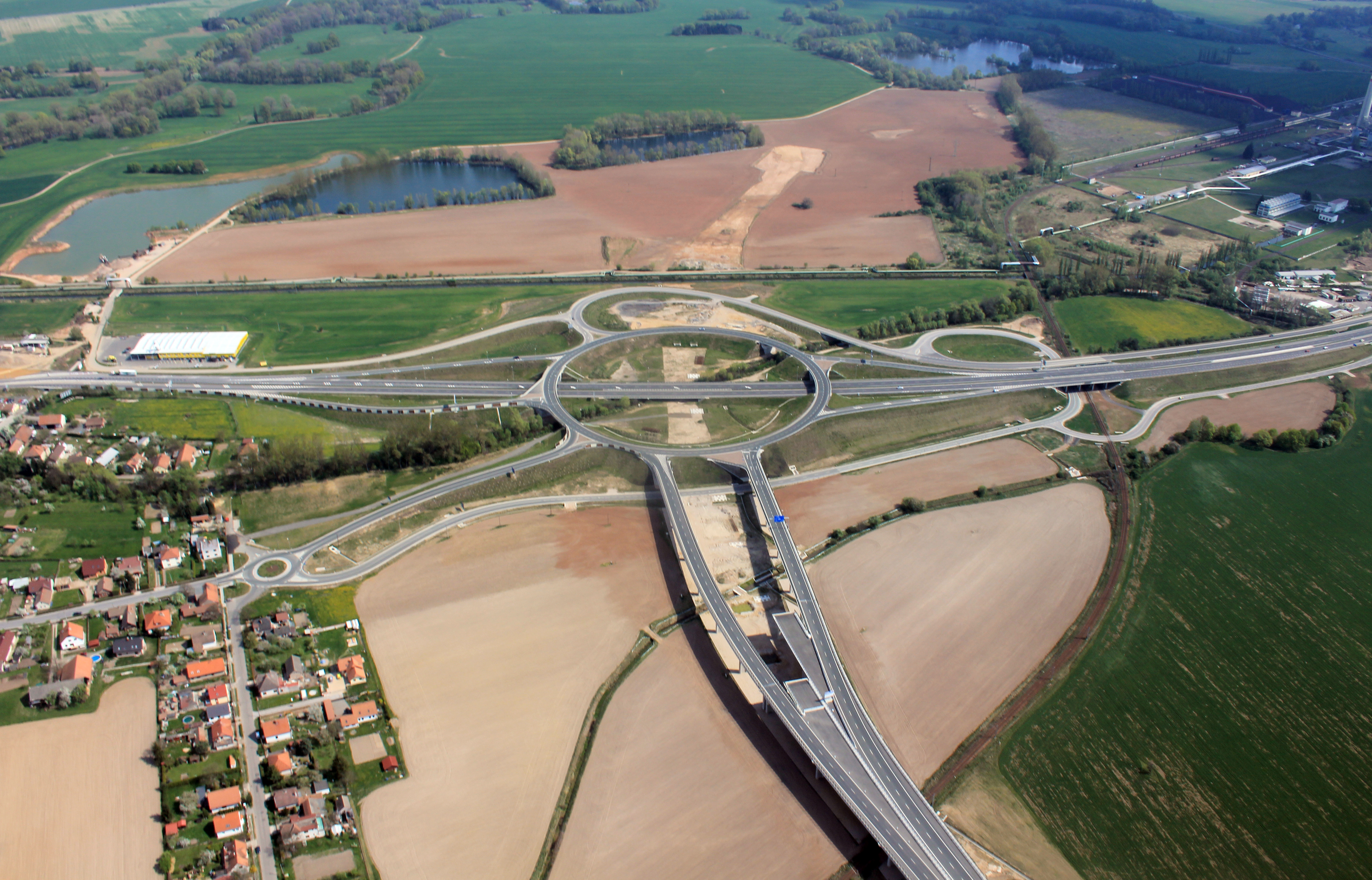
D35 near Opatovice nad Labem

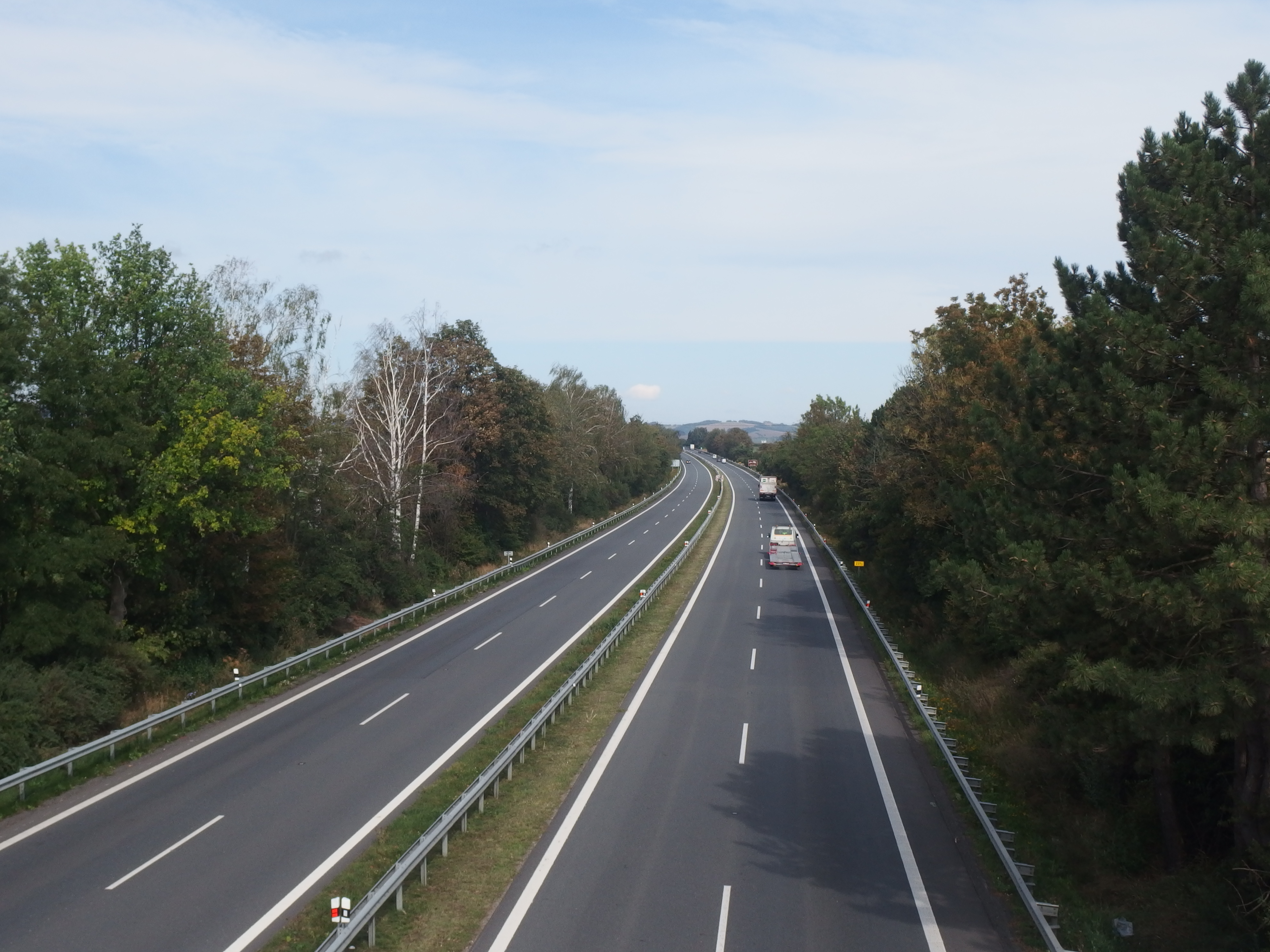
D35 in Loštice
