= Highways in the Czech Republic =

Highways in the Czech Republic are managed by the state-owned Directorate of Highways and Motorways of the Czech Republic – ŘSD ČR. As of January 2026, ŘSD manages 1,556 km of motorways (dálnice) and 5,700 km of highways (silnice). The national speed limit is 130 km/h on motorways and 90 km/h on highways.

== Road categories ==
There are 2 main categories of state-owned roads in Czech Republic: motorways (dálnice) and highways (silnice).

=== Motorways (Dálnice) ===
Motorway sign, dálnice

Motorway number road sign

This is the highest category of roads in the Czech Republic, forming the trunk of the road network. Their start and end are marked by white-on-green directional motorway signs and the informational signs on them and leading to them are green. They are designated by a number prefixed by the letter D and their road numbers are displayed on red rectangular shields. They are maintained by the state and the use of most of their sections is paid via electronic vignettes or toll, though bypasses of large towns and other sections that are used for local traffic tend to be exempt. An electronic vignette is compulsory unless stated otherwise. The national speed limit on motorways is 130 km/h outside urban areas and 80 km/h within urban areas. Similarly to other European countries they include at least 2 lanes in each direction, as well as an emergency lane on the right and auxiliary lanes for entering and leaving the motorway in intersections.

=== Highways (Silnice) ===
First class road number sign

This category contains all remaining state-owned roads. The highway network is divided into three classes, which are distinguished by the number of digits in the highway number. First and second class roads have blue rectangular signs placed on them and their road numbers displayed on a blue background. The class number can be optionally stated in roman numerals in front of the road number, separated by a slash. No electronic vignette is needed on highways, only truck electronic toll is on selected highway sections. The national speed limit on highways is 90 km/h, reduced to 50 km/h in urban areas, with dual carriageways having the same 90 km/h national speed limit unless stated otherwise.

First class roads (silnice I. třídy) are designated by an up to two-digit number and are owned by the state.

Second class roads (silnice II. třídy) are designated by a three-digit number and are owned by the regions. The first digit identifies the general location of the route:

- 1xx - south Bohemia
- 2xx - north Bohemia
- 3xx - east Bohemia, Vysočina
- 4xx - Moravia and Silesia
- 6xx - former first class roads replaced by a motorway

Third class roads (silnice III. třídy) are also owned by the regions. These are designated by four to five-digit numbers, where the first three digits are the number of a nearby higher class road, padded by zeroes if less than three digits. The road numbers are not marked on most maps and road signs.

==== Highways for motorcars (Silnice pro motorová vozidla) ====
Highway for motorcars sign (Silnice pro motorová vozidla)

Some sections of highways have their start and end marked by blue highway for motorcars signs. These highways are off-limits for non-motorised traffic. The national speed limit is 110 km/h, reduced to 80 km/h in urban areas. As they form parts of existing highways and are not a road system on their own, they do not have any specific numbering system. Thus blue informational road signs and road numbers on blue background are used outside built-up areas and white informational road signs within built-up areas.

=== Other roads ===
==== Local roads ====
Local roads (místní komunikace) are public roads that serve local traffic and are not already part of a highway or a motorway. They are owned and maintained by municipalities. Similarly to highways, they are divided into four classes according to their importance, where the first class includes the most important collector roads in cities, while the fourth class includes walk paths and bike roads that are off-limits to automobiles. The Road Act also allows for so-called "express local roads" to be built up to expressway standards to accommodate for fast motor traffic.

A first class local road can be signed as a Road for motorcars (Silnice pro motorová vozidla) if there are no intersections with other roads, auxiliary lanes are used for entering and exiting the road and access to adjacent buildings is forbidden. Local roads use black-on-white signs.

==== Access roads ====
Access road (účelová komunikace) can be owned by any subject, private as well as public.

== Network map ==
Interactive map of motorways in the Czech Republic

== Toll requirements ==
Motorways in the Czech Republic: completed under construction planned

Current plans for a motorway network in the Czech Republic

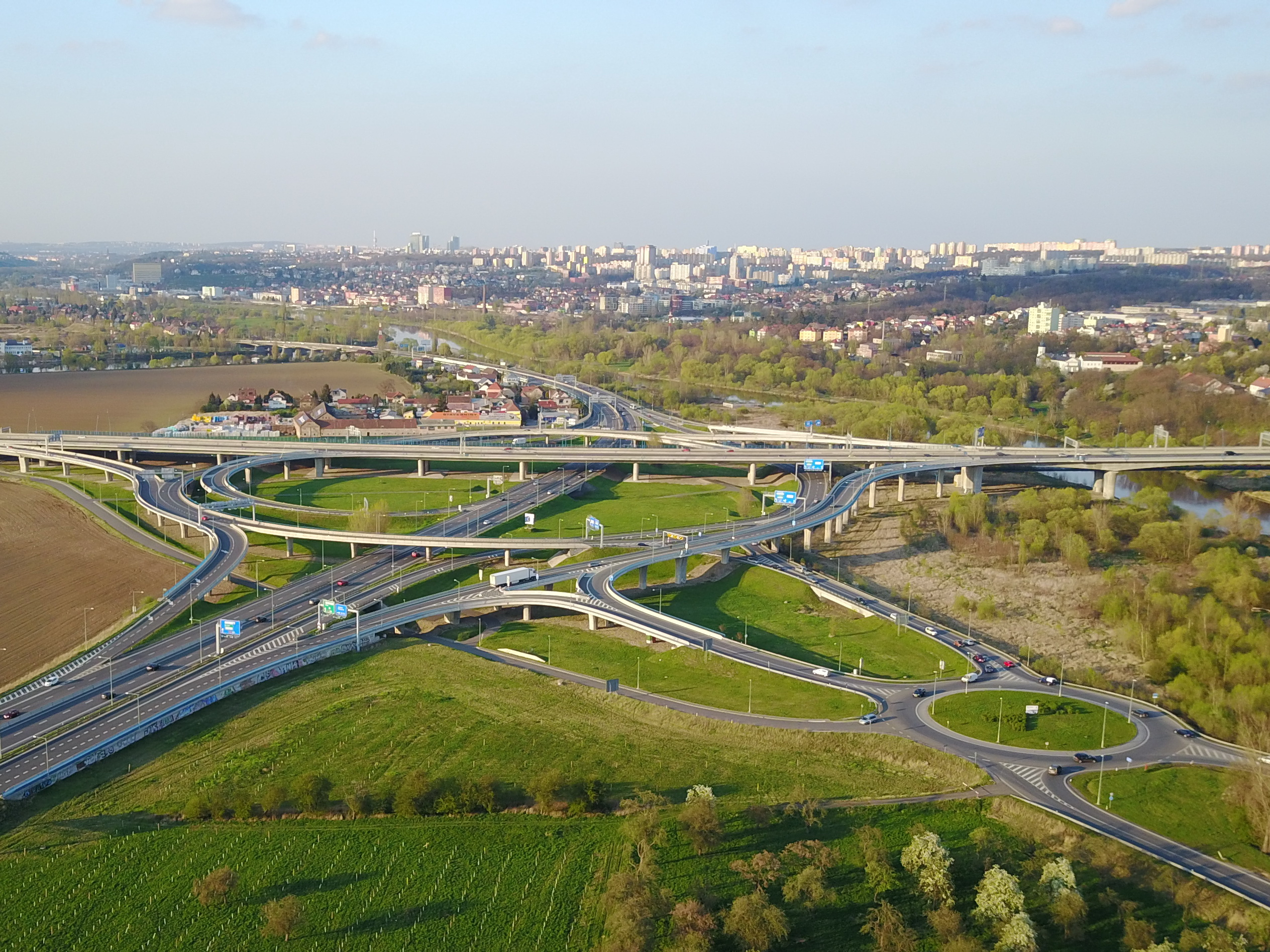
The largest junction in Lahovice near Prague, D0 motorway

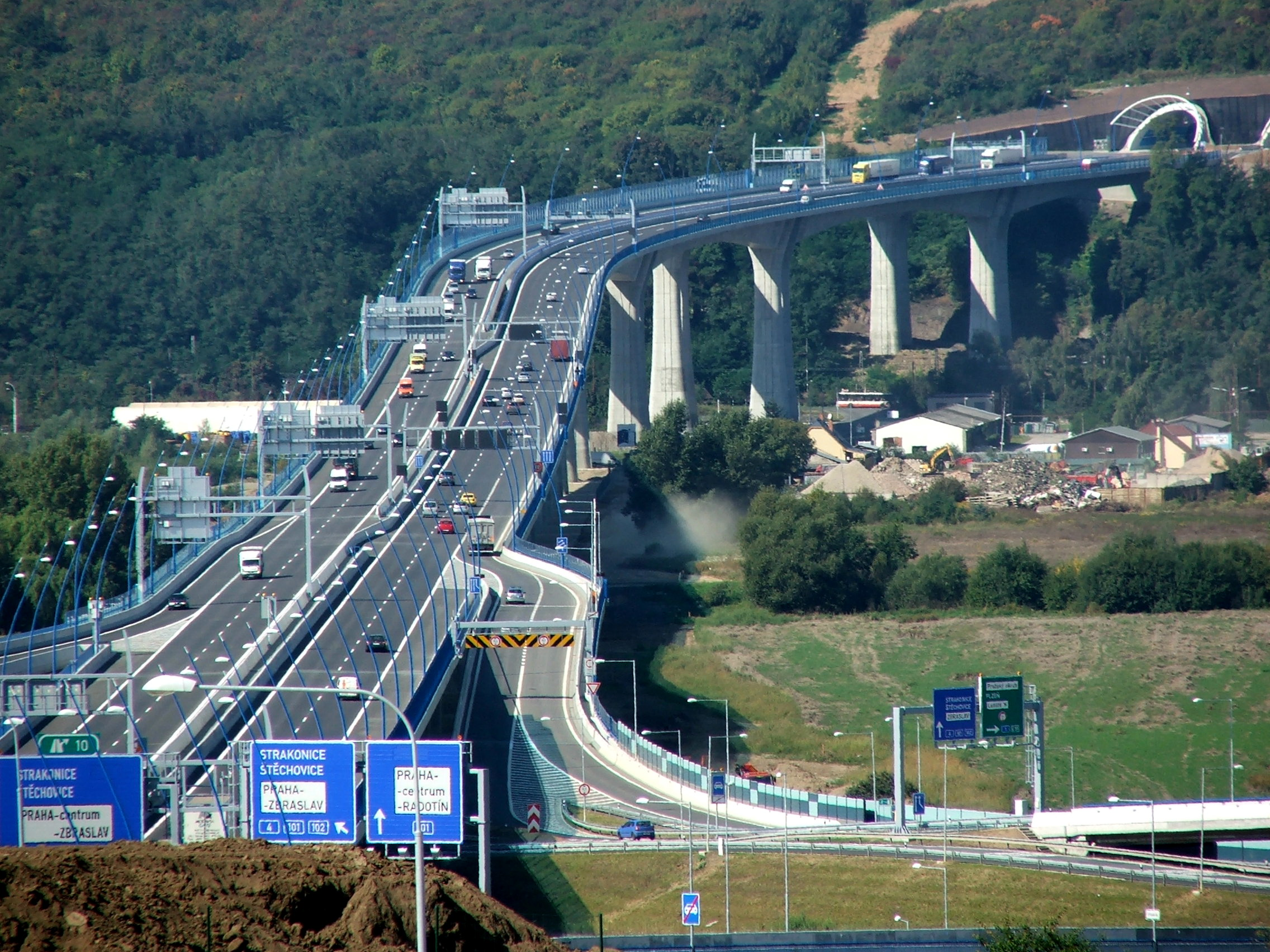
The longest road bridge in the country, Radotínský most

=== Motorcars up to 3.5 tonnes ===
Each vehicle needs to purchase time-based fee, also known as electronic vignette, before entering the motorway. This can be paid online or in selected official selling places with validity of 1 day (200 CZK), 10 days (270 CZK), 1 month (410 CZK) or 365 days (2300 CZK) . The price of the vignettes is reduced by half for cars with LPG/CNG or biomethane costing 100, 130, 200 and 1150 CZK, respectively. For plug-in hybrids the cost is roughly quarter of the price for regular cars 50, 60, 100 and 570 CZK, respectively. However, there are many unofficial websites and unofficial selling places which may charge extra fees or provide bad exchange rates.

Electronic vignettes replaced the windscreen toll vignette (dálniční známka or dálniční kupón) in 2021.

A green motorway road sign means that a paid e-vignette toll is obligatory unless stated otherwise (usually sections from the border to the closest exit or close to large cities). Only sections not subject to e-vignette are designated with an additional road sign (see below).

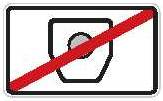
A road sign indicating that a motorway sections is not subject to electronic vignette. ≤ 3.5t (placed under the road sign for motorway)

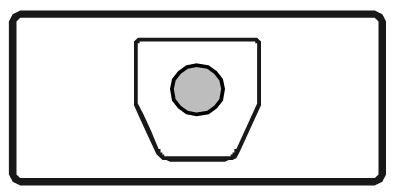
A road sign indicating the beginning of the motorway electronic vignette (paid on a specific license plate of a vehicle) duty for cars ≤ 3.5t (placed under the road sign for the motorway after the end of toll-free section)

For 2025, the following motorway sections are subject to the time-based electronic vignette duty for motor cars up to 3.5 t:

List of motorway sections
Motorway	Motorway route subject to a time-based fee (compulsory electronic toll vignette)	km L
	Modletice (exit 76) – Prague-Slivenec (exit 16)	23
D1	Průhonice (exit 6) – Kývalka (exit 182)	176
D1	Holubice (exit 210) – Kroměříž-západ (exit 258)	48
D1	Kroměříž-východ (exit 260) – Říkovice (exit 272)	12
D1	Přerov-Předmostí (exit 282) – Ostrava-Rudná (exit 354)	72
D2	Brno-Chrlice (exit 3) – border with Slovakia (exit 61) – in the direction from Slovakia subject to a charge from km 55.5 (rest area Lanžhot)	58
D3	Mezno (exit 62) – Čekanice (exit 76)	14
D3	Měšice (exit 79) – Veselí nad Lužnicí, sever (exit 104)	25
D3	Veselí nad Lužnicí, jih (exit 107) – Úsilné (exit 131)	24
D3	Roudné (exit 141) – Kaplice-nádraží (exit 159)	18
D4	Jíloviště (exit 9) – Třebkov (exit 84)	75
D5	Prague-Třebonice (exit 1) – Beroun-východ (exit 14)	14
D5	Beroun-západ (exit 22) – Ejpovice (exit 67)	45
D5	Sulkov (exit 89) – border with Germany (exit 151) – in the direction from Germany subject to a charge from km 149.7 (rest area Rozvadov)	62
	Jeneč (exit 7) – Bukov (exit 62)	55
D7	Kněževes (exit 3) – Knovíz (exit 18)	15
D8	Zdiby (exit 1) – Řehlovice (exit 64)	64
D8	Knínice (exit 80) – border with Germany (exit 92) – in the direction from Germany subject to a charge from exit 64 Řehlovice	12
	Stará Boleslav (exit 14) – Bezděčín (exit 39)	25
	Kosmonosy (exit 46) – Ohrazenice (exit 71)	25
D11	Jirny (exit 8) – Jaroměř-sever (exit 113)	105
	Sedlice (exit 127) – Ostrov (exit 158)	31
	Mohelnice-jih (exit 235) – Olomouc-západ (exit 263)	28
	Olomouc-Holice (exit 276) – Lipník nad Bečvou (exit 296)	20
D46	Vyškov-východ (exit 1) – Prostějov-jih (exit 21)	21
D46	Držovice (exit 26) – Hněvotín (exit 37)	11
D48	Bělotín (exit 1) – Jeseník nad Odrou (exit 8)	8
D48	Palačov (km 12) – Nový Jičín-centrum (exit 21)	8
D48	Rybí (exit 24) – Frýdek-Místek východ (exit 52)	28
D48	Dobrá (exit 54) – Žukov (exit 70)	16
	Hulín (exit 1) – Fryšták (km 18)	18
	Rajhrad (exit 10) – Pohořelice-sever (exit 23)	13
	Hulín (exit 16) – Otrokovice-sever (exit 30)	14
	Babice (exit 42) – Bzenec (exit 64)	22
D56	Ostrava-Hrabová, průmyslová zóna (exit 40) – Frýdek-Místek (exit 54)	14

=== Vehicles over 3.5 tonnes ===
Electronic toll applies to vehicles over 3.5 tons.

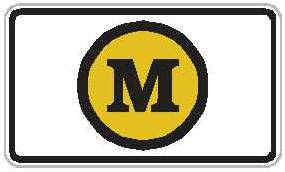
A road sign informing of the beginning of the electronic toll duty for vehicles > 3.5t

A road sign informing of the beginning of both motorway vignette (toll label) and electronic toll duty

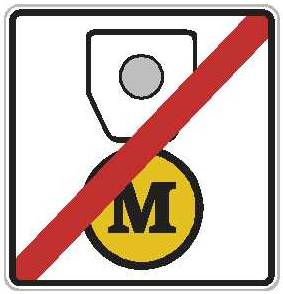
A road sign informing of the motorway section subject to neither motorway vignette (toll label) nor electronic toll duty

== History ==
=== Motorways ===
==== Before the Second World War ====
Plan of the motorway network for the First Czechoslovak Republic (1935)

Plan of the motorway network for the Protectorate of Bohemia and Moravia within the Nazi Germany and the Slovak Republic (1939)

Plans of the motorway network for the Czechoslovak Socialist Republic (1963)

The first informal plan for a motorway (first called in Czech autostráda or dálková silnice) in Czechoslovakia date back to 1935. This was to link Prague through Slovakia with the easternmost Czechoslovak territory, Carpathian Ruthenia (now Zakarpattia Oblast in Ukraine). The terminus was to be at Velykyy Bychkiv (Velký Bočkov in Czech) on the Romanian border. The definitive route, including a Prague ring motorway, was approved shortly after the Munich Agreement on 4 November 1938, with a planned speed limit of 120 km/h.

The Nazi authorities also made the second Czecho-Slovak Republic, already a German satellite state, build a part of the Reichsautobahn Breslau - Vienna as an extraterritorial German motorway with border checkpoints at each motorway exit. However, only a construction of the route within Bohemia and Moravia was initiated, but never finished. It still sporadically appears in some current Czech motorway plans.

On 1 December 1938 Nazi Germany had already initiated a construction of the so-called Sudetenautobahn (in Sudetenland, before the Munich agreement part of Czechoslovakia, then of Germany) in the route Streitau (Bavaria) – Eger – Carlsbad – Lobositz – Böhmisch Leipa – Reichenberg (capital of Sudetenland) – Görlitz (in Prussia, now in Saxony). The autobahn has never been finished, but some remnants in the landscape close to Pomezí nad Ohří, Cheb/Eger and Liberec/Reichenberg are still prominent and an unfinished part from Svárov via Machnín to Chrastava was used in the construction of the I/35 road.

==== Nazi occupation ====
Czechoslovakia was broken up with a declaration of independence by the Slovak Republic and by the short-lived Carpatho-Ukraine which was a prelude to the German occupation of Bohemia and Moravia on 15 March 1939. It was decided to build the motorway only as far as the Slovak border. The technical parameters of motorways (speed limit of 140 – 160 km/h) were adjusted to those of the German Reichsautobahn, as Czech (Bohemian-Moravian) motorways were to be integrated within the German Reichsautobahn network.

The project for the first segment Prague - Lužná was ready in January 1939, and construction in Moravia began on 24 January in Chřiby on the Zástřizly - Lužná segment. The construction in Bohemia from Prague began on 2 May 1939, with a switch to right-hand traffic in Bohemia and Moravia having already gone without a hitch. The motorway should have reached Brno in 1940, but building materials and labour shortages due to an absolute priority given to the Nazi armament industry delayed the work considerably. The construction in the route of approx. 77 km from Prague towards Brno advanced notably, but a prohibition of all civil constructions by the German authorities came into force in 1942.

==== After the Second World War ====
After the Second World War, the completion of only the first and unfinished 77 km of the motorway Prague – Brno as far as Humpolec was approved by the Government in November 1945 and was reinaugurated in 1946. The part-built construction sites of the Sudetenautobahn (28 km) were completely abandoned, as well as that of the Breslau – Vienna motorway (84 km). The latter was, however, incorporated in some plans as a future connection motorway between Brno and the D35 motorway. The 77 km of the Prague – Humpolec motorway had been completed except for some large bridges and a concrete surface when the new communist government decided to discontinue the work completely in early 1950.

Only on 8 August 1967 the Government of the Socialist Republic of Czechoslovakia resolved to continue the construction of motorways by adopting a new motorway plan for the whole country and resolved to continue the already twice interrupted construction of the motorway Prague - Brno (number D1) and further Brno - Bratislava (D2). The construction was solemnly inaugurated on 8 September 1967. Due to a change of technical parameters, some bridges finished before 1950 were replaced. The Prague - Brno motorway (D1), initiated on 2 May 1939, reached Brno in 1980, a full 40 years after the originally scheduled opening.

The pace of construction of motorways has always been rather slow up to the present day. The first 100 km of motorways on the territory of today's Czech Republic were completed in 1975, 500 km in 1985, 1,000 km in 2007 and 1,500 km in 2024. Funding for the construction of motorways was radically reduced after the financial crisis in 2008 due to draconian budget cuts, and is currently gaining momentum rather slowly for various reasons.

==== Future plans ====
Planning for further development of the motorway network continues to the present day. In April 2025, the Ministry of Transport published a new map outlining the planned expansion of the Czech motorway and road network, based on the study Opportunities and Possibilities for the Development of the Motorway and Highway Network after 2050. The study presents a theoretical proposal emphasizing the connection of regional capitals, improved traffic quality, and the provision of alternative long-distance routes in case of closures or detours. The total length of the main corridors identified for further monitoring is approximately 540 km. Construction costs for these sections are estimated at around CZK 320 billion (at 2021 price levels), with a total projected investment of CZK 360 billion including supplementary corridors. Key proposed routes include D20 (Plzeň – Písek – Jihlava), D19 (Domašov – Prostějov), and the Central Bohemian Ring Road D99. The precise routing and implementation of these new motorways will be subject to future feasibility studies and negotiations with regional and local authorities, with the Ministry emphasizing the need to reach a broad societal consensus.

=== Other highways ===
Until 1938, separate lands of Czechoslovakia have different laws and road systems, inherited from the Austro-Hungarian period. Just in 1938, a unified Czechoslovak road act passed. In 1935, there existed Czechoslovak state roads (not distinguished by class) and several types of non-state public roads:

- in Bohemia, silnice zemské (land roads), silnice okresní (district roads), silnice a cesty obecní (municipal roads and ways) (there was only one remained 23 km land road in Bohemia, connecting Jilemnice, Vysoké nad Jizerou and Rokytnice nad Jizerou)
- in Moravia, silnice okresní (district roads) of 1st and 2nd class, silnice a cesty obecní (municipal roads and ways)
- in Czech Silesia, silnice okresní (district roads) of 1st and 2nd class, silnice a cesty obecní (municipal roads and ways) and veřejné cesty interesentů (public ways of interesents)
- in Slovakia and Zakarpattia, zemské cesty (land roads, formerly župné cesty, župa roads), príjezdné cesty (access roads), vicinální cesty (vicinal roads), cesty obecné (municipal roads and ways) and cesty interesentů (ways of interesents).

Thus, in the Moravian-Silesian Land existed no land roads, in Slovakia and Zakarpattia were no district roads but existed a special class of "access roads", and in Bohemian and Moravia existed not a status of "public ways of interesents".

Historically, local communications is a successor term for the former obecní silnice (municipal roads) and obecní cesty (municipal ways). The terms "utilitarian communications" replaced the former term cesty interesentů or zájemnické cesty (ways of interesents) since 1961. However, in Bohemia and Moravia, public way on a private plot was concepted as a municipal way before the 1961 reform, and maintained by the municipality.

Příjezdní komunikace (access communications) to the railway stations were a special class of roads before 1938 in Slovakia nad Zakarpattia. Since 1938, access communications to railway stations, airports and ports should be built as municipal roads or district roads, as was the previous praxis in Bohemia, Moravia and Silesia. Paradoxically, the today's main access road to the main Prague airport (Václav Havel International Airport in Prague-Ruzyně) is a private property of the airport and has a status of a "utilitarian communication".

Czechoslovak act no. 147/1949 Sb. nationalized all previous státní (state), zemské (land), and okresní (district) roads and authorized the government to list other individual roads (vicinal, municipal and others) to be nationalized) or negotiate a transfer of redundant state roads to administration by municipalities. The Czechoslovak act no. 135/1961 Sb. stated a terminology and classification which is in essence continued in today's Czech Republic and Slovakia.

== Motorways ==
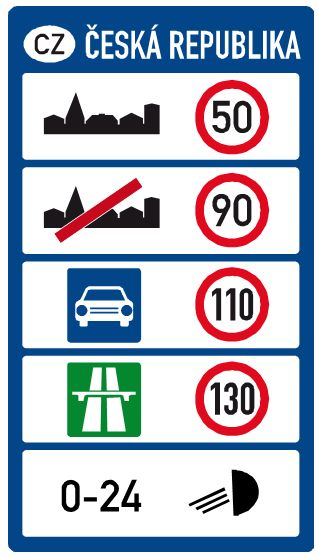
Border road sign with general speed limits in the Czech Republic

The motorways in the Czech Republic, Czech: dálnice (abbr. D) are dual carriageways with an emergency hard shoulder or emergency lay-bys. The default speed limit is 130 km/h or 81 mph, which will be locally raised by signage to 150 km/h or 93 mph. Their highway shields are white on red and direction signs are white on green. As of August 2026, the Czech motorway network comprises 18 motorways. All of them are at least partially operational, and 7 (D1, D2, D5, D8, D10, D46, and D56) have been completed.

The motorway number usually reflects the number of the former highway alongside which it was built up or which it replaced. After the construction of the motorway, the affected highway is degraded to a regional road, in most cases numbered as 6xx. For instance, after the completion of the D8 motorway (Prague – Lovosice), the previous highway I/8 between Prague and Lovosice became a regional road 608. Regional roads are maintained by the self-governing regions) and not by the state directly.

Motorway	Name of motorway	Motorway route	Operational (km)	% operational	In construction (km)	Planned Total length (km)	Maximum AADT
	D0	Prague Ring (Pražský okruh)	41	49%	12.6	83	75,092
D1	D1	Prague – Jihlava – Brno – Vyškov – Hulín – Přerov – Lipník nad Bečvou – Bělotín – Ostrava – Bohumín – Poland (motorway A 1)	371	100%		371	99,265
D2	D2	Brno – Břeclav – Slovakia (motorway)	61	100%		61	50,905
D3	D3	Prague – Tábor – České Budějovice – Dolní Dvořiště – Austria (expressway)	97	57%	15.5	171	14,097
D4	D4	Via Salis (Prague – Příbram – Třebkov)	76	89%		85	29,617
D5	D5	Via Carolina (Prague – Beroun – Rokycany – Plzeň – Rozvadov – Germany (motorway A 6))	151	100%		151	58,760
	D6	Prague – Karlovy Vary – Sokolov – Cheb – Pomezí nad Ohří – Germany (bundesstraße)	108	68%	28.1	169	39,449
D7	D7	Prague – Louny – Chomutov	54	69%	16.7	79	33,479
D8	D8	Prague – Lovosice – Ústí nad Labem – Krásný Les – Germany (motorway A 17)	96	100%		96	48,003
	D10	Prague – Mladá Boleslav – Turnov	71	100%		71	43,430
D11	D11	Prague – Poděbrady – Hradec Králové – Jaroměř – Trutnov – Královec – Poland (expressway S 3)	115	73%	21.2	156	43,986
	D35	Úlibice – Hradec Králové – Svitavy – Mohelnice – Olomouc – Lipník nad Bečvou	121	59%	48.2	205	34,055
D46	D46	Vyškov – Prostějov – Olomouc	38	100%		38	36,136
D48	D48	Bělotín – Nový Jičín – Frýdek-Místek – Český Těšín	62	80%	3.7	77	18,642
D49	D49	Hulín – Fryšták – Vizovice – Střelná – Slovakia (expressway)	17	49%		35	
	D52	Brno – Pohořelice – Mikulov – Austria (motorway)	17	37%		45	23,535
	D55	Olomouc – Přerov – Hulín – Otrokovice – Hodonín – Břeclav	49	50%		99	16,102
D56	D56	Ostrava – Frýdek-Místek	14	100%		14	24,957
	Total		1551	76%	153.8	1995	

Originally, motorway D47 was planned from Brno to Ostrava and construction in the section Lipník nad Bečvou - Ostrava started under this number, but in the end the ŘSD in 2006 decided that the D47 should be classified as an extension of the D1 motorway.

== Highways for motorcars ==
Highways for motorcars do not form a network on their own, they are just upgraded sections of regular highways. Highways for motorcars are not subject to tolls for vehicles with total weight up to 3.5 t. The signs on highways for motorcars consist of white text on a blue background, like on other highways and unlike on motorways, where the background is green. Exits, like on motorways, are usually numbered. The speed limit is 110 km/h.

=== List of completed highways for motorcars ===
Name	Route
Městský okruh Praha MO (previously I/29)(Prague City Ring)	Rybníčky – Krč – Braník – Smíchov – Břevnov – Troja
Chodovská radiála I/8 (Chodov Trunk Road in Prague)	Pankrác - Průhonice (motorway )
Radlická radiála I/5 (Radlice Trunk Road in Prague)	Bucharova St. - Třebonice (motorway )
Vysočanská radiála I/10 (Vysočany Trunk Road in Prague)	Kbelská St.- Satalice (motorway and )
Štěrboholská spojka I/12 (Štěrboholy Trunk Road in Prague)	Rybníčky - Běhochovice (motorway )
Spořilovská spojka (Spořilov Trunk Road in Prague)	Chodovská St.- Chodov (motorway )
I/6	Dvory – Jenišov (motorway )
I/7	Spořice (motorway ) - Chomutov
I/10	Ohrazenice (motorway ) - Ohrazenice
I/11	Mokré Lazce - Ostrava-Poruba
I/20	Nová Hospoda (motorway )- Písek
I/23	Brno-západ (motorway ) – Brno-Bauerova St.
I/26	Plzeň-K Fořtovně St.- Ejpovice (motorway )
I/27	Plzeň-Dobřanská St.(motorway ) – Vysoká u Dobřan
I/34	České Budějovice - Úsilné (motorway ) - Lišov, interchange Na Klaudě St.
I/35	Liberec-Hodkovická St.- Ohrazenice (motorway )
I/35	Křelov - Olomouc
I/37	Hradec Králové – Pardubice
I/43	Česká – Brno-Křižíkova St.
I/44	Vlachov - Rájec, Postřelmov ring road
I/48	Český Těšín (motorway ) – Chotěbuz
I/50	Brno-Gajdošova St.– Brno-východ (motorway )
I/63	Bystřany - Řehlovice (motorway )

Planned upgrade to highways for motorcars:

- I/7 Spořice - Křimov
- I/13 Chomutov - Teplice (some parts)
- I/13 Ostrov - Karlovy Vary
- I/11 Ostrava-Vítkovice - Šenov
- I/14 Liberec: interchange I/35 - roundabout Kunratice (direction Jablonec n. N.)
- I/35 roundabout Hrádek nad Nisou - Liberec, interchange Hodkovická St.(inc. border road, only a single carriageway road)

== Opening of new motorways ==
The length of the motorway network is planned to be expanded to 2,000 km by 2030.

Construction of new motorways in recent years has been hampered due to corruption scandals and austerity measures as well as owing to new European rules under which old EIA assessments lapsed. See the table below. However, this should improve slightly in next years. By the end of 2017, there were 58.2 km of new motorways under construction, in 2018 a construction of further 130.3 km should be initiated (apart from the ongoing reconstruction of the motorway D1). Nonetheless, only 18.1 km of new motorways may open to public in 2018, 18.8 km in 2019 and 29.7 in 2020.

While in 2021 47 km of new motorways were opened, in 2022 it was 21 km but in 2023 it was only 15.4 km. In 2024 the length of new motorways opened reached an all-time record of 94 km.

Between 1971 and 2014 the average year pace of completion of new motorways was 28.2 km a year.

Motorway	From	To	Length	Construction started	Due to open	Remarks
D1	Běchovice	D1	12.6 km	12/2024	2027	
D3	Kaplice train station	Nažidla	8.6 km	06/2024	2027	
D6	Petrohrad	Lubenec	12.1 km	11/2024	2028	
D6	Bošov	Knínice	7.9 km	03/2025	2027	
D6	Knínice	Žalmanov	6.9 km	07/2025	2027	
D7	Aviatická	Ruzyně	1.1 km	04/2026	2027	
D7	Knovíz	Slaný West	6.4 km	11/2024	2027	widening
D7	Slaný West	Kutrovice	3.4 km	12/2024	2027	widening
D7	Kutrovice	Panenský Týnec	6.8 km	12/2024	2027	widening
D11	Jaroměř	Trutnov	19.6 km	04/2026	2029	
D11	Trutnov	Královec - border with Poland	21.2 km	10/2024	2028	
D35	Úlibice	Hořice	16.4 km	04/2026	2029	
D35	Sadová	Plotiště	6.3 km	09/2024	2026	
D35	Ostrov	Vysoké Mýto	6.2 km	05/2024	2026	
D35	Ostrov	Vysoké Mýto	0.5 km	05/2024	2027	tunnel
D35	Džbánov	Litomyšl	7.6 km	04/2024	2027	
D35	Litomyšl	Janov	10.4 km	02/2025	2027	
	Lešná	Palačov	3.7 km	06/2023	2026	

== See also ==
- Transport in the Czech Republic
- List of controlled-access highway systems
- Evolution of motorway construction in European nations
