= D46 motorway (Czech Republic) =

Motorway in the Czech Republic

D46 Motorway
- Dálnice D46

Route information
- Part of E462
- Length: 37 km (23 mi)

Major junctions
- From: D1 near Vyškov
- D35 near Olomouc
- To: Olomouc

Location
- Country: Czech Republic
- Regions: South Moravia, Olomouc
- Major cities: Vyškov, Prostějov, Olomouc

Highway system
- Highways in the Czech Republic
← D43	→ D48

D46 motorway (Czech: Dálnice D46) is a motorway in eastern Czech Republic, which runs from Vyškov via Prostějov to Olomouc where it ends and connects to the national road network.

In the time-based toll system, the D46 motorway is tolled along its entire length, i.e. from the Vyškov-východ off-ramp (exit 1) to the end of the motorway after the Slavonín off-ramp (exit 37).

== History ==
The construction of 38 km of the D46 began in 1972, with the first section finished in 1974. It was not until 1992 that the full length of the projected motorway could be driven over. Originally, the D46 was actually an expressway. It was officially turned into a motorway in December 2015. Currently, it is still used as an alternative to the D1 motorway. Capacity-wise, however, the narrow S 20.5/100 category road is no longer sufficient.

=== Future modernizations ===
The D46 motorway is completed in its entire length according to the current motorway network concept. Therefore, all upcoming projects concern only construction modifications of already completed sections.

A rest area, MÚK Držovice is planned for 2030.

== Images ==
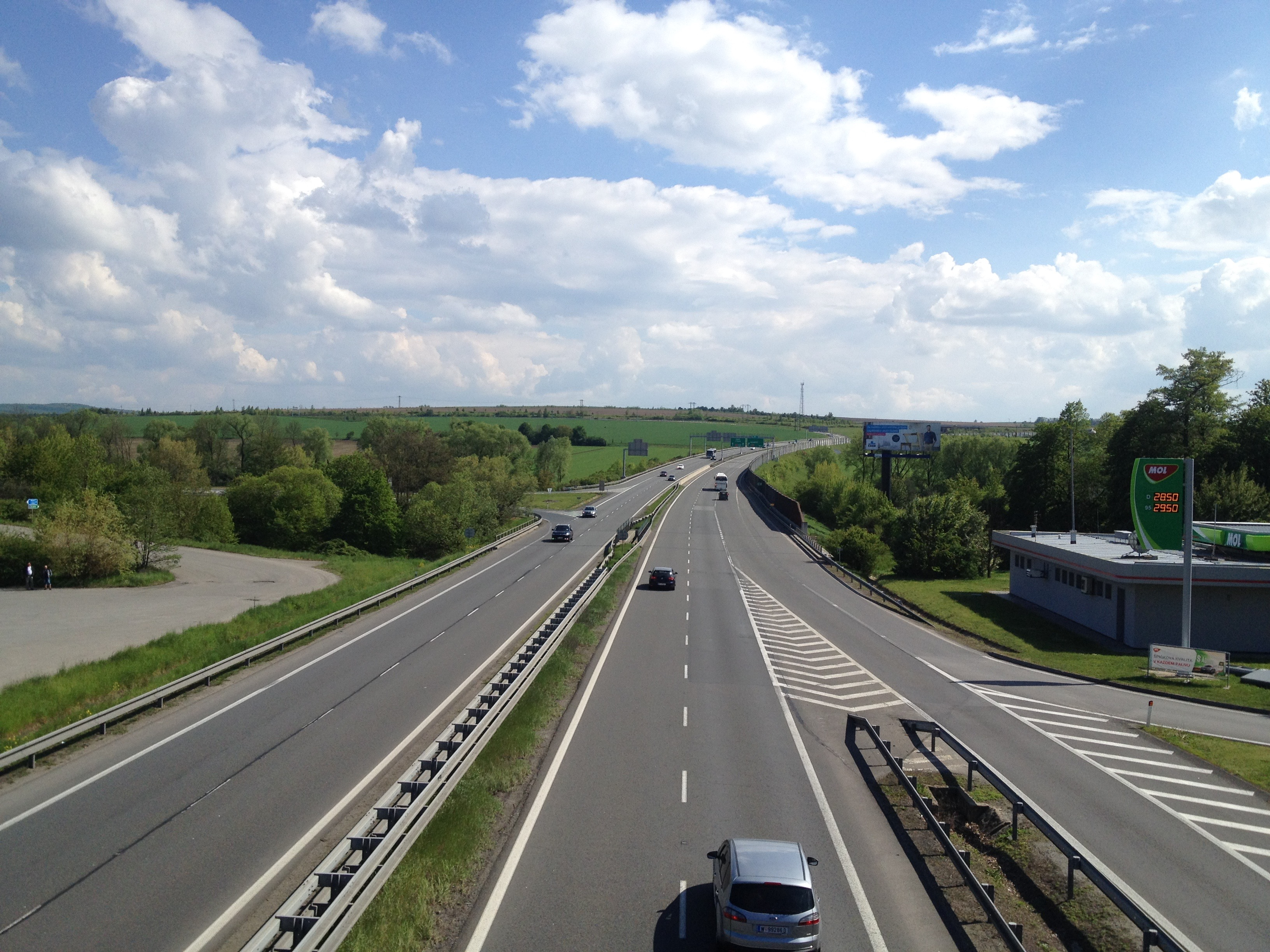
Motorway D46 on its 1st kilometr in direction to Vyškov at interchange Vyškov.

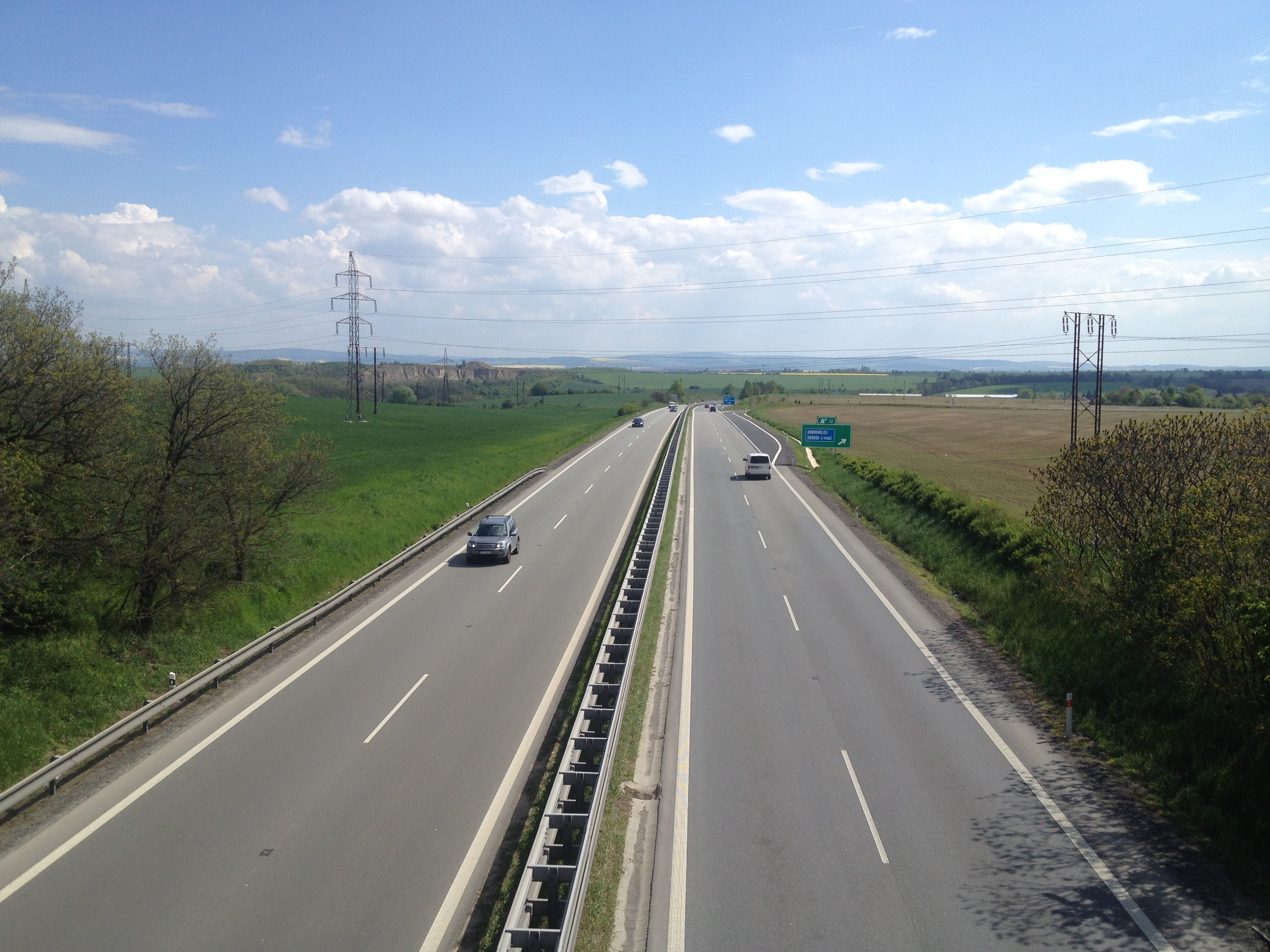
Motorway D46 on its 13th kilometr in direction to Vyškov at bridge near Brodek u Prostějova.

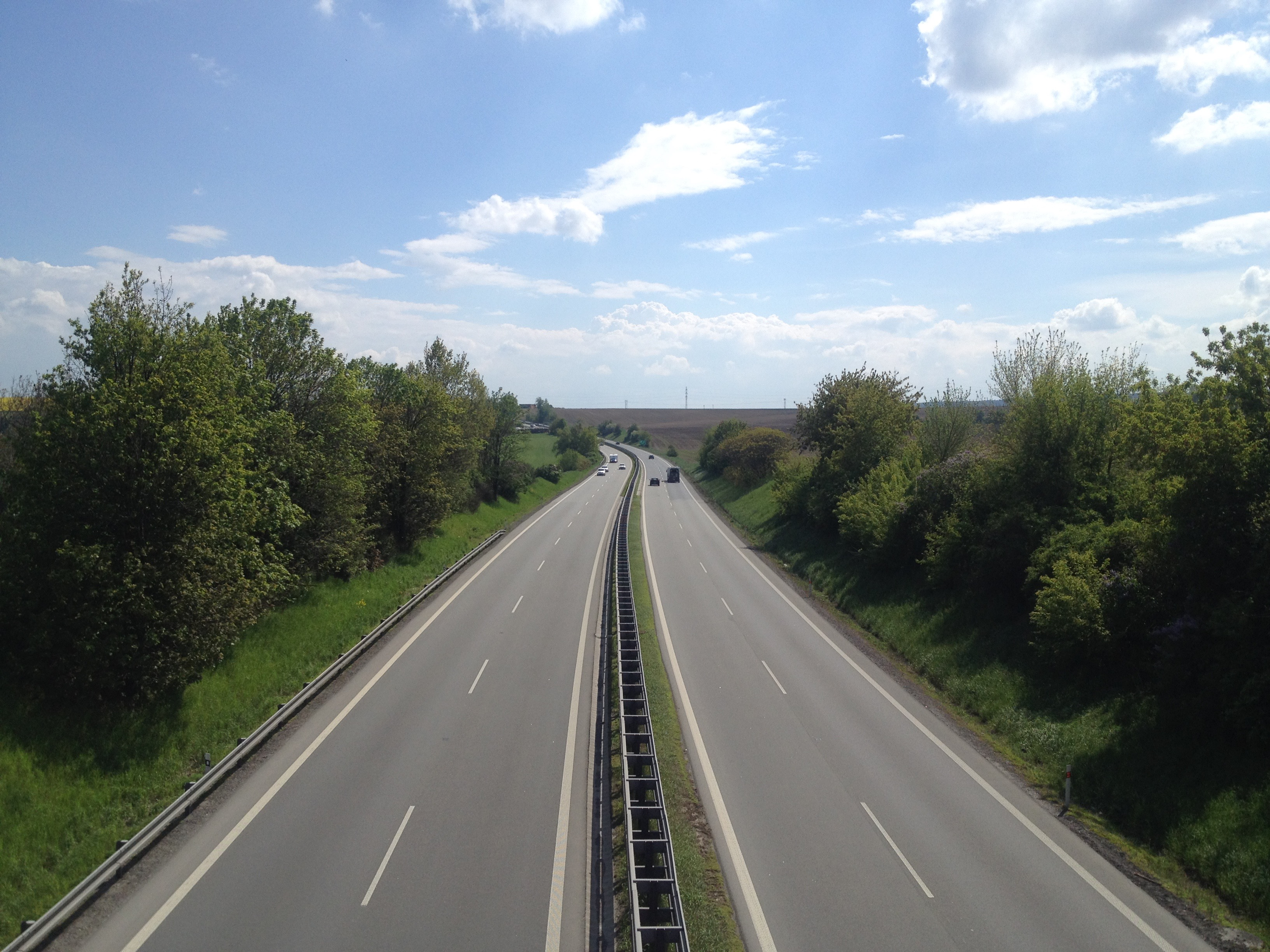
Motorway D46 on its 15th kilometr in direction to Vyškov at bridge near Dobrochov.

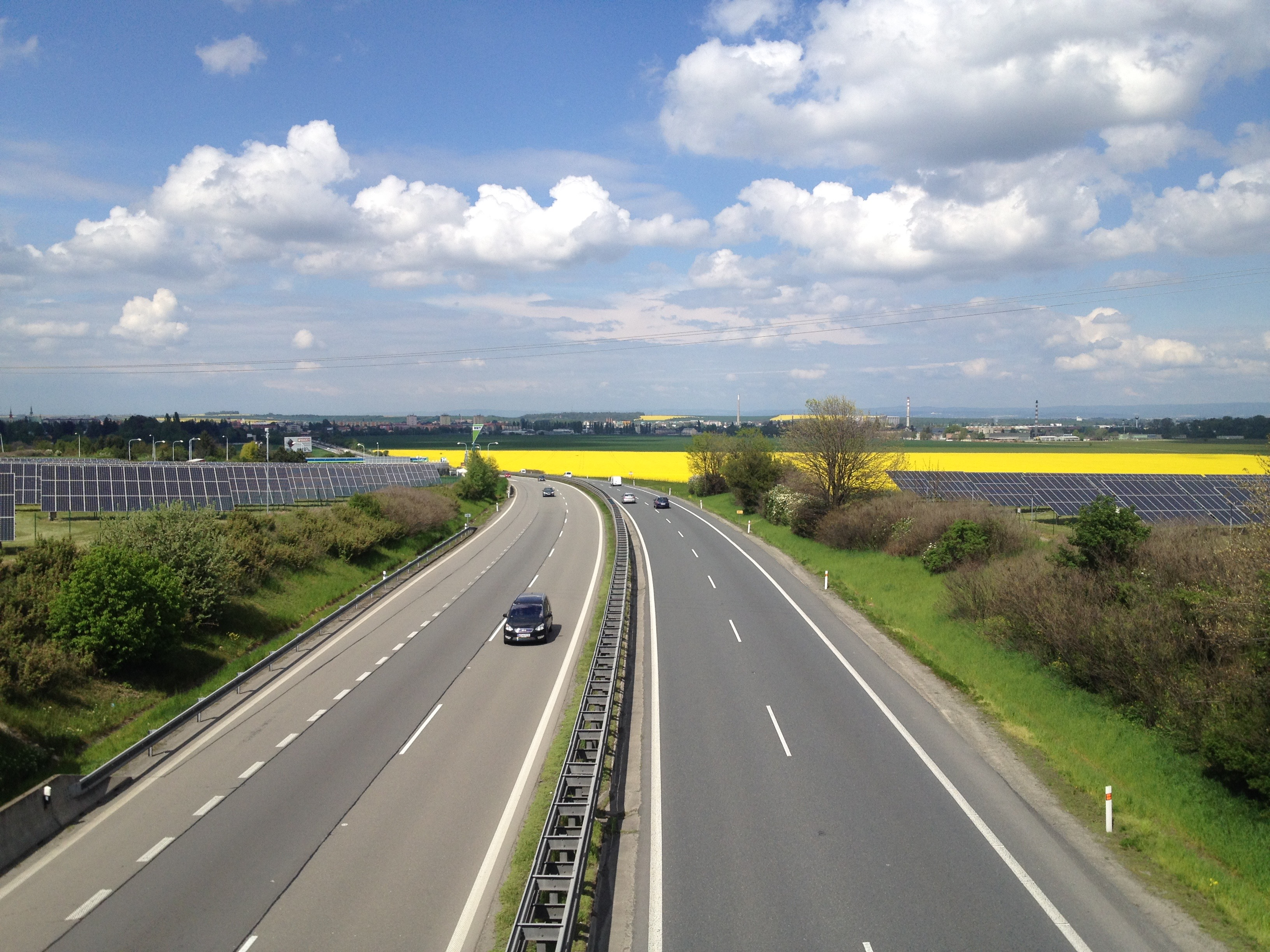
Motorway D46 on its 22nd kilometr in direction to Olomouc at interchange Prostějov-jih.

== Route description ==
Country	Region	Location	km	mi	Exit	Name	Destinations	Notes
Czech Republic	South Moravian Region	South Moravian Region	0	0.0	—			Kilometrage starting point
Czech Republic	South Moravian Region	South Moravian Region	1	0.62	—	Vyškov-východ	D1 E462	
Czech Republic	South Moravian Region	South Moravian Region			Rest area	Odpočívka Vyškov		
Czech Republic	South Moravian Region	South Moravian Region	2	1.2	—	Vyškov	I/47	
Czech Republic	South Moravian Region	South Moravian Region			Rest area	Odpočívka Prusy		
Czech Republic	South Moravian Region	South Moravian Region			Rest area	Odpočívka Pustiměř		
Czech Republic	South Moravian Region	South Moravian Region	7	4.3	—	Drysice		
Czech Republic	Olomouc Region	Olomouc Region	13	8.1	—	Brodek u Prostějova		
Czech Republic	Olomouc Region	Olomouc Region	17	11	—	Vranovice-Kelčice		
Czech Republic	Olomouc Region	Olomouc Region	22	14	—	Prostějov-jih		
Czech Republic	Olomouc Region	Olomouc Region			Rest area	Odpočívka Žešov		
Czech Republic	Olomouc Region	Olomouc Region	24	15	—	Prostějov-centrum		
Czech Republic	Olomouc Region	Olomouc Region	27	17	—	Držovice		
Czech Republic	Olomouc Region	Olomouc Region	33	21	—	Olšany u Prostějova		
Czech Republic	Olomouc Region	Olomouc Region			Rest area	Odpočívka Žerůvky		
Czech Republic	Olomouc Region	Olomouc Region	37	23	—	Hněvotín		
Czech Republic	Olomouc Region	Olomouc Region	37	23	—	Slavonin	D35 E442 E462	
1.000 mi = 1.609 km; 1.000 km = 0.621 mi
