= D1 motorway (Czech Republic) =

Motorway in the Czech Republic

D1 Motorway
- Dálnice D1
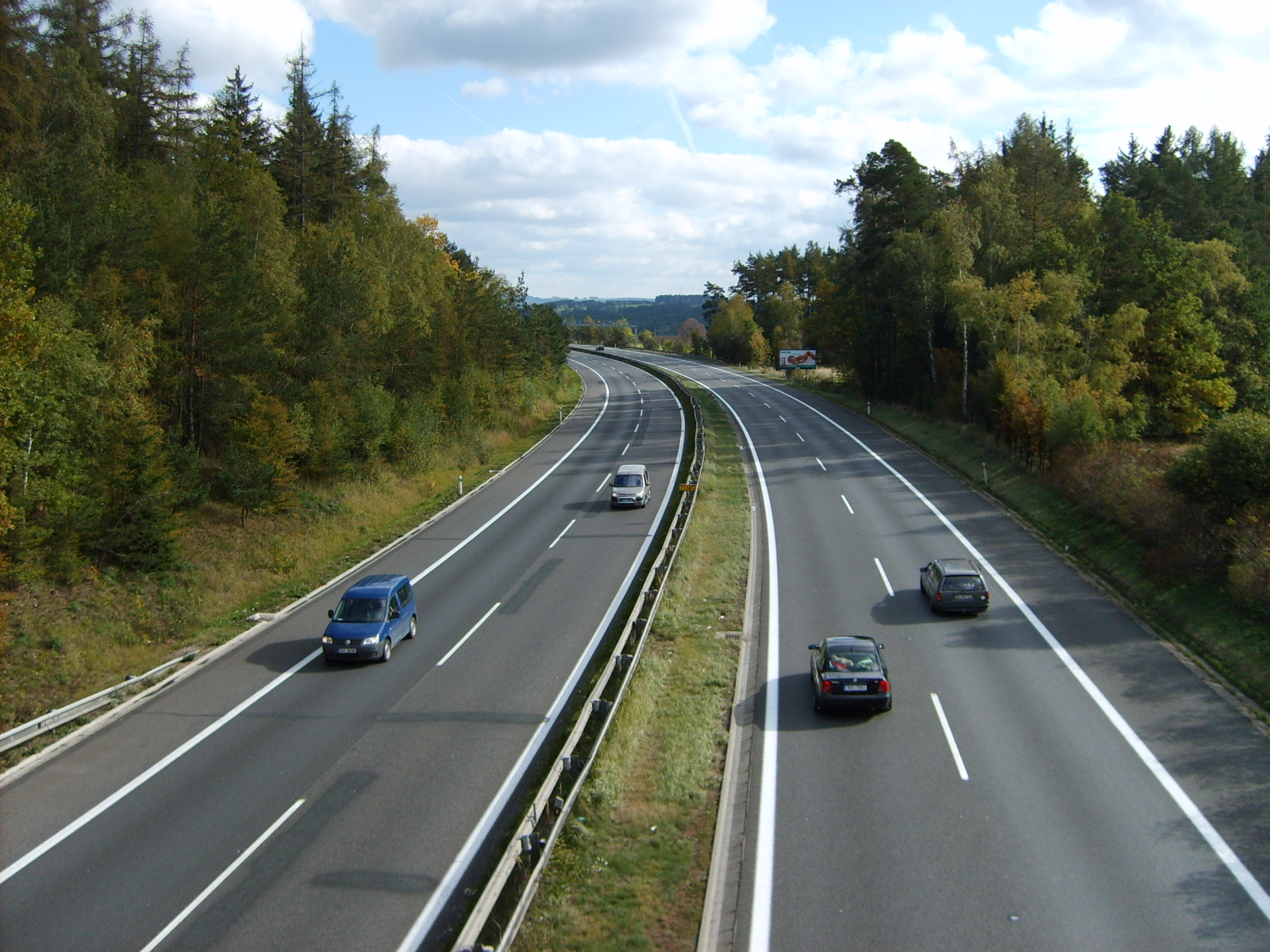

Route information
- Part of E50 E55 E59 E65 E462
- Length: 376.5 km (233.9 mi)

Major junctions
- From: D0 in Prague
- D0 near Dobřejovice; D52 near Brno; D2 near Brno; D46 near Vyškov; D55 / D49 near Hulín; D55 near Přerov (planned); D35 near Lipník nad Bečvou; D48 near Bělotín; D56 in Ostrava
- To: Polish border at Věřňovice

Location
- Country: Czech Republic
- Regions: Prague, Central Bohemian, Vysočina, South Moravian, Zlín, Olomouc, Moravian-Silesian
- Major cities: Prague, Jihlava, Brno, Přerov, Ostrava

Highway system
- Highways in the Czech Republic
← D0	→ D2

Map of D1 motorway

The D1 motorway (Czech: Dálnice D1) is the longest motorway in the Czech Republic linking Prague, Brno, and Ostrava, the three largest cities in the country, and once reaching the Polish border, it continues as the A1 autostrada (Poland). Its length is 376.5 km (233.9 mi) since its completion in December 2025. It is the busiest motorway in the Czech Republic, with a maximum AADT of 99,000 vehicles per day near Prague.

== Chronology ==
=== First attempt ===
The Munich Agreement in 1938 deprived the country of some fundamental road and rail routes. The government rushed to prepare three major infrastructure projects: the Německý Brod – Brno railway; the Plzeň – Ostrava road; and a 4-lane highway from Prague to Velký Bočkov (on the Czechoslovak – Romanian border). On 23 December 1938 the government issued Decree no. 372/1938 Coll. concerning the construction of motorways, establishing the General Motorway Directorate. This decree called for construction of an east-west motorway within four years.

As of January 1939, the General Motorway Directorate had 108 employees. On 13 January 1939, the Prague – Jihlava – Brno – Slovak border motorway project was approved, and construction was started on two segments: Chodov (now part of Prague) – Humpolec; and Zástřizly – Lužná. The prime minister of Carpathian Ruthenia, Avgustyn Voloshyn, requested that the Slovak border – Chust segment be added to the plan as well. Construction began on the Zástřizly – Lužná segment on 24 January in Zástřizly in the Chřiby mountains.

The German occupation of Czechoslovakia brought only small technical changes to the project, and the construction of another segment, Chodov – Humpolec, began in May 1939. The increasing demands of World War II slowed down the construction, and the works were completely halted in 1942. After the war the works were resumed mainly on major bridges in 1946, but only with a small workforce.

After 1948 the works continued. But in January 1949 the segment in Chřiby was abandoned, and the Prague – Humpolec segment met the same fate one year later. All 77 km of motorway under construction at that time, including 60 bridges, remained in disuse.

=== Second attempt ===
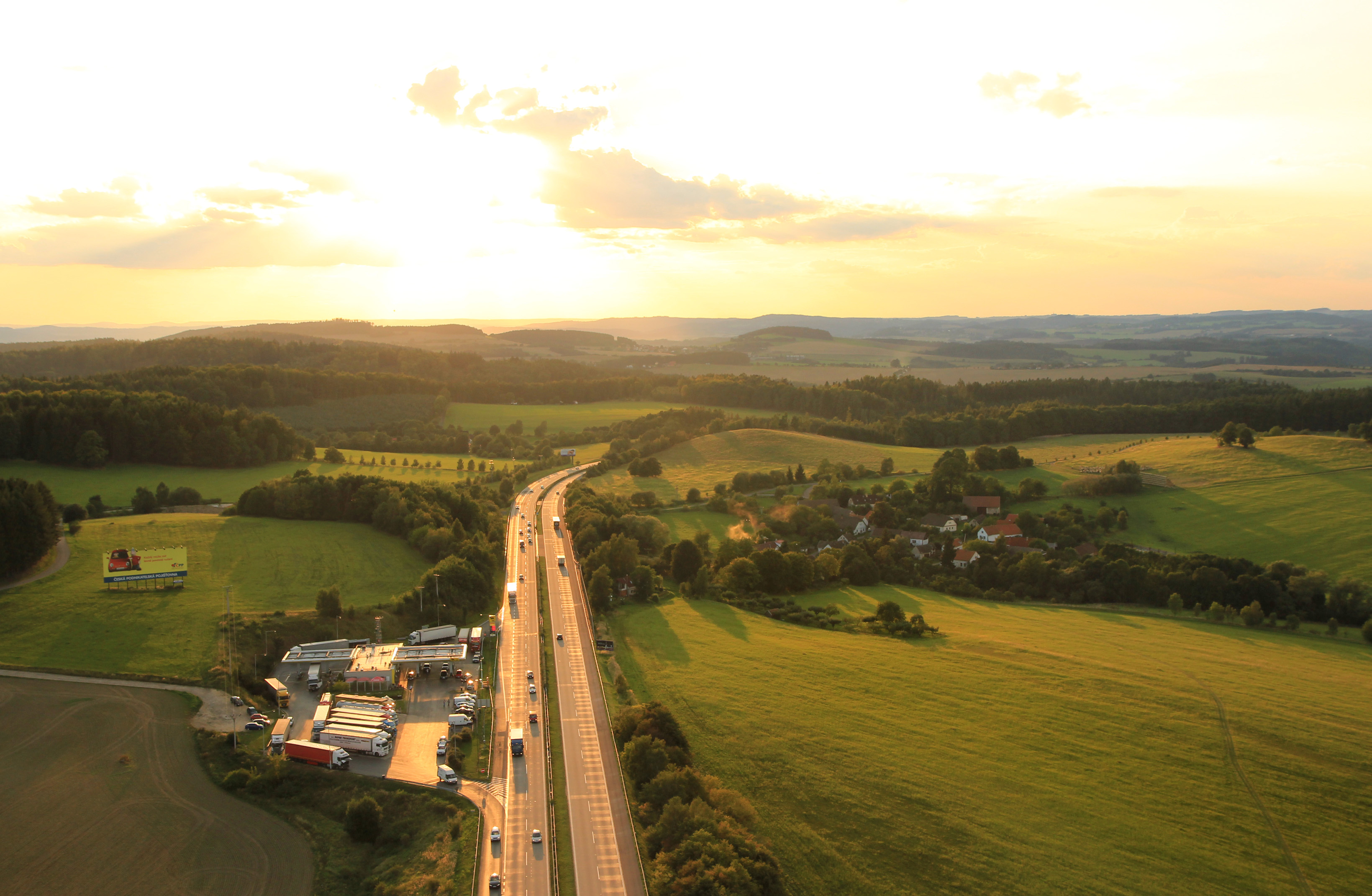
Aerial photo of D1 near Ostředek

In the 1960s, traffic was growing very quickly, and a new plan for a D1 highway from Prague to the Soviet Union border was formulated. Work on the Prague – Brno section started in 1967, mainly using the old route from the first attempt. The 21-km long Prague – Mirošovice segment was completed in July 1971, and the 205-km long route to Brno was finished in November 1980.

In Slovakia, construction started in 1973 with the 14-km long Ivachnová – Liptovský Mikuláš section, together with the construction of the Liptovská Mara dam. The 19-km Prešov – Košice motorway was added in 1980. In the late 1980s and the early 1990s the 19-km long Brno – Vyškov segment was built, along with another 20 km from Liptovský Mikuláš to Hybe in Slovakia.

After the dissolution of Czechoslovakia, construction was no longer planned to Slovakia, but instead to Lipník nad Bečvou (the replacement of the planned route is the R49 expressway). Due to growing traffic near Prague, the first segment to Mirošovice was widened from 4 lanes to 6 lanes, and there are similar plans for widening around Brno as well. After the dissolution, no new sections were built. In 2002, construction of an 18-km long extension from Vyškov eastwards started. It was opened in 2005. More extensions eastwards were opened in 2008, 2009 and 2010; in 2011, the motorway reached the junction with the R55 expressway and the R49 expressway near Hulín, and the route curved north to Přerov (and Lipník nad Bečvou).

The segment from Lipník nad Bečvou to Ostrava was constructed from 2004 – 2009. Due to historical reasons it was named the Motorway D47; however, it was opened as part of the D1. The segment from Ostrava to the Polish border (and Autostrada A1) opened in late 2012, but only for cars under 3.5 tonnes, because the Polish side had problems with the bridge at Mszana village. From 2014 the bridge is open, and it is possible to drive from Ostrava to the Polish border and on to Katowice. The Přerov – Lipník nad Bečvou segment opened in December 2019.

=== Recategorisation of the Prague section ===
In 2022, the re-categorisation of the section from the zero kilometre at Chodov across the Prague border (km 5.2) to the crossing with the Prague ring road (km 10.2) as a local road, together with the transfer of the Prague section (including buildings and land by a donation contract) to the ownership of the City of Prague was prepared. On 4 February 2022, ŘSD and Prague concluded a future donation agreement. The city council approved the plan on 17 May 2022, and the city council by resolution No. 37/42 on 26 May 2022.

The donation contract, by which the state, through ŘSD, donated the first 5.2 km of the motorway to the capital city of Prague, was concluded on 29 June 2022 and published on 19 December 2022; the contract quantified the book value of the donated property at CZK 4,793,160,294. The Prague section of the motorway (km 0 - 5.2) was re-categorised as a local first class road. In the contract, Prague undertook the task of modifying the traffic signs on the date of the Prague ring road's commissioning in the section between Běchovice, and the D1 motorway.

As of 1 January 2023, it was announced that the section km 0.0-5.2 would be transferred to the ownership of the City of Prague and removed from the toll network. The section was re-designated as a road for motor vehicles. In its Twitter message, ŘSD mistakenly informed about the transfer of the section to a Class I road, but later corrected the message that it was a transfer to a local Class I road, the spokeswoman of TSK hl. However, the Prague TSK spokesperson Barbora Lišková reportedly continued to mystify that it was a Class I road.

=== Final stretches ===
The final section to be completed was the Říkovice – Přerov segment. Construction on this segment started in 2022, and was opened to drivers on 19 December 2025.

Furthermore, in April 2025, the widening works (to three lanes in each direction) on the 1.4 kilometres (0.87 mi) long section in Brno should conclude.

== Route description ==
Country	Region	Location	km	mi	Exit	Name	Destinations	Notes
Czech Republic	Prague	Prague	0	0.0	—	Spořilov	E65	Kilometrage starting point Connects with Prague's Inner Ring Road (MO).
Czech Republic	Prague	Prague	2	1.2	—	Chodov		
Czech Republic	Central Bohemian Region	Central Bohemian Region	6	3.7	—	Průhonice Odpočívka Průhonice		By 31 December 2022 start of toll section (motorway coupon, electronic toll already in force)
Czech Republic	Central Bohemian Region	Central Bohemian Region			Rest area	Odpočívka Nupaky		
Czech Republic	Central Bohemian Region	Central Bohemian Region	10	6.2	—	Modletice	D0 E50	
Czech Republic	Central Bohemian Region	Central Bohemian Region	15	9.3	—	Všechromy		
Czech Republic	Central Bohemian Region	Central Bohemian Region			Rest area	Odpočívka Božkov		
Czech Republic	Central Bohemian Region	Central Bohemian Region	21	13	—	Mirošovice	I/3 E55	
Czech Republic	Central Bohemian Region	Central Bohemian Region			Rest area	Odpočívka Poddubí		
Czech Republic	Central Bohemian Region	Central Bohemian Region	29	18	—	Hvězdonice		
Czech Republic	Central Bohemian Region	Central Bohemian Region			Rest area	Odpočívka Hvězdonice		
Czech Republic	Central Bohemian Region	Central Bohemian Region			Rest area	Odpočívka Bělčice		
Czech Republic	Central Bohemian Region	Central Bohemian Region	34	21	—	Ostředek		
Czech Republic	Central Bohemian Region	Central Bohemian Region	41	25	—	Šternov		
Czech Republic	Central Bohemian Region	Central Bohemian Region			Rest area	Odpočívka Brtnice		
Czech Republic	Central Bohemian Region	Central Bohemian Region			Rest area	Odpočívka Blanice		
Czech Republic	Central Bohemian Region	Central Bohemian Region	49	30	—	Psáře		
Czech Republic	Central Bohemian Region	Central Bohemian Region			Rest area	Odpočívka Střechov		
Czech Republic	Central Bohemian Region	Central Bohemian Region	56	35	—	Soutice		
Czech Republic	Central Bohemian Region	Central Bohemian Region			Rest area	Odpočívka Kalná		
Czech Republic	Central Bohemian Region	Central Bohemian Region	66	41	—	Loket		
Czech Republic	Central Bohemian Region	Central Bohemian Region			Rest area	Odpočívka Dunice		
Czech Republic	Vysočina Region	Vysočina Region	75	47	—	Hořice		
Czech Republic	Vysočina Region	Vysočina Region	81	50	—	Koberovice		
Czech Republic	Vysočina Region	Vysočina Region			Rest area	Odpočívka Speřice		
Czech Republic	Vysočina Region	Vysočina Region			Rest area	Odpočívka Humpolec		
Czech Republic	Vysočina Region	Vysočina Region	90	56	—	Humpolec	I/34 E551	
Czech Republic	Vysočina Region	Vysočina Region			Rest area	Odpočívka Mikulášov		
Czech Republic	Vysočina Region	Vysočina Region	104	65	—	Větrný Jeníkov		
Czech Republic	Vysočina Region	Vysočina Region			Rest area	Odpočívka Pávov		
Czech Republic	Vysočina Region	Vysočina Region	112	70	—	Jihlava	I/38 E59	
Czech Republic	Vysočina Region	Vysočina Region	119	74	—	Velký Beranov		
Czech Republic	Vysočina Region	Vysočina Region			Rest area	Odpočívka Jamenský potok		
Czech Republic	Vysočina Region	Vysočina Region	134	83	—	Měřín		
Czech Republic	Vysočina Region	Vysočina Region			Rest area	Odpočívka Stránecká Zhoř		
Czech Republic	Vysočina Region	Vysočina Region			Rest area	Odpočívka Kochanov		
Czech Republic	Vysočina Region	Vysočina Region	141	88	—	Velké Meziříčí-západ		
Czech Republic	Vysočina Region	Vysočina Region			Rest area	Odpočívka Velké Meziříčí		
Czech Republic	Vysočina Region	Vysočina Region	146	91	—	Velké Meziříčí-východ		
Czech Republic	Vysočina Region	Vysočina Region	153	95	—	Lhotka		
Czech Republic	Vysočina Region	Vysočina Region	162	101	—	Velká Bíteš	I/37	
Czech Republic	South Moravian Region	South Moravian Region			Rest area	Odpočívka Devět Křížů		
Czech Republic	South Moravian Region	South Moravian Region	168	104	—	Devět Křížů		
Czech Republic	South Moravian Region	South Moravian Region	178	111	—	Ostrovačice		End of the toll section (toll coupon only, electronic toll continues to apply)
Czech Republic	South Moravian Region	South Moravian Region	182	113	—	Kývalka	I/23	
Czech Republic	South Moravian Region	South Moravian Region			Rest area	Odpočívka Popůvky		
Czech Republic	South Moravian Region	South Moravian Region			Rest area	Odpočívka Troubsko		
Czech Republic	South Moravian Region	South Moravian Region	190	120	—	Brno-západ	I/23 E461	
Czech Republic	South Moravian Region	South Moravian Region			Rest area	Odpočívka Starý Lískovec		
Czech Republic	South Moravian Region	South Moravian Region	194	121	—	Brno-centrum	I/52 E461	
Czech Republic	South Moravian Region	South Moravian Region	196	122	—	Brno-jih	D2 E65	
Czech Republic	South Moravian Region	South Moravian Region			Rest area	Odpočívka Brno-Tuřany		
Czech Republic	South Moravian Region	South Moravian Region	201	125	—	Brno-Slatina		
Czech Republic	South Moravian Region	South Moravian Region	203	126	—	Brno-východ	I/50	
Czech Republic	South Moravian Region	South Moravian Region	210	130	—	Holubice	I/50 E50	Start of toll section (toll coupon, electronic toll already in force)
Czech Republic	South Moravian Region	South Moravian Region	216	134	—	Rousinov		
Czech Republic	South Moravian Region	South Moravian Region	226	140	—	Vyškov-západ		
Czech Republic	South Moravian Region	South Moravian Region			Rest area	Odpočívka Vyškov		
Czech Republic	South Moravian Region	South Moravian Region	230	140	—	Vyškov-východ	D46 E462	
Czech Republic	South Moravian Region	South Moravian Region	236	147	—	Ivanovice na Hané		
Czech Republic	Olomouc Region	Olomouc Region	244	152	—	Mořice		
Czech Republic	Olomouc Region	Olomouc Region			Rest area	Odpočívka Křenovice		
Czech Republic	Zlin Region	Zlin Region	253	157	—	Kojetín		
Czech Republic	Zlin Region	Zlin Region	258	160	—	Kroměříž-západ	I/47	
Czech Republic	Zlin Region	Zlin Region	260	160	—	Kroměříž-východ		
Czech Republic	Zlin Region	Zlin Region	264	164	—	Hulín-západ	I/55	
Czech Republic	Zlin Region	Zlin Region	265	165	—	Hulín	D49 D55	End of the toll section (toll coupon only, electronic toll continues to apply)
Czech Republic	Olomouc Region	Olomouc Region	272	169	—	Říkovice	I/55	
Czech Republic	Olomouc Region	Olomouc Region	278	173	—	Přerov-západ		
Czech Republic	Olomouc Region	Olomouc Region	281	175	—	Přerov-sever	I/55	
Czech Republic	Olomouc Region	Olomouc Region			Rest area	Odpočívka Osek nad Bečvou		
Czech Republic	Olomouc Region	Olomouc Region	294	183	—	Lipník nad Bečvou-Trnávka		
Czech Republic	Olomouc Region	Olomouc Region	296	184	—	Lipník nad Bečvou-Bohuslávky	D35 E442 E462	
Czech Republic	Olomouc Region	Olomouc Region	298	185	—	Lipník nad Bečvou-Loučka	I/35 E442 E462	Start of toll section (toll coupon, electronic toll already in force)
Czech Republic	Olomouc Region	Olomouc Region	308	191	—	Hranice		
Czech Republic	Olomouc Region	Olomouc Region	311	193	—	Bělotín	D48 E462	
Czech Republic	Moravian-Silesian Region	Moravian-Silesian Region			Rest area	Odpočívka Vražné		
Czech Republic	Moravian-Silesian Region	Moravian-Silesian Region	321	199	—	Mankovice		
Czech Republic	Moravian-Silesian Region	Moravian-Silesian Region	330	210	—	Hladké Životice		
Czech Republic	Moravian-Silesian Region	Moravian-Silesian Region	336	209	—	Butovice		
Czech Republic	Moravian-Silesian Region	Moravian-Silesian Region	342	213	—	Bravantice		
Czech Republic	Moravian-Silesian Region	Moravian-Silesian Region			Rest area	Odpočívka Klimkovice		
Czech Republic	Moravian-Silesian Region	Moravian-Silesian Region	349	217	—	Klimkovice		
Czech Republic	Moravian-Silesian Region	Moravian-Silesian Region	354	220	—	Rudna		
Czech Republic	Moravian-Silesian Region	Moravian-Silesian Region	357	222	—	Severní spoj		
Czech Republic	Moravian-Silesian Region	Moravian-Silesian Region	361	224	—	Místecká	I/56	
Czech Republic	Moravian-Silesian Region	Moravian-Silesian Region	365	227	—	Vrbice		
Czech Republic	Moravian-Silesian Region	Moravian-Silesian Region	366	227	—	Vrbice		
Czech Republic	Moravian-Silesian Region	Moravian-Silesian Region	370	230	—	Bohumín	I/67	
Czech Republic	Moravian-Silesian Region	Moravian-Silesian Region	372	231	—	Bohumín	I/67	End of toll section (end of electronic tolling)
Czech Republic	Moravian-Silesian Region	Moravian-Silesian Region	376	234	Czech Republic–Poland border	Věřňovice/Gorzyczki border crossing	A 1	Kilometrage end point Border with Poland; road continues as the Polish A1
1.000 mi = 1.609 km; 1.000 km = 0.621 mi: Route transition; Unopened

== Highway elevation ==
- Maximum: 655 meters above sea level (km 104)
- Minimum: 197 meters above sea level (km 370)

== Gallery ==
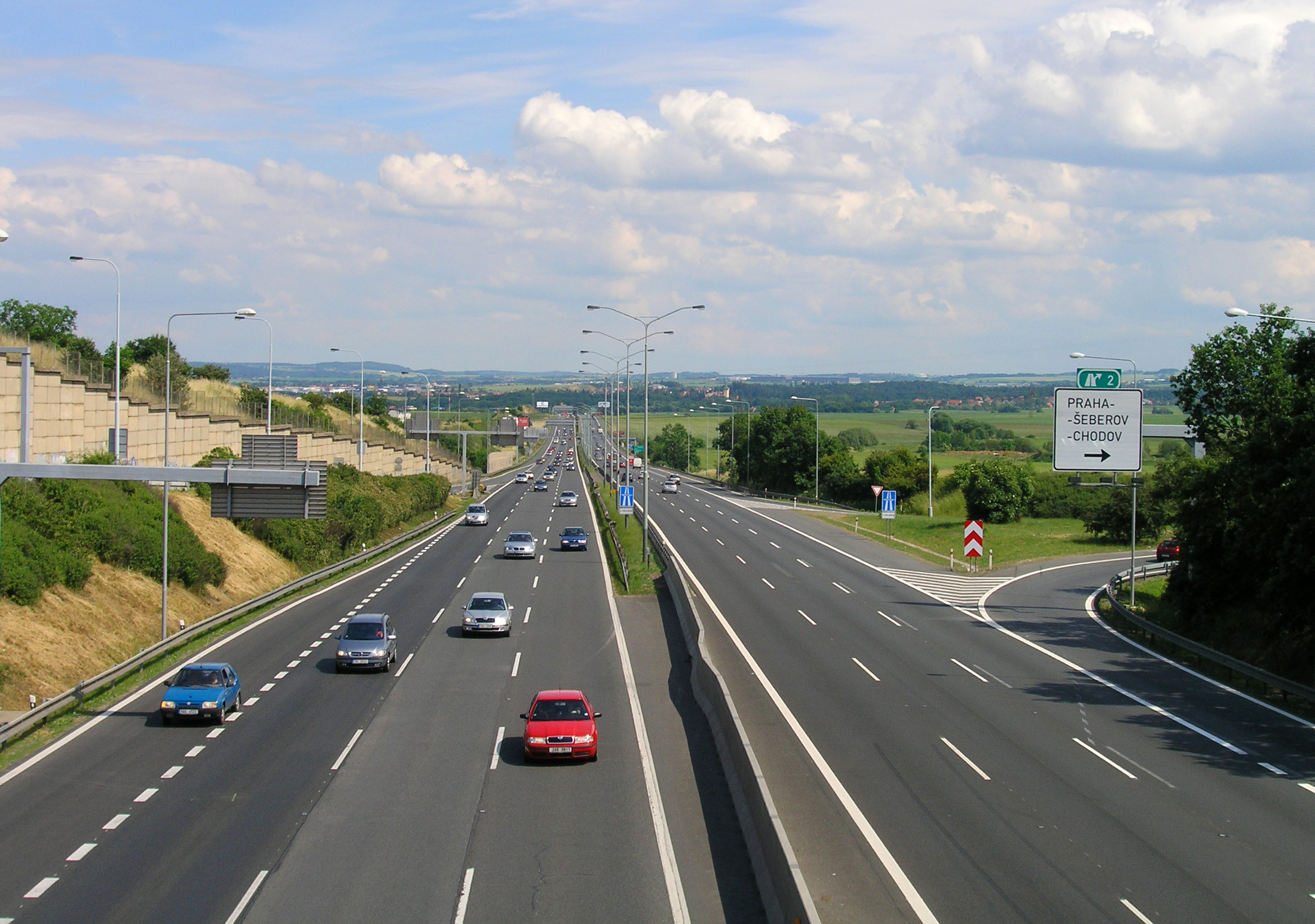
motorway D1 in Prague

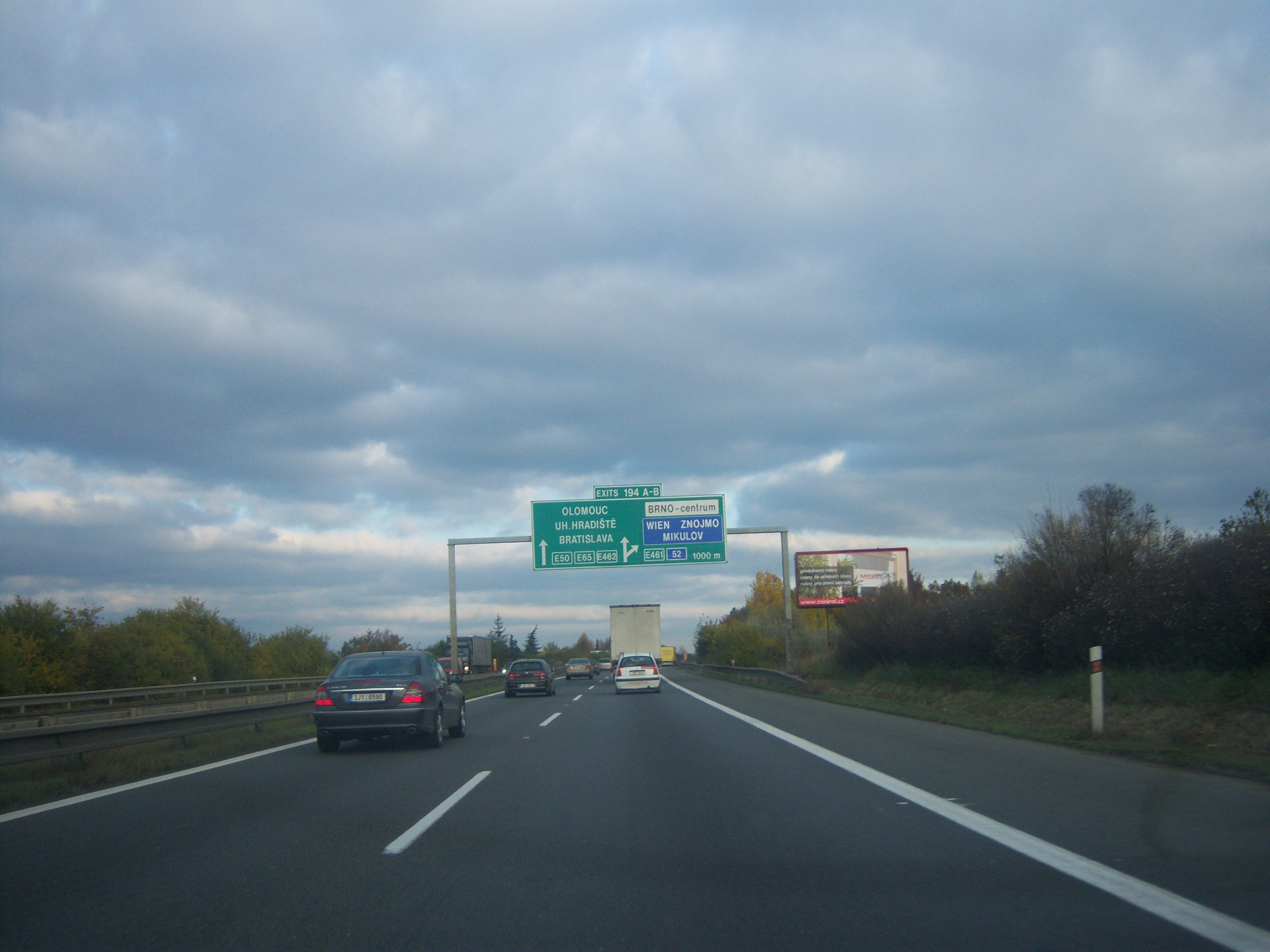
D1 near Brno

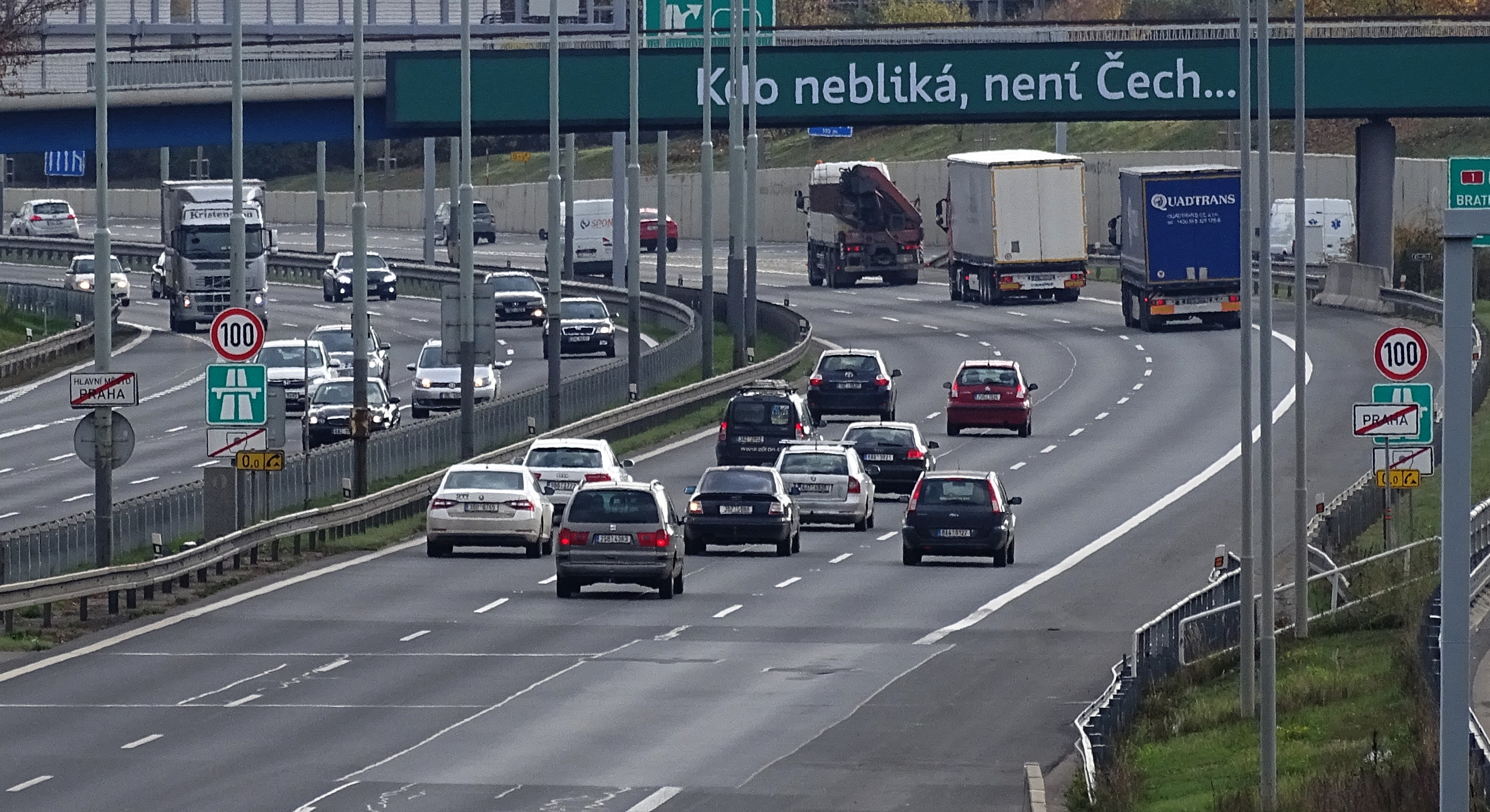
Motorway D1 in Prague-Chodov

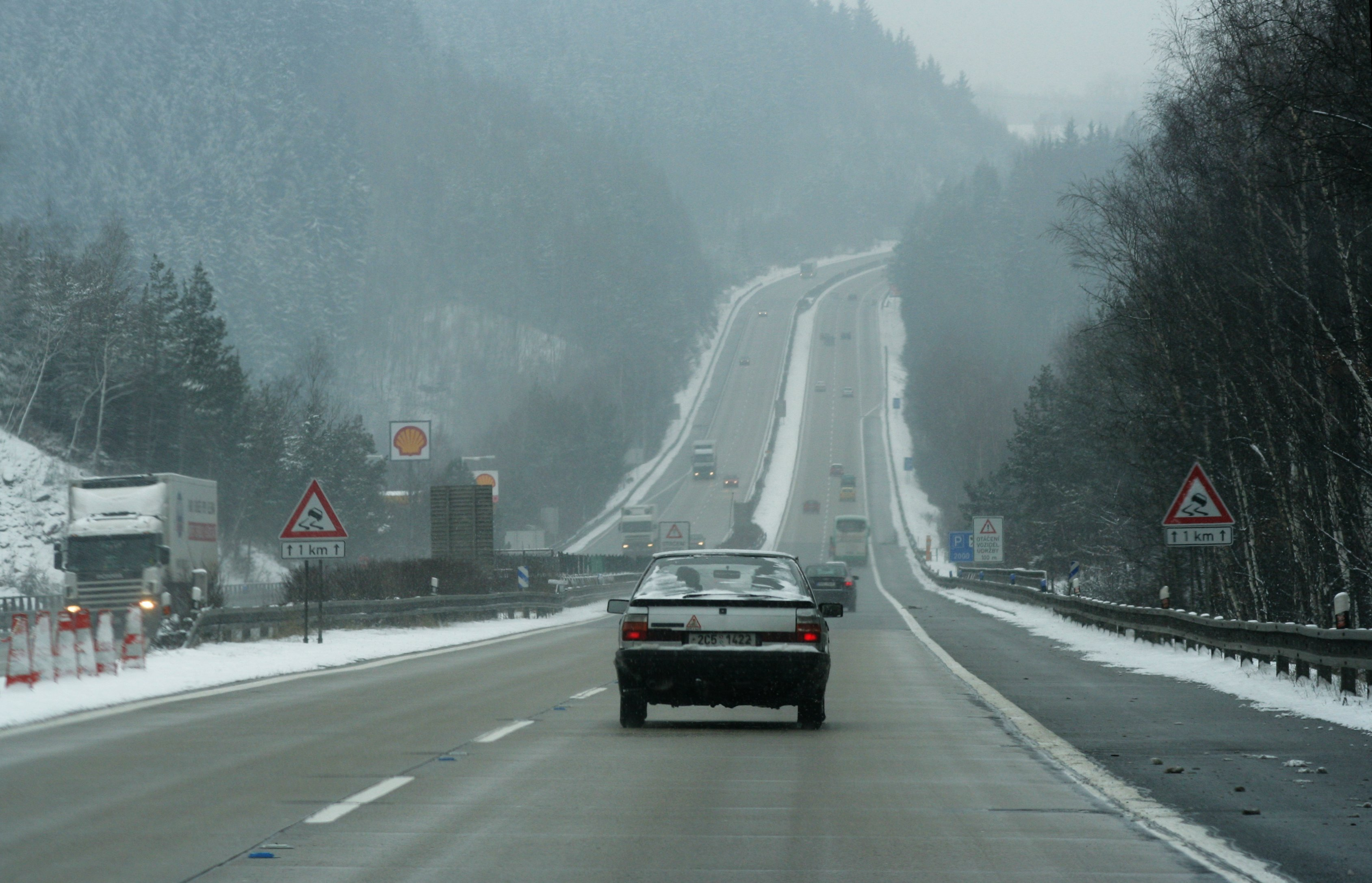
D1 somewhere in Vysočina Region

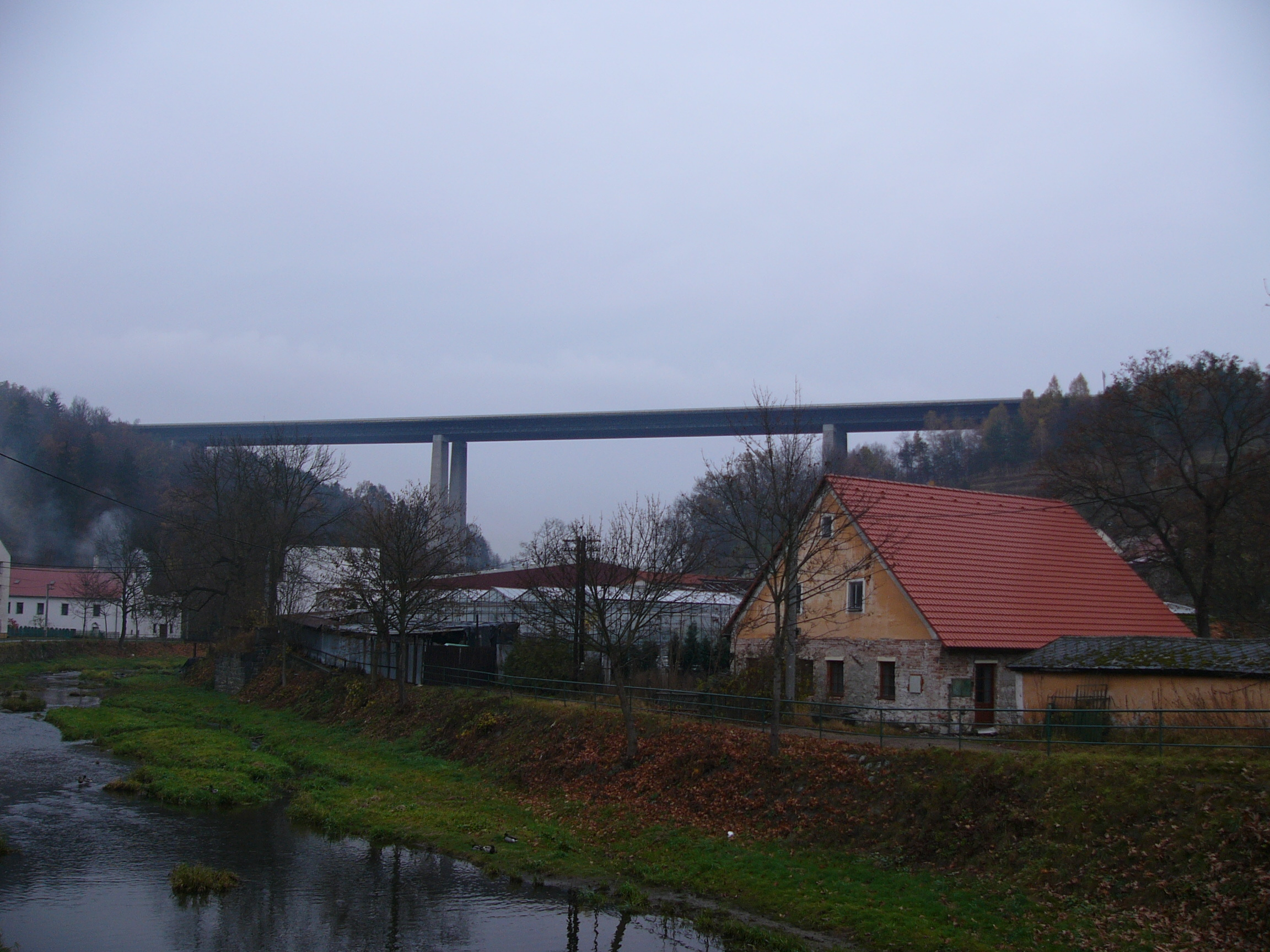
Vysočina highway bridge on km 144, 60 km from Brno
