= Opatovec =

- Municipality
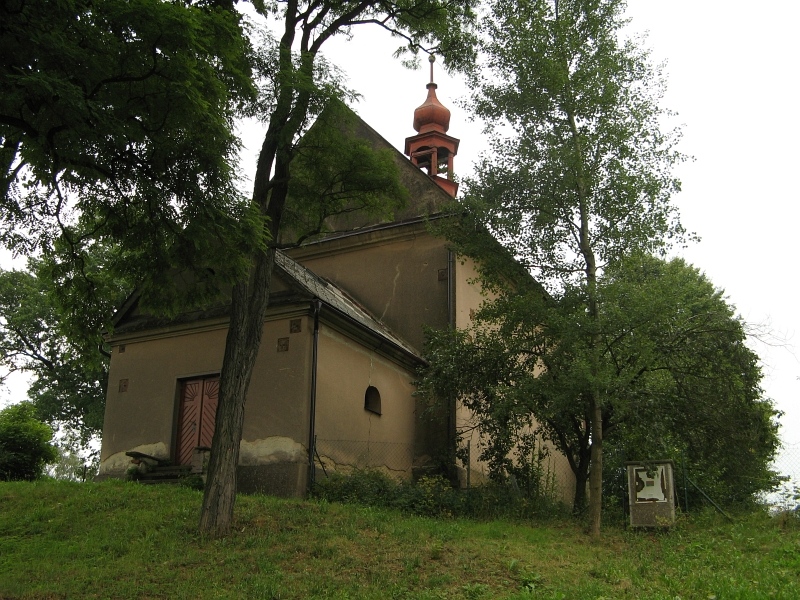
- Chapel of Saint Wenceslaus

- Flag Coat of arms

- Location in the Czech Republic
- Coordinates: 49°48′19″N 16°28′49″E
- Country: Czech Republic
- Region: Pardubice
- District: Svitavy
- First mentioned: 1347

Area
  - Total: 7.08 km^{2} (2.73 sq mi)
- Elevation: 438 m (1,437 ft)

Population (2026-01-01)
  - Total: 727
  - Density: 103/km^{2} (266/sq mi)
- Time zone: UTC+1 (CET)
  - Summer (DST): UTC+2 (CEST)
- Postal code: 568 02
- Website: www.opatovec.cz

Opatovec (German: Überdörfel) is a municipality and village in Svitavy District in the Pardubice Region of the Czech Republic. It has about 700 inhabitants.

== Etymology ==
The name Opatovec is a diminutive of Opatov, which is the neighbouring village. The names of both of these villages were derived from the word opat (i.e. 'abbot'), which refers to the fact that they were initially a property of the monastery in Litomyšl.

== Geography ==
Opatovec is located about 5 kilometres (3 mi) north of Svitavy and 56 km (35 mi) southeast of Pardubice. It lies in the Svitavy Uplands. The highest point is the hill Na Rozcestí at 465 m (1,526 ft) above sea level. There are two major fishponds in the municipality, Sychrovec and Pařez, supplied by the stream Mikulečský potok.

== History ==
The first written mention of Opatov is from 1347. Opatovec was first distinguished from Opatov in a document from 1547. Both the villages belonged to the Litomyšl estate and shared its owners. In 1697, the municipality of Opatovec was created by merger of Opatovec with the hamlets of Košíře and Český Lačnov.

After World War II, the German-speaking inhabitants were expelled.

In 1950, the hamlets of Nový Valdek and Starý Valdek were annexed to the municipality and formed its municipal parts. In 1971, Košíře, Český Lačnov, Nový Valdek, Starý Valdek became integral parts of Opatovec. Between 1976 and 1990, Opatovec was a municipal part of Svitavy. Since 1990, it has been a separate municipality again.

== Demographics ==
Historical population

Year	Pop.	±%
1869	1,448	—
1880	1,313	−9.3%
1890	1,414	+7.7%
1900	1,379	−2.5%
1910	1,285	−6.8%

Year	Pop.	±%
1921	1,130	−12.1%
1930	1,095	−3.1%
1950	675	−38.4%
1961	680	+0.7%
1970	653	−4.0%

Year	Pop.	±%
1980	694	+6.3%
1991	624	−10.1%
2001	585	−6.2%
2011	639	+9.2%
2021	694	+8.6%

Source: Censuses

== Transport ==
Two first class roads passes through the municipality: the I/35 road (part of the European route E442, which replaces the unfinished section of the D35 motorway from Olomouc to the Hradec Králové Region, and the I/43 road from Svitavy to the Czech–Polish border.

Opatovec is located on the railway line heading from Česká Třebová to Svitavy and Letovice.

== Sights ==
The main landmark of Opatovec is the Chapel of Saint Wenceslaus. It was built in the Baroque style in 1850. In the area of Košíře is the Church of the Nativity of the Virgin Mary from 1793.
