= D43 =

D43 may refer to:

- D43 motorway (Czech Republic)
- D43 road (Croatia)
- HMS Coventry (D43), a C-class light cruiser of the Royal Navy
- HMS Matapan (D43), a Battle-class fleet destroyer of the Royal Navy
- HMS New Zealand (D43), a cancelled Malta-class aircraft carrier ordered for the Royal Navy
- HMS Wessex (D43), a W-class destroyer of the Royal Navy
- Semi-Slav Defense, a chess opening
