= D43 motorway (Czech Republic) =

Formerly planned Czech motorway

D43 Motorway
- Dálnice D43

Route information
- Existed: 1987–2021
- History: Was R43 from 1987 to 2016; redesignated as first class road I/73 in 2021

Major junctions
- South end: D 1 in Brno
- North end: D 35 near Moravská Třebová

Location
- Country: Czech Republic
- Regions: South Moravian, Pardubice
- Major cities: Brno, Moravská Třebová

Highway system
- Highways in the Czech Republic
← D 35	→ D 46

D43 motorway (Czech: Dálnice D43), formerly Expressway R43 (Czech: Rychlostní silnice R43) is a highway in the Czech Republic. If completed, it will connect cities Brno and Moravská Třebová, and the D1 motorway with the D35 motorway.

First project in that route was created after Munich Agreement by Nazi Germany, as an ex-territorial Autobahn A88 Breslau - Wien, passing through territory of The Second Republic of Czechoslovakia with custom houses on all exits. Construction began in April 1939, during German occupation of Czechoslovakia and was halted on 73 km of route in April 1942 due to the increasing demands of World War II. After war construction was not resumed, whole route was abandoned.

In 1980s a modern plan for R43 was set up and first 7 km long segment from Brno to north was built. In 1990s plans of southern section with route straight through town centre of Brno were abandoned and other alternatives are considered, some of them using line of German autobahn. Existing segment of R43 is used as feeder only in some alternatives. Plans for northern part are using main part of German autobahn.

In 2021, the D43 motorway was dropped from the highway network altogether and redesignated as first class road I/73.

== Images ==
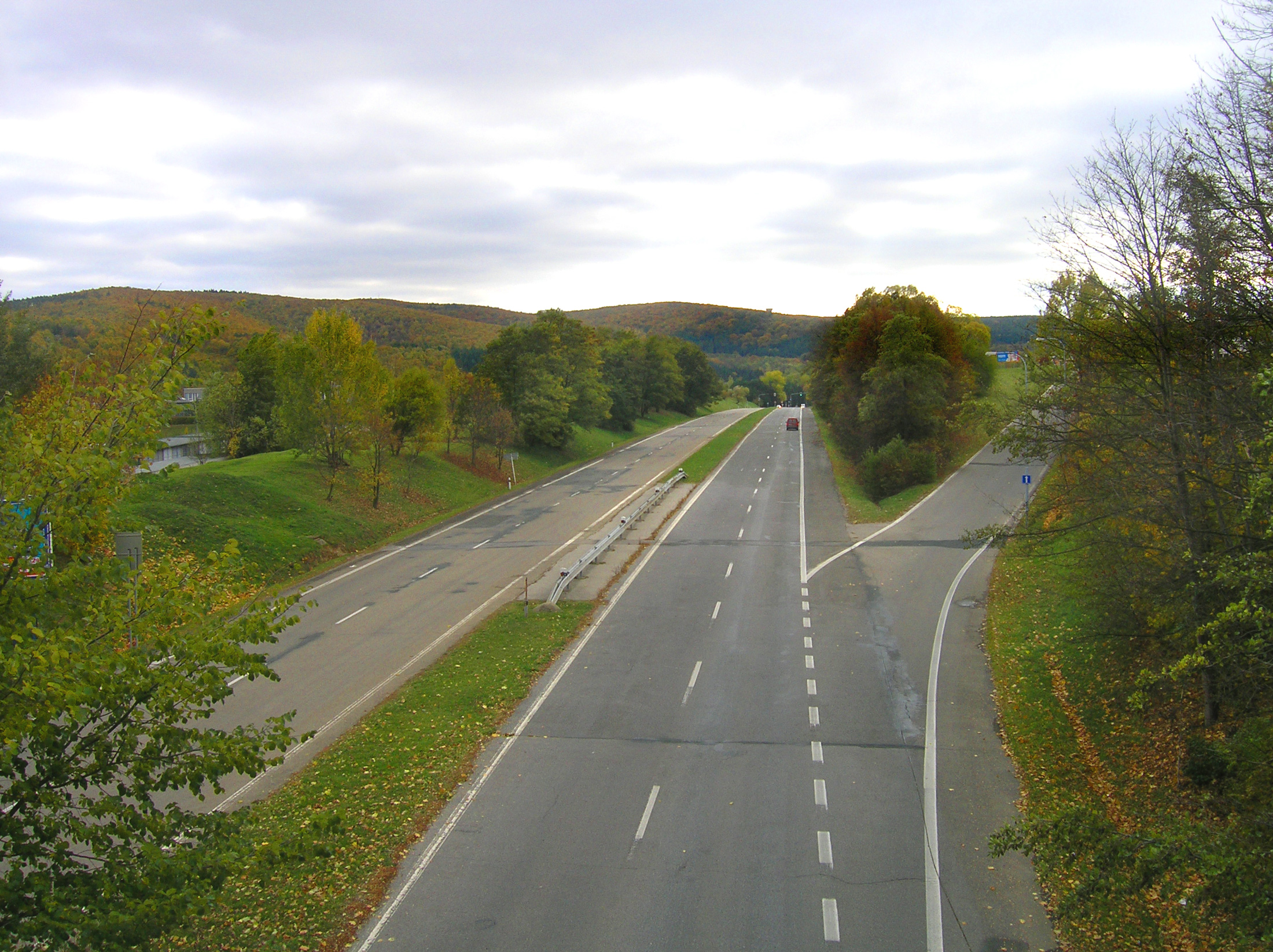

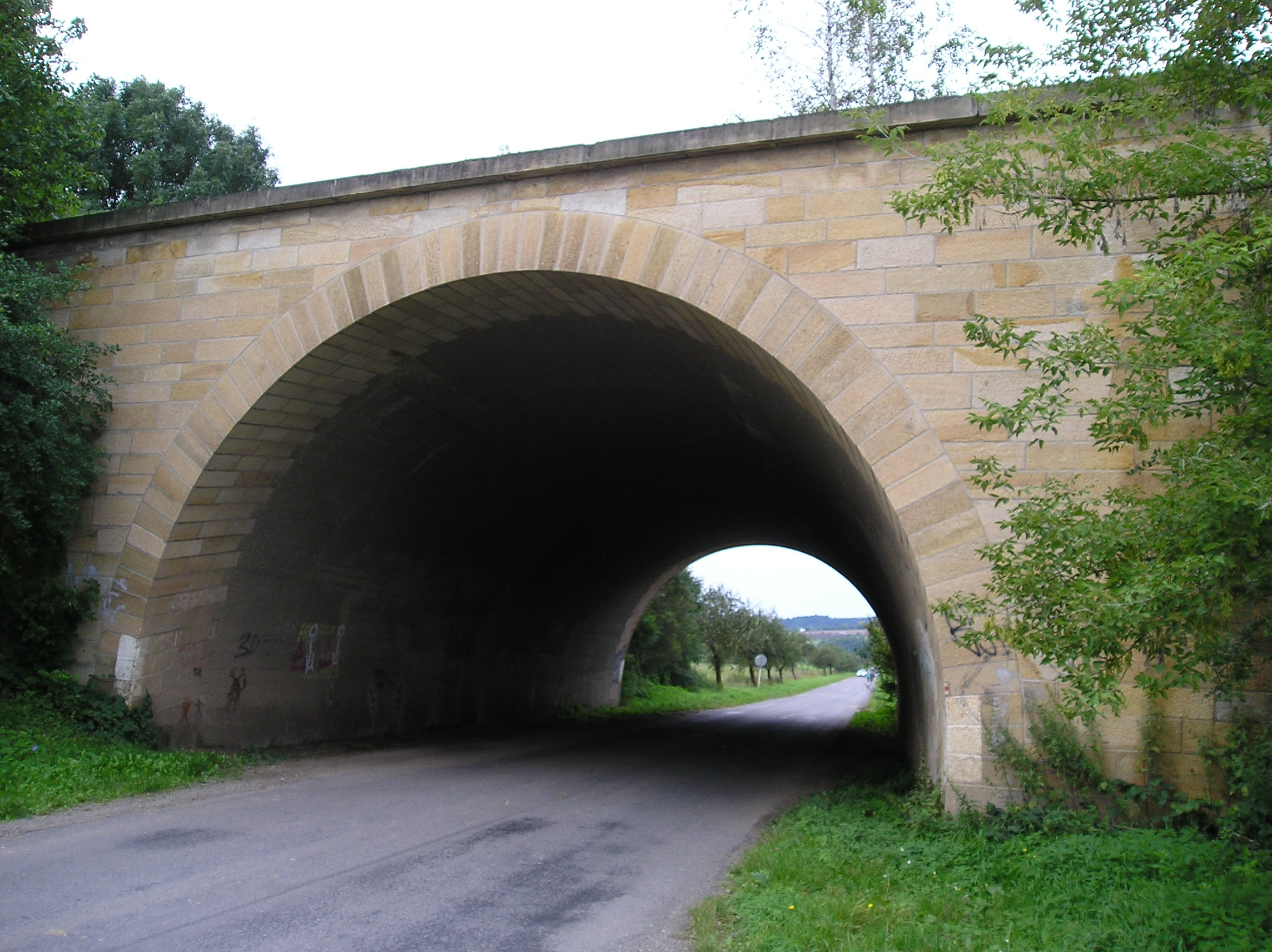
