= European route E462 =

Road in trans-European E-road network

E462

Route information
- Length: 323 km (201 mi)

Major junctions
- From: Brno (Czech Republic)
- Olomouc, Český Těšín, Katowice
- To: Kraków (Poland)

Location
- Countries: Czech Republic; Poland

Highway system
- International E-road network; A Class; B Class

E 462 is a European B class road in Czech Republic and Poland, connecting the cities Brno – Olomouc – Český Těšín - Katowice – Kraków

== Route ==
- Czech Republic
  - D 1: Brno – Vyškov (E50/E65 concurrency)
  - D 46: Vyškov – Olomouc
  - D 35: Olomouc – Lipník nad Bečvou
  - D 1: Lipník nad Bečvou – Bělotín
  - D 48: Bělotín bypass
  - I/48: Bělotín – Nový Jičín
  - D 48: Nový Jičín – Český Těšín (beginning of E75 concurrency)
  - I/48: Český Těšín – Polish border
- Poland
  - S 52: Cieszyn, Czech border – Bielsko-Biała
  - DK 1: Bielsko-Biała – Tychy
  - S 1: Tychy – Mysłowice
  - A 4: Mysłowice – Kraków (end of E75 concurrency)
