= Janov (Svitavy District) =

- Municipality
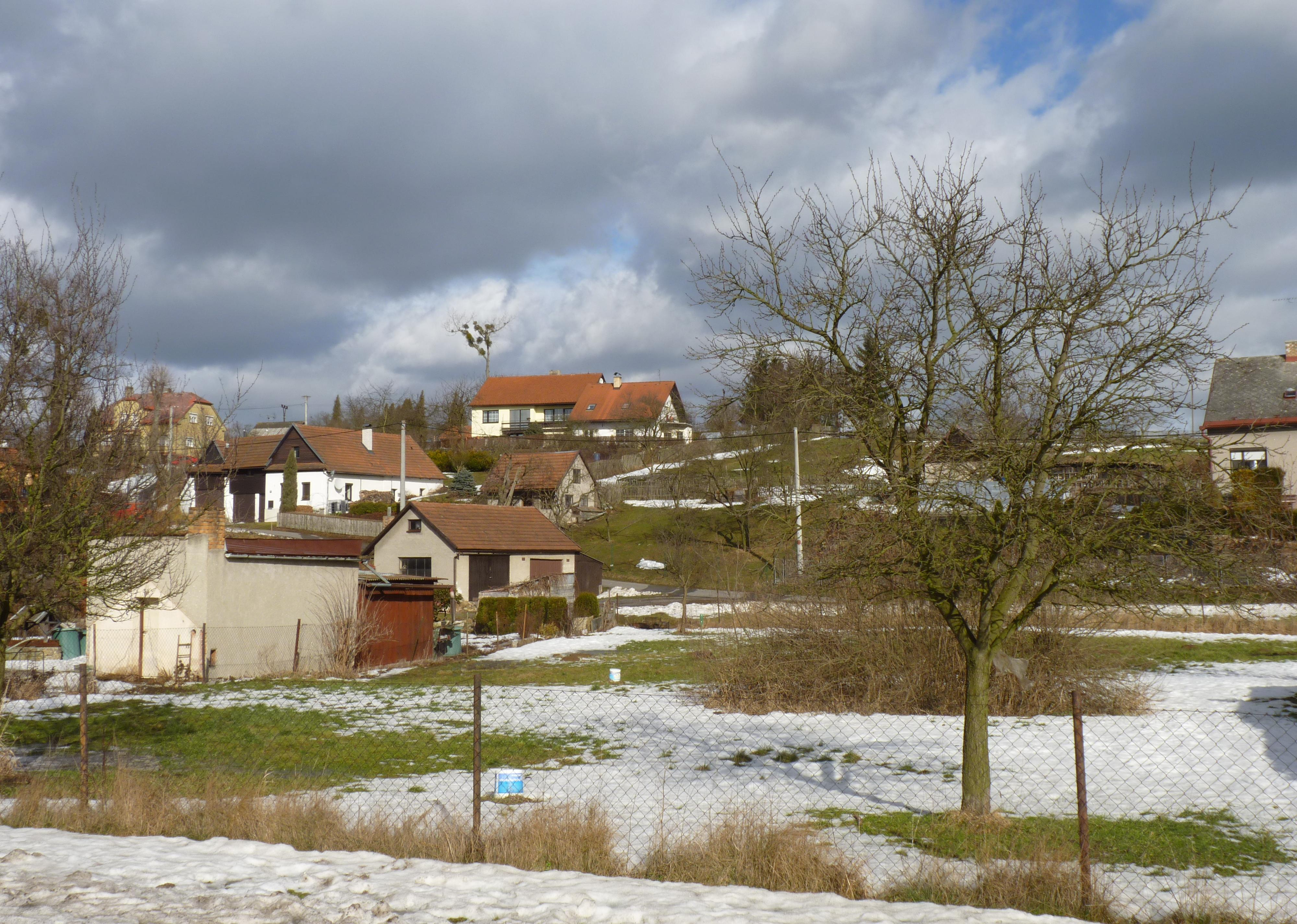
- Houses in Janov

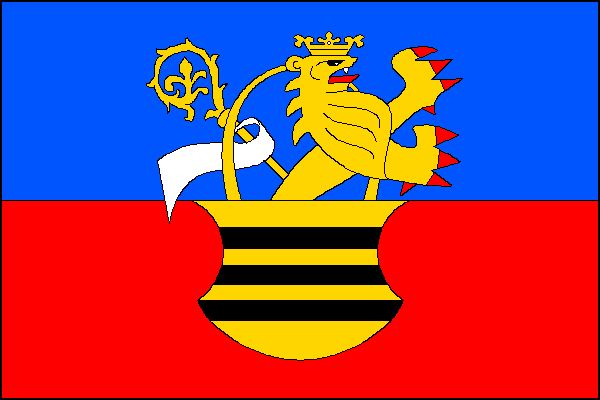
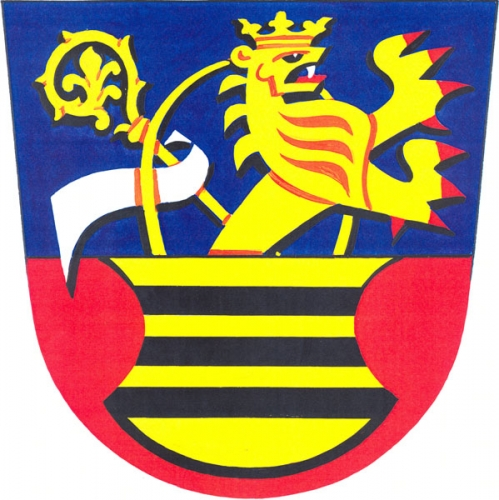
- Flag Coat of arms

- Location in the Czech Republic
- Coordinates: 49°50′27″N 16°23′7″E
- Country: Czech Republic
- Region: Pardubice
- District: Svitavy
- First mentioned: 1347

Area
  - Total: 24.70 km^{2} (9.54 sq mi)
- Elevation: 465 m (1,526 ft)

Population (2026-01-01)
  - Total: 1,041
  - Density: 42.15/km^{2} (109.2/sq mi)
- Time zone: UTC+1 (CET)
  - Summer (DST): UTC+2 (CEST)
- Postal codes: 569 55, 570 01
- Website: www.janov-sy.cz

Janov is a municipality and village in Svitavy District in the Pardubice Region of the Czech Republic. It has about 1,000 inhabitants.

Janov lies approximately 12 kilometres (7 mi) north-west of Svitavy, 49 km (30 mi) south-east of Pardubice, and 144 km (89 mi) east of Prague.

== Administrative division ==
Janov consists of three municipal parts (in brackets population according to the 2021 census):

- Janov (859)
- Gajer (47)
- Mendryka (61)

== Demographics ==
Historical population
Year	Pop.	±%
1869	2,278	—
1880	2,180	−4.3%
1890	2,190	+0.5%
1900	2,179	−0.5%
1910	2,181	+0.1%
1921	1,883	−13.7%
1930	1,839	−2.3%
1950	890	−51.6%
1961	802	−9.9%
1970	736	−8.2%
1980	799	+8.6%
1991	758	−5.1%
2001	745	−1.7%
2011	957	+28.5%
2021	967	+1.0%
Source: Censuses
