= Lužná (Vsetín District) =

- Municipality
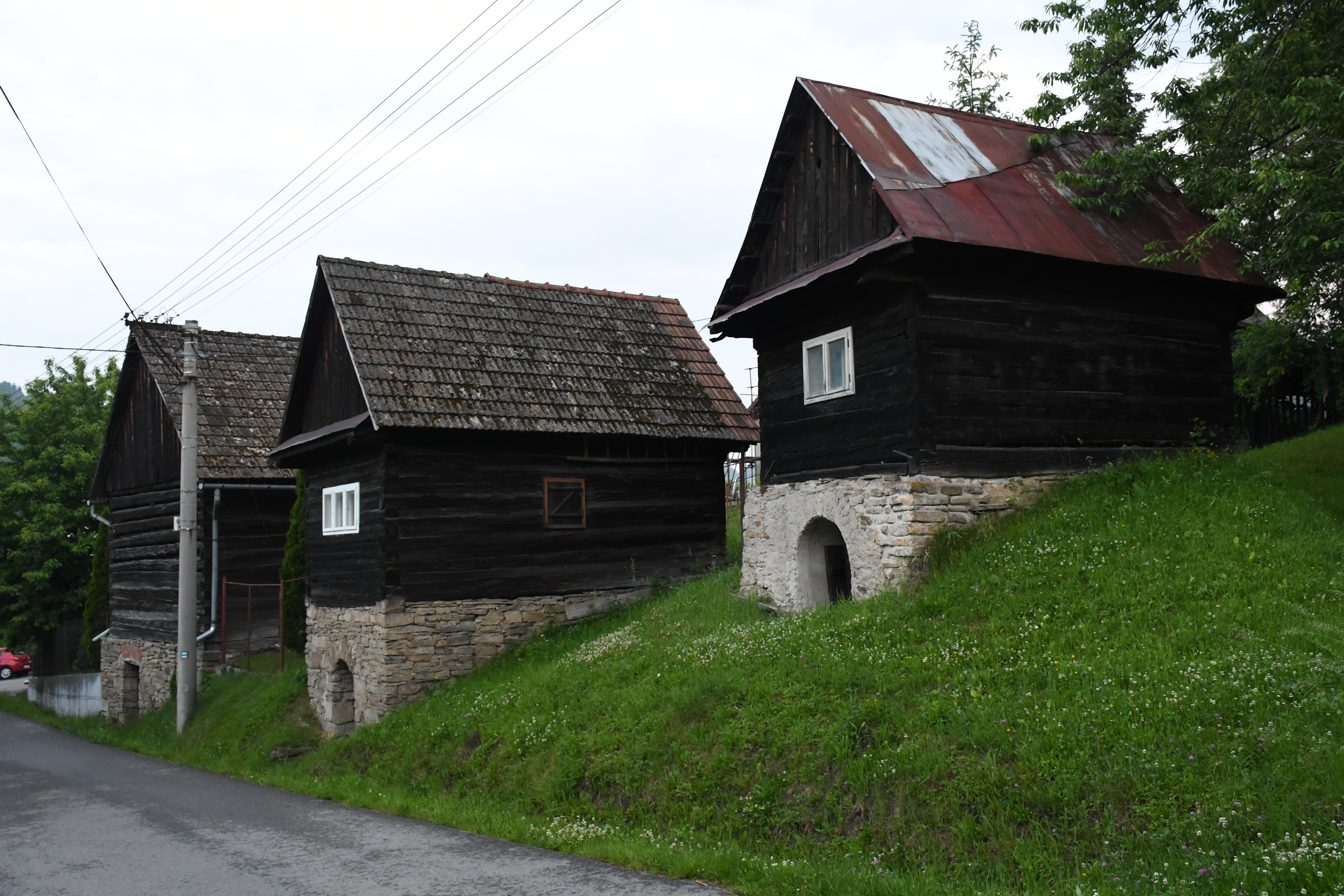
- Wine cellars

- Flag Coat of arms

- Location in the Czech Republic
- Coordinates: 49°14′23″N 18°1′11″E
- Country: Czech Republic
- Region: Zlín
- District: Vsetín
- First mentioned: 1512

Area
  - Total: 15.69 km^{2} (6.06 sq mi)
- Elevation: 440 m (1,440 ft)

Population (2026-01-01)
  - Total: 615
  - Density: 39.2/km^{2} (102/sq mi)
- Time zone: UTC+1 (CET)
  - Summer (DST): UTC+2 (CEST)
- Postal code: 756 11
- Website: www.obec-luzna.cz

Lužná is a municipality and village in Vsetín District in the Zlín Region of the Czech Republic. It has about 600 inhabitants.

Lužná lies approximately 12 kilometres (7 mi) south of Vsetín, 26 km (16 mi) east of Zlín, and 276 km (171 mi) east of Prague.

== Demographics ==
Historical population
Year	Pop.	±%
1869	791	—
1880	825	+4.3%
1890	828	+0.4%
1900	871	+5.2%
1910	856	−1.7%
1921	852	−0.5%
1930	899	+5.5%
1950	828	−7.9%
1961	908	+9.7%
1970	832	−8.4%
1980	694	−16.6%
1991	552	−20.5%
2001	554	+0.4%
2011	556	+0.4%
2021	580	+4.3%
Source: Censuses
