= Džbánov =

- Municipality
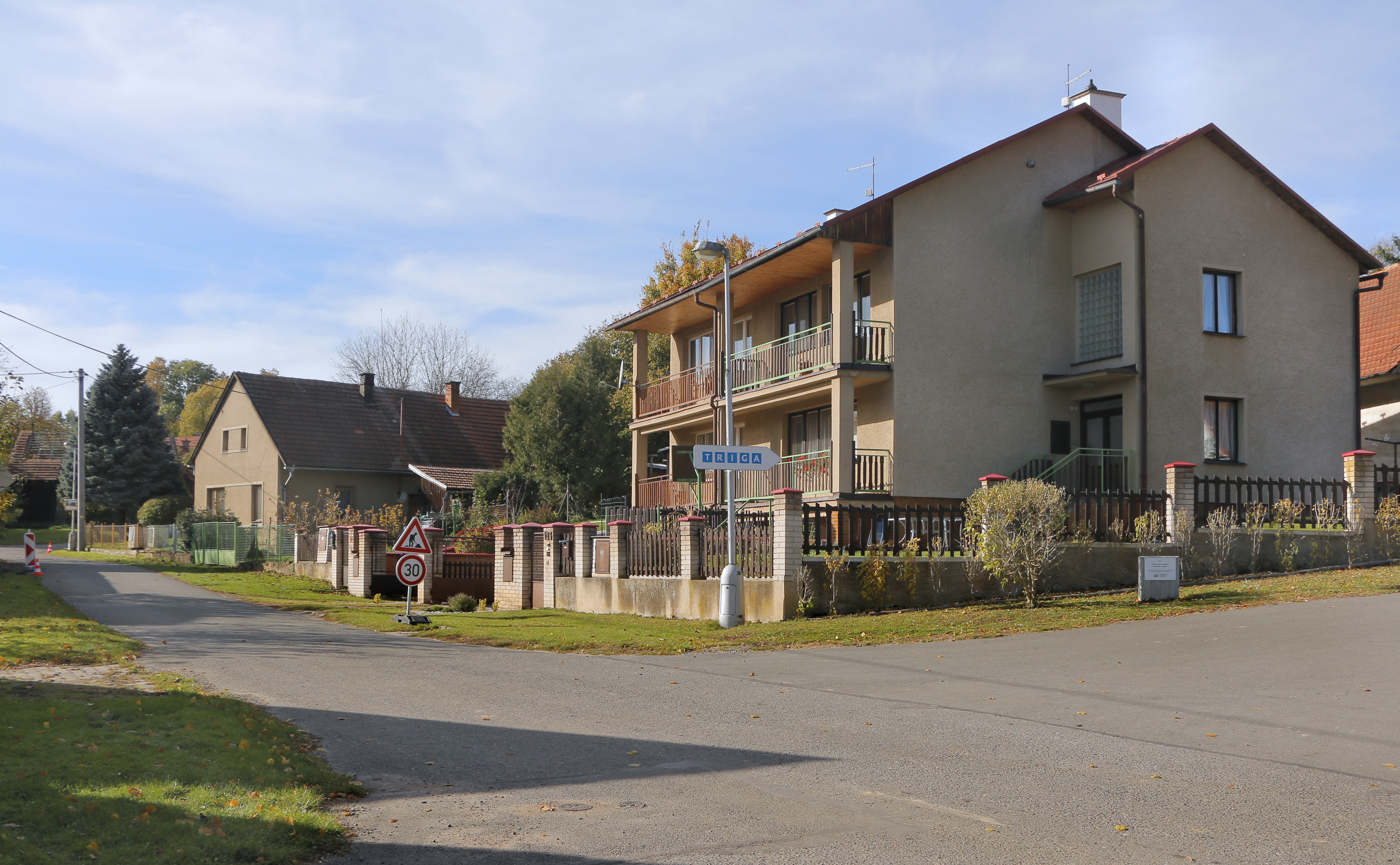
- Centre of Džbánov

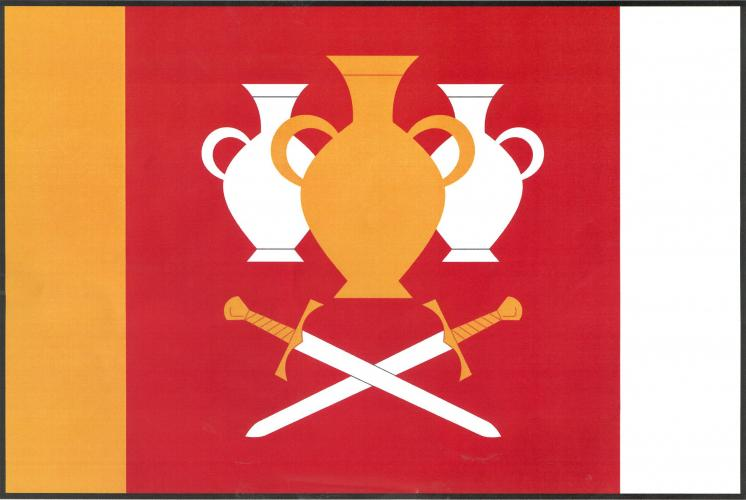
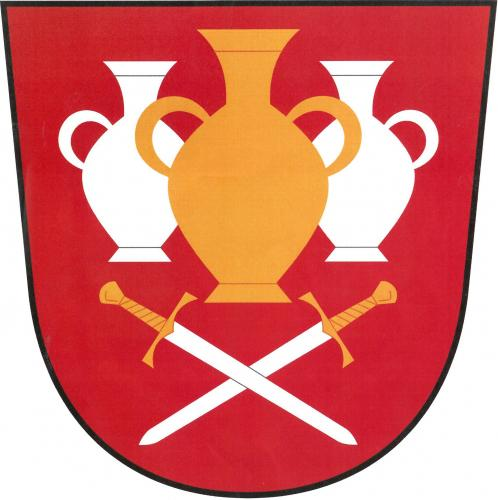
- Flag Coat of arms

- Location in the Czech Republic
- Coordinates: 49°54′59″N 16°9′34″E
- Country: Czech Republic
- Region: Pardubice
- District: Ústí nad Orlicí
- First mentioned: 1292

Area
  - Total: 6.59 km^{2} (2.54 sq mi)
- Elevation: 294 m (965 ft)

Population (2026-01-01)
  - Total: 377
  - Density: 57.2/km^{2} (148/sq mi)
- Time zone: UTC+1 (CET)
  - Summer (DST): UTC+2 (CEST)
- Postal code: 566 01
- Website: www.dzbanov.cz

Džbánov is a municipality and village in Ústí nad Orlicí District in the Pardubice Region of the Czech Republic. It has about 400 inhabitants.

== Etymology ==
The similarity with the Czech word džbán (i.e. 'jug') is only coincidental. The name of the village probably originates in the personal name Čban that belonged to one of the first reeves or settlers. The village was initially called Čbánov, which evolved to Džbánov.

== Geography ==
Džbánov is located about 28 kilometres (17 mi) southeast of Pardubice. It lies in the Svitavy Uplands. The highest point is at 404 m (1,325 ft) above sea level.

== History ==
Džbánov was founded in the mid-13th century. The first written mention of Džbánov is from 1292. In the 14th century, it was property of the Zbraslav Monastery. After the Hussite Wars, the village property was split between several placeholders (the emperor, the town of Vysoké Mýto, royal chamber, and the noble family of Kostka of Postupice). The town of Vysoké Mýto owned the whole village from the late 16th century to 1850. Afterwards the village became autonomous municipality.

== Demographics ==
Historical population

Year	Pop.	±%
1869	571	—
1880	576	+0.9%
1890	589	+2.3%
1900	587	−0.3%
1910	578	−1.5%

Year	Pop.	±%
1921	572	−1.0%
1930	532	−7.0%
1950	441	−17.1%
1961	425	−3.6%
1970	394	−7.3%

Year	Pop.	±%
1980	365	−7.4%
1991	363	−0.5%
2001	303	−16.5%
2011	333	+9.9%
2021	364	+9.3%

Source: Censuses

== Transport ==
Džbánov is located on the railway line Litomyšl–Choceň.

== Sights ==
The only protected cultural monument in the municipality is the rural homestead No. 17 from the early 19th century.
