= Úlibice =

- Municipality
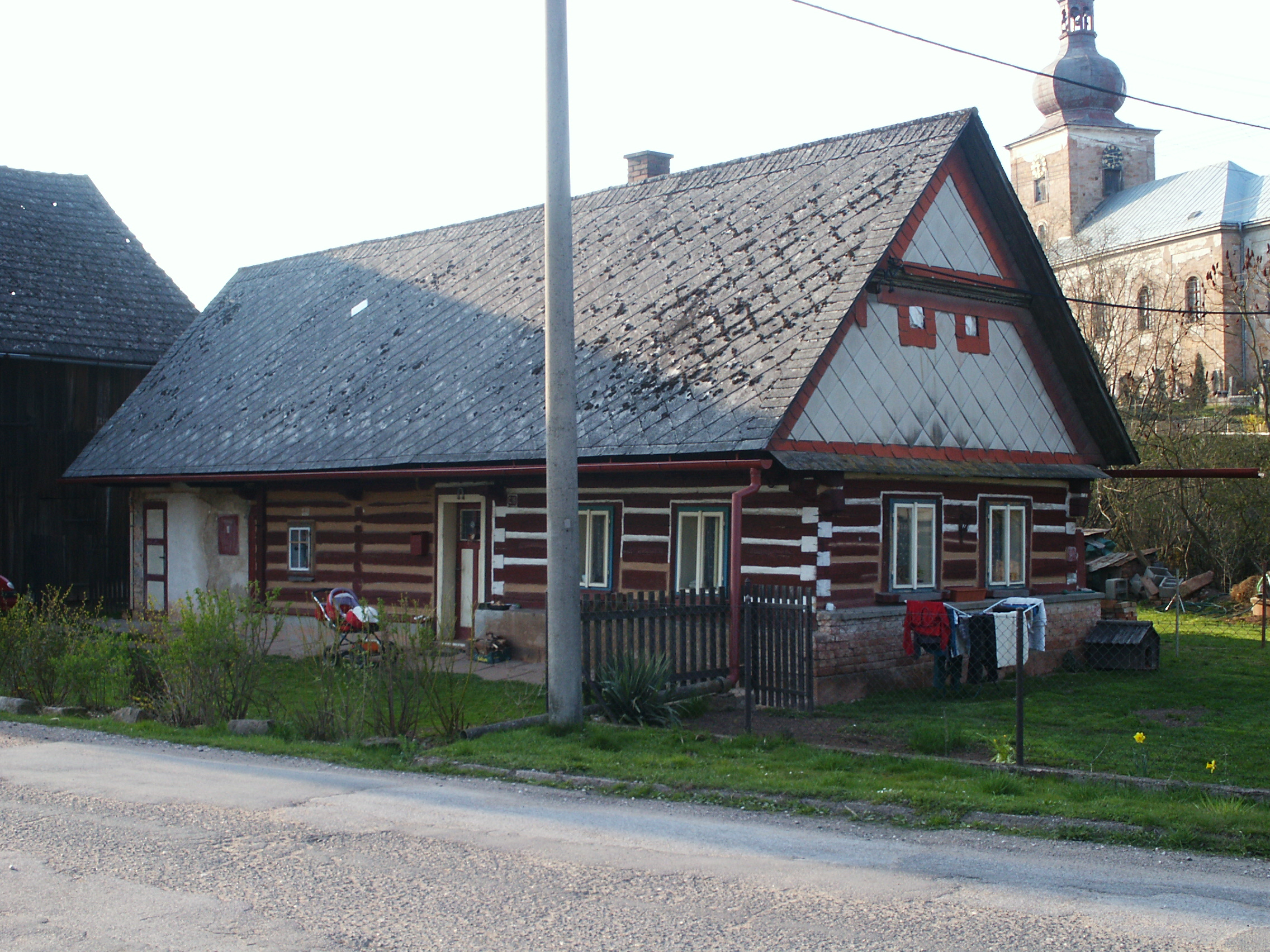
- Log house and Church of the Annunciation

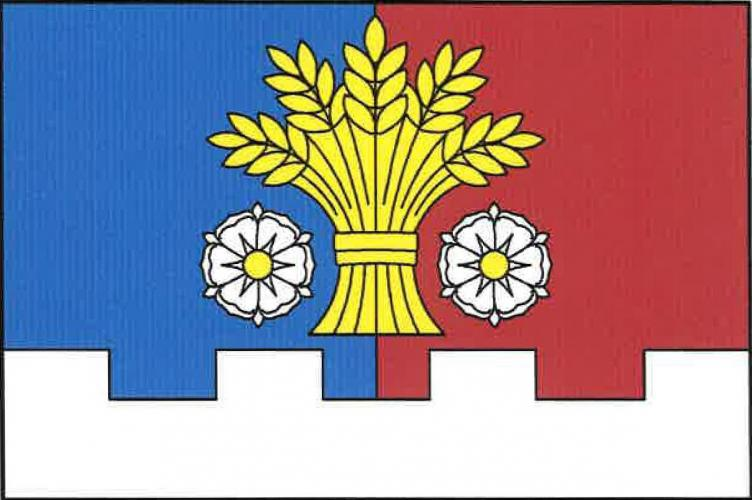
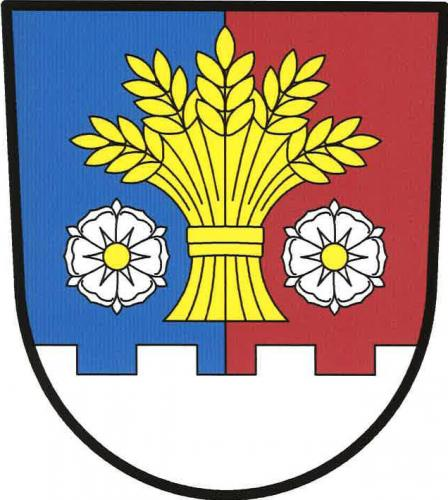
- Flag Coat of arms

- Location in the Czech Republic
- Coordinates: 50°26′3″N 15°26′15″E
- Country: Czech Republic
- Region: Hradec Králové
- District: Jičín
- First mentioned: 1355

Area
  - Total: 6.75 km^{2} (2.61 sq mi)
- Elevation: 286 m (938 ft)

Population (2026-01-01)
  - Total: 366
  - Density: 54.2/km^{2} (140/sq mi)
- Time zone: UTC+1 (CET)
  - Summer (DST): UTC+2 (CEST)
- Postal codes: 506 01, 507 07
- Website: www.ulibice.cz

Úlibice is a municipality and village in Jičín District in the Hradec Králové Region of the Czech Republic. It has about 400 inhabitants.

== Administrative division ==
Úlibice consists of two municipal parts (in brackets population according to the 2021 census):

- Úlibice (280)
- Řeheč (37)

== Demographics ==
Historical population
Year	Pop.	±%
1869	632	—
1880	625	−1.1%
1890	655	+4.8%
1900	558	−14.8%
1910	516	−7.5%
1921	484	−6.2%
1930	453	−6.4%
1950	316	−30.2%
1961	303	−4.1%
1970	286	−5.6%
1980	258	−9.8%
1991	230	−10.9%
2001	238	+3.5%
2011	260	+9.2%
2021	317	+21.9%
Source: Censuses
