= European route E442 =

Road in the Czech Republic and Slovakia

E442

Route information
- Length: 607 km (377 mi)

Major junctions
- From: Karlovy Vary
- Teplice; Turnov; Hradec Králové; Olomouc
- To: Žilina

Location
- Countries: Czech Republic; Slovakia

Highway system
- International E-road network; A Class; B Class

European route E 442 is part of the international E-road network.

== Route ==
- Czech Republic
  - E48, E49 Karlovy Vary
  - E55 Teplice
  - E65 Turnov
  - E67 Hradec Králové
  - E462 Olomouc
- Slovakia
  - E50, E75 Žilina
