= Vitus Grummann =

German lichenologist and teacher (1899–1967)

Vitus Johannes Grummann
- Born: 3 March 1899; Jacobsdorf, Silesia
- Died: 12 December 1967 (aged 68)
- Education: Friedrich-Wilhelm University
- Scientific career
- Fields: Lichenology
- Workplaces: Reich Institute for Film and Picture in Science and Education
- Author abbrev. (botany): Grummann

Vitus Johannes Grummann (3 March 1899 – 12 December 1967, Berlin) was a German lichenologist and primary school teacher. Born in Jacobsdorf, Silesia, Grummann began his career in education and served as a primary school teacher in the Berlin area for many years. His professional path took a turn when he started studying natural sciences at Friedrich-Wilhelm University, developing a fascination with botany, especially lichens. He earned his doctorate in 1939, producing a dissertation on morphological deviations in lichens. After World War II, Grummann headed a department at the Reich Institute for Film and Picture in Science and Education and simultaneously taught at Berlin high schools. His academic career was distinguished by 18 publications on various floristic projects and the creation of a comprehensive biographical-bibliographical handbook of lichenologists worldwide. Grummann also took an active interest in the works of Silesian artists and authors. Several lichen species were named in his honour in recognition of his contributions.

== Early life and career ==
Grummann was born on 3 March 1899 in Jacobsdorf, Silesia, close to the Polish border. He pursued a career in education, attending a teachers' college in Bad Ziegenhals (now Głuchołazy) from 1913 to 1920, which was interrupted by the conscription from 1917 to 1919. In the military, he first served in infantry, and later in border protection. In 1920 he became a primary school teacher, serving in the Berlin area for many years, until 1942. In this time he passed the special education teacher examination and completed his matriculation at the Ministry of Education in Berlin in 1937. However, his professional trajectory took a turn in the late 1930s, after he began studying natural sciences (specific and general botany, geology with paleontology, and zoology) at the Friedrich-Wilhelm University (now the Humboldt University of Berlin) in Berlin. His dedication to academia culminated in his earning a doctorate degree in 1939. From August 1939 until June 1941 he was again drafted into military service. Despite continuing his career in teaching, his university years sparked an enduring interest in botany, with a specific fascination with lichens. His dissertation dealt with morphological deviations in lichens. These deviations can have various causes, from snail grazing and subsequent regenerations to diverging ecological conditions and infestations of lichens, which themselves represent a permanent symbiosis between fungi and algae or cyanobacteria, with specific parasitic fungi. The occurrence of these deviations repeatedly led to altered lichens being described as new species or varieties. Grummann developed a system for naming such deviations and presented it at the VII International Botanical Congress in Stockholm in 1950.

Following the end of World War II, in 1946 Grummann took on the role of department head at the Reich Institute for Film and Picture in Science and Education. At the same time, he was also a teacher at various high schools in Berlin. He was promoted to the position of senior teacher in 1954, and continued to work in this capacity in Berlin-Steglitz until he retired in 1963.

Throughout his academic career, Grummann made various contributions to the field of lichenology. He authored 18 publications related to various floristic projects, commencing in 1935. Among his noteworthy works was a collaboration with Johannes Hillmann on the cryptogams of Mark Brandenburg, published in 1957, and a systematic and floristic catalogue of lichens found in Germany, published in 1963.

Grummann also demonstrated a penchant for the meticulous organisation of records, as showcased by his magnum opus, the Biographisch-bibliographisches Handbuch der Lichenologie. Starting about 1960, Grummann worked for years on this comprehensive biographical-bibliographical handbook of lichenologists worldwide, listing every person who had ever mentioned a lichen in a scientific publication. The ambitious project listed 3865 authors from more than 40 countries, categorised by the author's country of birth and their focus area in lichenology. It also provided detailed personal and professional information, including birth and death details, academic record, employment history, and new taxa, among other aspects. Following Grummann's death in 1967, a colleague, Oscar Klement, completed the editing and published the book in 1974, thereby consolidating a wealth of hard-to-find information about lichen authors globally.

Vitus Grummann maintained a strong tie to his native Silesia and showed a keen interest in the works of various Silesian artists. He authored an article about the Silesian poet, Georg Hauptstock (1901–1944), and wrote his obituary. Grummann also undertook the biography of playwright Felix Kügele. He compiled a collection of Goethe's quotes in a book, subtitled Natur – Gott – Religion ("Nature - God - Religion"). Additionally, he published a letter he received from Nobel Prize winner, Gerhart Hauptmann (1862–1946).

== Recognition ==
Several lichen species have been named in honour of Grummann. These include: Micropeltella grummanniana Kirschst. (1935); Epigloea grummannii Döbbeler (1984); Lecidea grummannii Hertel (1968); Thelidium grummannii Servít (1946); and Verrucaria grummannii Servít (1939).

== Selected publications ==
- Grummann, V.J. (1935). "Die Flechtenflora der Insel Rügen und Hiddensee" [The lichen flora of the islands of Rügen and Hiddensee]. Feddes Repertorium Specierum Novarum Regni Vegetabilis (in German). 81A: 1–56.
- Hillmann, J. & Grummann, V. 1957: Kryptogamenflora der Mark Brandenburg und angrenzender Gebiete. Band VIII: Flechten. Berlin, Nikolassee: Gebrüder Borntraeger. 898 pp.
- Grummann, V.J. 1963. Catalogus Lichenum Germaniae: Ein systematisch-floristischer Katalog der Flechten Deutschlands.: i–viii, 1–208, pls. 1–2. Gustav Fischer Verlag, Stuttgart.
- Grummann, Vitus. 1974: Biographisch-bibliographisches Handbuch der Lichenologie. Nach dem Tode des Verfassers für die Herausgabe durchgesehen von Oscar Klement. Verlag von J. Cramer, Lehre, 839 pp, 43 plates.
