= Oscar Klement =

German lichenologist (1897–1980)

Oscar Anton Carl Klement
- Born: 19 April 1897; Chomutov, Bohemia, Austria-Hungary
- Died: 16 February 1980 (aged 82); Lindenberg im Allgäu, Bavaria, Germany
- Scientific career
- Fields: Lichenology
- Workplaces: Mannesmannröhren-Werke
- Author abbrev. (botany): Klem.

Oscar Anton Carl Klement (19 April 1897 – 16 February 1980) was a German Bohemian lichenologist. His contributions to lichenology include numerous botanical and zoological classifications, extensive research, and publications.

Klement's career spanned multiple disciplines, starting as a clerk and rising to directorship in Mannesmannröhren-Werke. His passion for nature led him to create personal botanical and zoological collections and make substantial contributions to botanical literature from the 1930s onwards. Introduced to lichenology by Josef Anders, Klement compiled a herbarium containing about 20,000 specimens and wrote nearly 100 titles related to floristic records, some of which were studies on lichens. Despite significant challenges due to political upheaval post-World War II, Klement continued his lichenological research, and his work influenced the field in Germany and Austria. Many lichen species and varieties have been named in his honour.

== Life and career ==
Oscar Klement was born on 19 April 1897 in Chomutov in Bohemia, Austria-Hungary, near the Czech–German border, to a family of German carpenters. Completing his primary education in Chomutov, his parents sent him to Most to learn trade. His initial career path began at sixteen as a clerk at a local chocolate factory. As World War I commenced, he volunteered for the Austro-Hungarian Navy, as a merchant ship officer. In 1921, Klement joined Mannesmannröhren-Werke's Chomutov branch as an accountant, serving as the company's commercial representative in Romania between 1935 and 1936.

From an early age, Klement was deeply interested in nature, independently identifying and classifying plants and animals, and in the process forming his personal botanical and zoological collections.His curiosity for biological research was apparently sparked by a plant identification book by Anton Schwaighofer, salvaged from the trash. His involvement with the Sudeten German Botanical Working Group enabled him to expand his network, particularly through Professor Adolf Pascher of Prague University. His contributions to botanical literature started in 1927, when he published a limnological and botanical overview of his birthplace and hometown. Between 1937 and 1944, he published a series of botanical, zoological, and geographical works. For example, he catalogued the little-observed fauna in the Ore Mountains, and dedicated special attention to the insect species found there.

Klement's introduction to lichenologist Josef Anders at a botanical conference led him to an interest in the study of lichens. He published Flechtenflora des Komotauer Bezirks in 1931 and later contributed further to the field with studies conducted in Romania, among other works. His scientific efforts were not confined to personal studies; he established worldwide connections with fellow lichenologists, avidly exchanged lichens and research tools, and accumulated a substantial lichenological literature collection.

By 1945, Klement had risen to the directorship of "Mannesmannröhren und Eisenhandel" in Chomutov, and his herbarium contained about 20,000 items. However, the post-World War II political upheaval forced Klement, along with numerous German-origin individuals residing in the Nazi-occupied Sudetenland after the Munich Agreement, to abandon his possessions, including his herbarium and large library. Klement's herbarium, confiscated in wartime, is now part of the lichenological collection of the National Museum in Prague.

After several years of logging work, Klement relocated to West Germany and found solace in the study of lichens. Professor Reinhold Tüxen offered him an assistant position at the Central Office for Vegetation Mapping in Stolzenau in 1947, where he devoted the next three years to mapping diverse mountain plant communities in Lower Saxony. In 1950, Klement resumed his business career in Hanover with his previous employer, Mannesmann. His work led him to ascend the corporate ladder, becoming the director general by 1958. He retired in 1962, after having dedicated twelve years to extensive lichenological research. His publication frequency gradually subsided in the 1970s.

Throughout the 1930s and onwards, Klement authored approximately 100 scientific works related to floristic records from various regions, both domestic and international. His notable works include research on lichen vegetation in the Canary Islands and a study on lichens found on serpentine soil in the Balkans, among others. He also completed Christian Friedo Eckhard Erichsen's lichen flora of northwestern Germany in 1957 and Vitus Grummann's massive biographic-bibliographic work in 1974. In the latter instance, Grumann died in 1967, after having worked on his compilation for seven years. As explained by Jack Laundon in a review of Grumann's work, "Dr Oscar Klement, himself in failing health, had bravely taken on the immense task of editing Dr Grummann's manuscripts and seeing the publication through the press". As a polyglot, Klement was adept at translating Latin diagnoses into new species descriptions. Throughout his career, he authored about 120 scientific articles, and discovered and formally described 16 previously unknown lichen taxa.

Klement spent his retirement initially in the remote Kreuzthal, where his hospitably open house became a scientific meeting point for many academic visitors. He spent his last years in Lindenberg im Allgäu withdrawn and alone. Klement died in Lindenberg on 16 February 1980.

== Recognition ==
Klement's scientific contributions, especially his Prodromus of Central European Lichen Communities published in 1955, earned him an honorary doctorate from the Faculty of Natural Sciences University of Bonn in 1959. In the homeland memorial work "Komotauer im Strom der Zeit" ("Komotauers in the Flow of Time"), he was included in recognition of his scientific achievements in the circle of significant personalities of Chomutov. Despite facing significant adversity during his expulsion, Klement maintained an optimistic perspective, becoming a significant figure in lichenology. His work influenced renowned lichenologists in Germany and Austria.

Several fungal and lichen taxa have been named to honour Oscar Klement. These include: Bulbothrix klementii Hale (1976); Chiodecton klementii Follmann (1968); Cladonia klementii Oxner (1969); Diploschistes klementianus Gyeln. (1937); Fulgensia klementii Kalb (1970); Lecanora klementii Anders (1936); Opegrapha klementii Cretz. (1938); Paraphysothele klementiana Servít (1955); Staurothele klementii O.Behr (1954); Thelidium klementii Servít (1954); and Verrucaria klementii Servít (1948). The varieties Diploschistes bryophilus var. klementianus Gyeln. (1937); Cetraria chlorophylla var. klementii (Servít) H.Magn. (1934); and Cetraria scutata var. klementii Servít (1933) are also named after him.

== Selected publications ==
- Klement, O. (1955). "Prodromus der mitteleuropaischen Flechtengesellschaften" [Prodromus of Central European lichen communities]. Feddes Repertorium (in German). 135: 5–194.
- Krause, W.; Klement, O. (1962). "Zur Kenntnis der Flora und Vegetation aus Sepentinstandorten des Balkans. 5. Flechten und Flechtengesellschaften auf Nord-Euboa (Griechenland)" [On the knowledge of the flora and vegetation from sepentine sites in the Balkans. 5. Lichens and lichen communities on North Euboa (Greece)]. Nova Hedwigia. 4: 189–262.
- Klement, O. (1965). "Zur Kenntnis der Flechtenvegetation der Kanarischen Inseln" [On the knowledge of the lichen vegetation of the Canary Islands]. Nova Hedwigia (in German). 9: 503–582.
- Schubert, R.; Klement, O. (1966). "Beitrag zur Flechtenflora von Nord- und Mittelindien" [Contribution to the lichen flora of North and Central India]. Nova Hedwigia. 11 (1–4): 1–73.
- Klement, O. (1969). "Zur Flechtenvegetation der Äolischen Inseln" [On the lichen vegetation of the Aeolian Islands]. Herzogia. 1 (2): 131–143. doi:10.1127/herzogia/1/1969/131.
