= Bulbothrix thomasiana =

Scientific classification
- Kingdom: Fungi
- Division: Ascomycota
- Class: Lecanoromycetes
- Order: Lecanorales
- Family: Parmeliaceae
- Genus: Bulbothrix
- Species: B. thomasiana

Binomial name
- Bulbothrix thomasiana Benatti & Marcelli (2011)

Species of lichen

Bulbothrix thomasiana is a species of foliose lichen in the family Parmeliaceae. It is a corticolous species that grows on tree trunks in the northern and central parts of South America. The lichen was formally described as a new species in 2011 by lichenologists Michel Benatti and Marcelo Marcelli. The specific epithet honours American lichenologist Thomas Hawkes Nash III. The species is distinguished by its unusual vegetative structures (isidia), which are uniquely fringed with tiny hair-like projections. It has been found growing on tree bark in tropical forests across northern South America, from Venezuela and French Guiana to central Brazil and Bolivia.

== Taxonomy ==
Bulbothrix thomasiana was formally described in 2011 by Michel Benatti and Marcelo Marcelli, who based the new species on a well-developed thallus collected in 1969 on the Kweikin-ima Tepui, Bolívar State, Venezuela. The authors separated it from the superficially similar B. apophysata because its vegetative propagules (isidia) are themselves rimmed with tiny, bulb-based cilia—a feature otherwise known only in B. fungicola and B. sipmanii. They also pointed to its uniformly pale-brown lower cortex, abundant rhizines the same colour as the cortex, ecoronate apothecia (with a plain, smooth margin rather than a ciliate or lobulate one), and medullary lobaric acid chemistry as reliable differentiators.

The type material of B. laevigatula was long thought to possess ciliate isidia, leading to confusion between that species, B. apophysata, and the unnamed taxon that is now B. thomasiana. Benatti and Marcelli re-examined the mixed "Leprieur 504" collections cited by earlier authors and showed that the true B. laevigatula has smooth isidia and a black lower surface, whereas the ciliate-isidiate fragments represent B. thomasiana. The specific epithet honours the American lichenologist Thomas Hawkes Nash III for his contributions to the study of parmelioid lichens.

== Description ==
The lichen forms small foliose rosettes up to about 4 cm across. Its lobes (laciniae) are narrow (0.3–1.0 mm wide), more or less linear, and loosely attached to the bark. Their margins are densely fringed with short (0.05–0.25 mm), repeatedly forked cilia that sit on glossy black, sub-spherical bases. The upper surface is continuous, smooth and dusky grey-green, showing no pale blotches (maculae). On the lobe surface arise plentiful cylindrical isidia 0.05–0.25 mm tall; these propagules share the thallus colour but often carry miniature bulbate cilia, giving the isidiate areas a slightly darker cast.

The medulla is white and reacts KC+ (rose) because of lobaric acid, while the cortex contains atranorin and turns yellow with potassium hydroxide solution (K+ yellow). Beneath, the cortex is pale brown—almost cream—throughout, glossy and densely clothed in rhizines that match its colour except for their tiny dark basal bulbs. Apothecia (fruiting bodies) are uncommon but when present are flattened discs 1–3.5 mm across with a smooth to faintly scalloped (crenulate) margin. The ascospores are small (5–7.5 × 3–5 μm), rounded to ellipsoid, and thin-walled. Pycnidia are rare; they produce very slender, weakly spindle-shaped conidia 5–7 μm long.

== Habitat and distribution ==
Bulbothrix thomasiana is corticolous, occurring on the bark of living trunks in lowland to sub-montane tropical forest. Confirmed records come from the Guiana Shield (type locality on the Venezuelan tepui and a nineteenth-century collection from Cayenne, French Guiana) and from central Brazil, where two specimens were gathered on a windswept escarpment near Chapada dos Guimarães, Mato Grosso, at about 500 m elevation. It was recorded from Bolivia in 2015.
