= Všestudy =

Všestudy may refer to places in the Czech Republic:

- Všestudy (Chomutov District), a municipality and village in the Ústí nad Labem Region
- Všestudy (Mělník District), a municipality and village in the Central Bohemian Region
