= R63 =

R63 may refer to:

== Roads ==
- R63 expressway (Czech Republic)
- R63 (South Africa)

== Other uses ==
- HMS Concord (R63), a destroyer of the Royal Navy
- HMS Venerable (R63), an aircraft carrier of the Royal Navy
- Mercedes-Benz R63 AMG, a performance-oriented MPV
- R63: Possible risk of harm to the unborn child, a risk phrase
- a size of light bulb reflector
- clipping of Rule 63
