= Zlosyň =

- Municipality
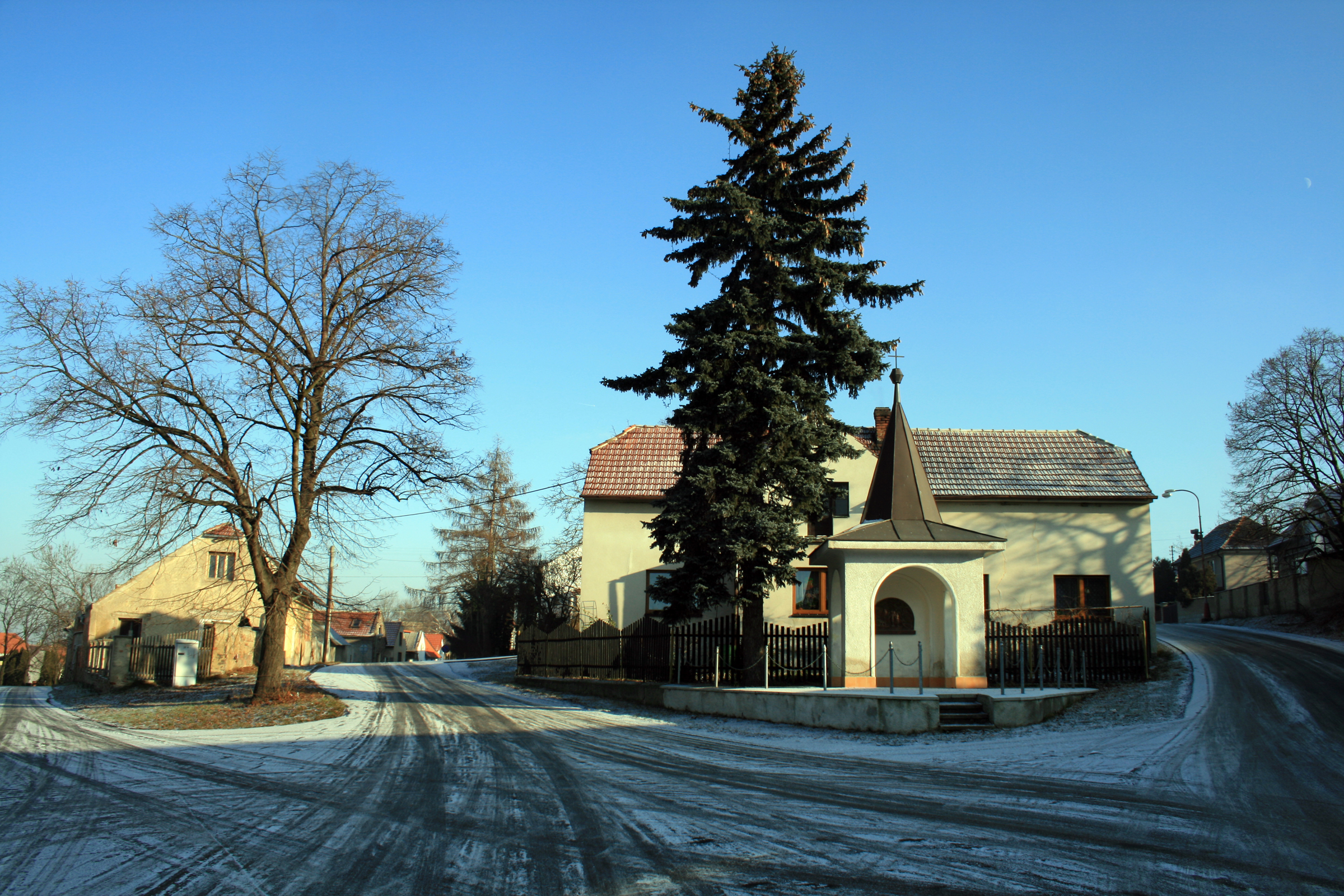
- Centre of Zlosyň

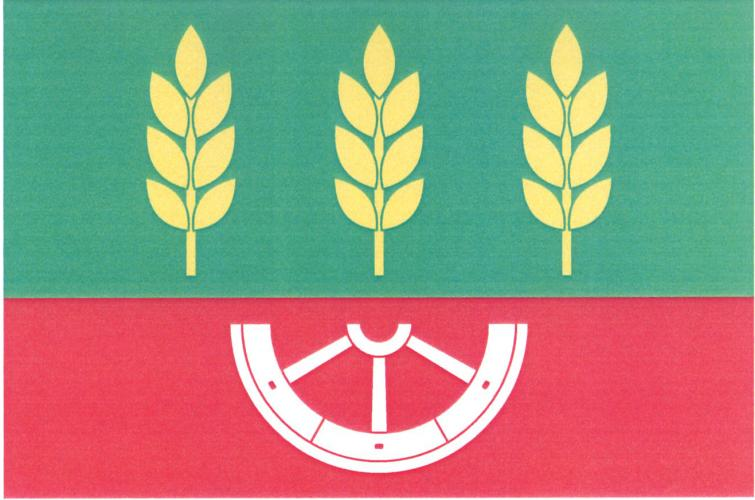
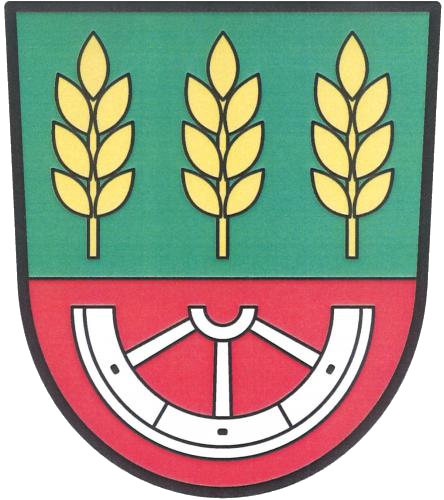
- Flag Coat of arms

- Location in the Czech Republic
- Coordinates: 50°16′41″N 14°22′7″E
- Country: Czech Republic
- Region: Central Bohemian
- District: Mělník
- First mentioned: 1316

Area
  - Total: 5.88 km^{2} (2.27 sq mi)
- Elevation: 179 m (587 ft)

Population (2026-01-01)
  - Total: 477
  - Density: 81.1/km^{2} (210/sq mi)
- Time zone: UTC+1 (CET)
  - Summer (DST): UTC+2 (CEST)
- Postal code: 277 44
- Website: www.zlosyn.cz

Zlosyň is a municipality and village in Mělník District in the Central Bohemian Region of the Czech Republic. It has about 500 inhabitants.

== Etymology ==
The name is derived either from the personal name Zlosyn or from the Czech word zlosyn (i.e. 'villain'), meaning "Zlosyn's/villain's".

== Geography ==
Zlosyň is located about 11 kilometres (7 mi) southwest of Mělník and 19 km (12 mi) north of Prague. It lies in the Central Elbe Table.

== History ==
The first written mention of Zlosyň is from 1316. According to a record from 1654, the village was probably destroyed during the Thirty Years' War and later restored. For centuries, the village was agricultural, but in the 19th century, residents began to commute to work in nearby industrial centres.

== Demographics ==
Historical population

Year	Pop.	±%
1869	344	—
1880	403	+17.2%
1890	422	+4.7%
1900	440	+4.3%
1910	494	+12.3%

Year	Pop.	±%
1921	490	−0.8%
1930	530	+8.2%
1950	450	−15.1%
1961	462	+2.7%
1970	420	−9.1%

Year	Pop.	±%
1980	377	−10.2%
1991	313	−17.0%
2001	326	+4.2%
2011	544	+66.9%
2021	583	+7.2%

Source: Censuses

== Transport ==
The D8 motorway from Prague to Ústí nad Labem runs through the municipality.

== Sights ==
The main landmark of Zlosyň and the most valuable building is the Baroque granary. In the centre of Zlosyň is a chapel from 1942.
