= Bundesautobahn 17 =

Federal motorway in Germany

A 17
- Bundesautobahn 17

Route information
- Length: 44.75 km (27.81 mi)

Major junctions
- North end: Dresden
- South end: Czech border

Location
- Country: Germany
- States: Saxony

Highway system
- Roads in Germany; Autobahns; List; Federal; List; State; E-roads
← A 15	→ A 19

Bundesautobahn 17 (translates from German as Federal Motorway 17, short form Autobahn 17, abbreviated as BAB 17 or A 17) is an autobahn in Saxony, south-eastern Germany. It links Dresden to the Czech border where the D8 continues to Prague. The road is a fairly new contribution to the German autobahn network. Construction began in 1998, with the first stretch opening in 2001 and the last in 2006.

== History ==
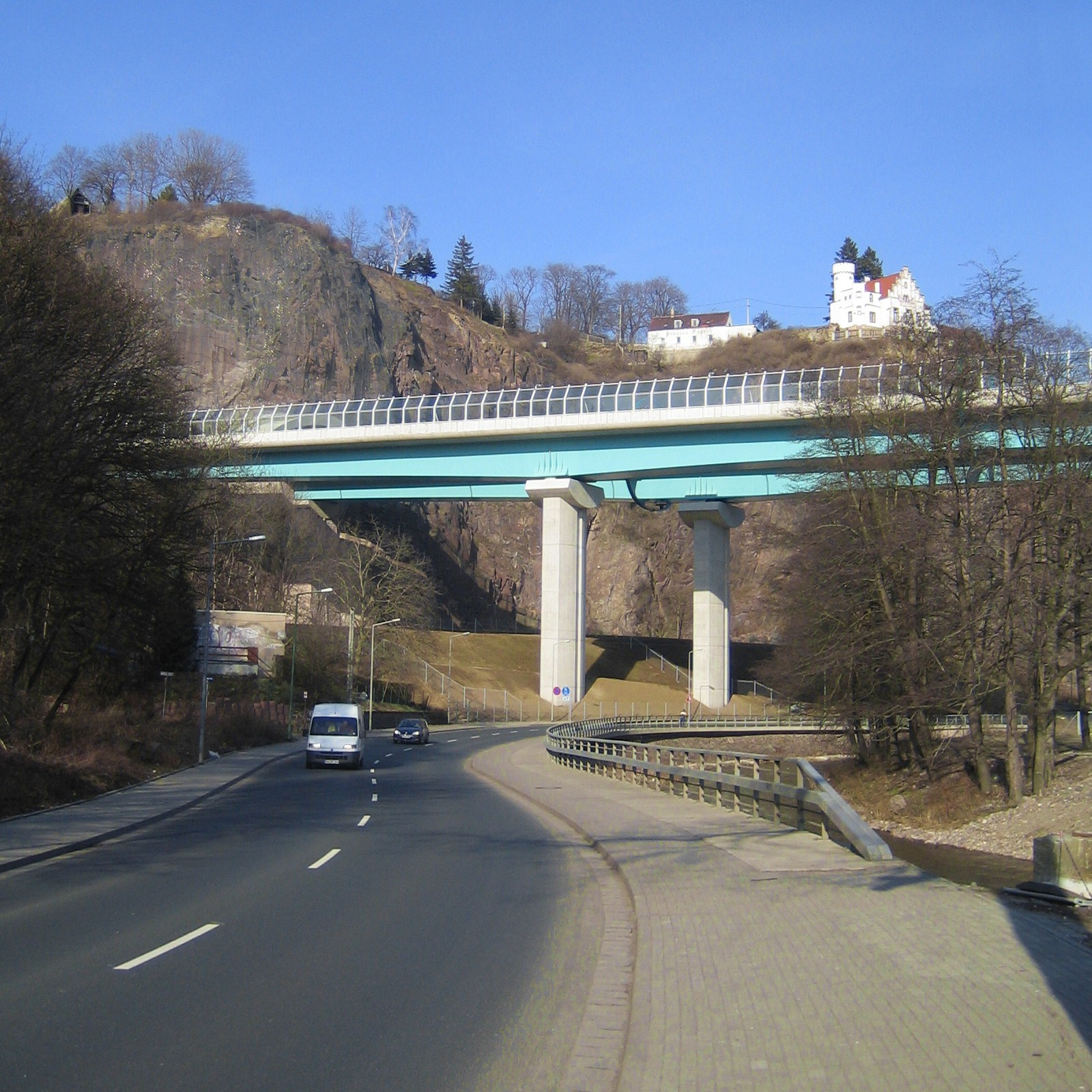
Bundesautobahn 17 crossing the Weißeritz valley in southern Dresden

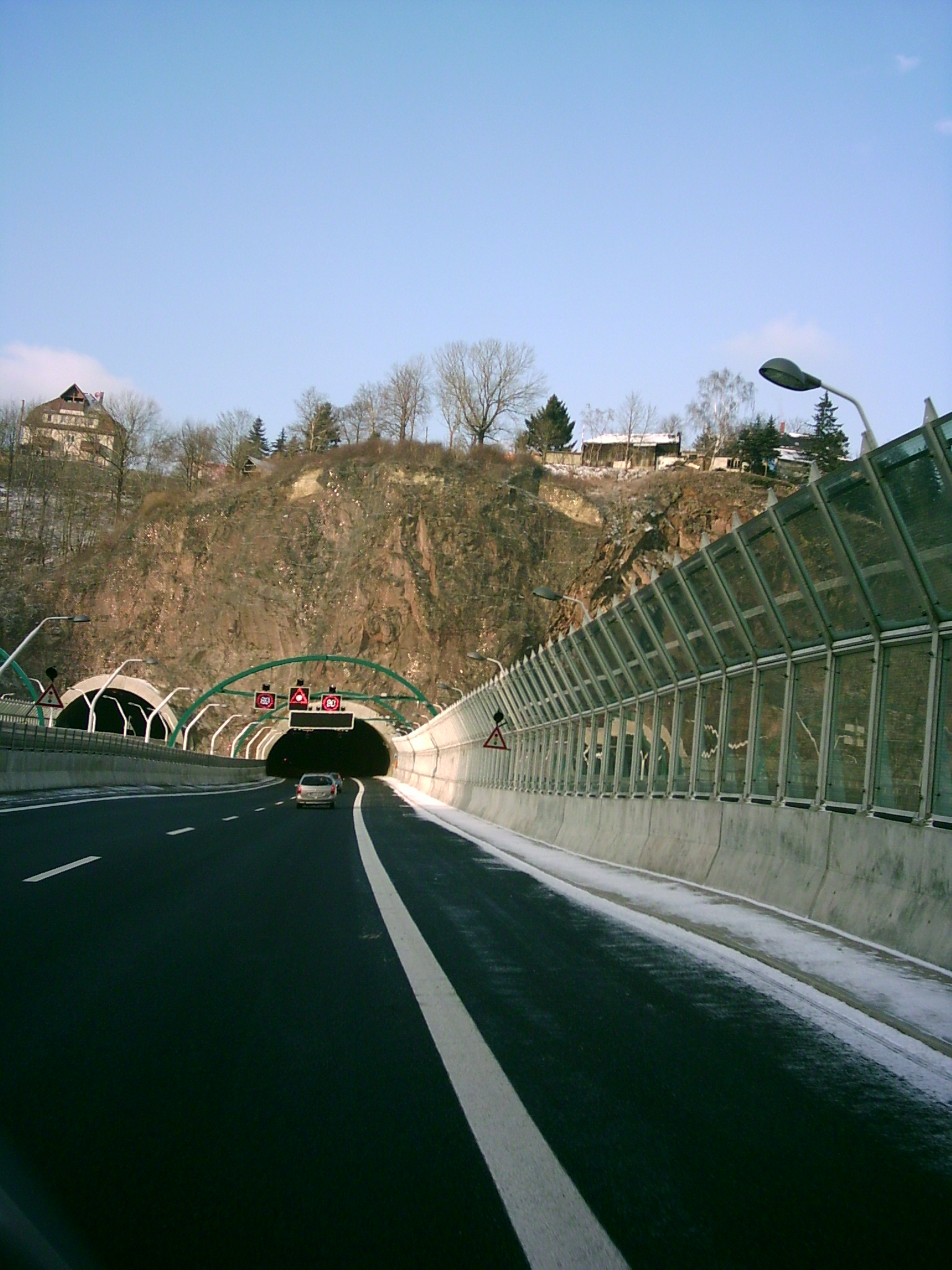
Tunnel bridge combination crossing the Weißeritz valley

The Dresden-Prague connection was first conceptualized in 1938 as Strecke 72. In Dresden, both a south-western variant and a north-eastern variant via the Dresdener Heide and Pirna were planned. The latter was chosen in 1940, but work was postponed owing to the war. In the late 1960s, the GDR revived the pre-war plans, and at the end of the 1970s, a southern route, similar to that existing today, was decided upon. However, probably for cost reasons, this project remained at planning stage.

After reunification, the German government decided that due to the increased truck traffic on federal highway (Bundesstraße) B170, construction had become more urgent. Building on the existing plans, various routes west of Dresden were designed, of which a relatively near-urban variant was adopted. The section from Pirna to the state border, however, was planned further to the west for reasons of landscape protection, as the original route would have touched the Saxon Switzerland National Park region.

The name A17 was earmarked for another highway in the early 1990s. This road was to lead southeast from Bautzen to Zittau and on to the Czech Republic, where it would connect with the D35. In Zittau a triangular junction was to connect with the A18 from Cottbus to Zittau, which has not been built. Part of this route has been built and numbered B178n. Today's A17 is eventually to be renumbered as part of the A13.

Several citizens' initiatives and environmental groups (including the Green League) opposed construction, while the Bundestag, the Federal Ministry of Transport and the Saxon cabinet pushed it on economic grounds. The Dresden City Council rejected a variant of the A17 which cut through the city as it feared, among other things, unacceptable noise and air pollution. Even the then mayor of Dresden, Herbert Wagner (CDU), failed with his veto. Then a citizens' initiative for the construction of the A17 was founded, which initiated a referendum together with parts of the Dresden CDU-Stadtspitze. On 5 November 1995, about 50% of the Dresden electorate took part in this referendum, of whom around 2/3 voted in favour of the construction of the city-cutting variant.

The plan went through an environmental impact study, to prevent damage to the habitat. The hills are not required to be flattened:

- FFH (Fauna-Flora-Habitat-Richtlinie - Habitats Directive) area 37E - Valleys of the United and Wilder Weisseritz
- FFH area 179 - Lockwitzgrund and Wilisch (compatibility with low-wing bridge, see above)
- FFH area 180 - Meuschaer Höhe (compatibility by green bridge)
- FFH area 85E - Seidewitztal and Börnersdorfer Bach (compatibility through arch bridge without supports in the valley bottom)
- FFH area 181 - Bahrebachtal (Compatibility by slight circumvention)
- FFH area 42E - low mountain range around Oelsen (compatibility through light environment and minimal contact) directly on the border with the Czech Republic

The first part of the first construction phase stretches from Autobahndreieck Dresden-West (A4) to junction Dresden-Gorbitz (B173). This 3.6 km long route was built from August 1998, released on 8 October 2001 and cost about €53.6 million. In March 2007 the feeder into Dresden (B173 Coventrystraße), was expanded to four lanes. A local bypass for Kesselsdorf on the B173 was built between 2009 and 2011. As a feeder to Freital the State Road 36 was relocated and expanded. Coventrystraße, named after the British town which suffered bombing similar to Dresden's, was formerly named Hermann-Matern-Straße, after SED minister and the honorary of Dresden.

The second part of the first construction phase stretches from the Dresden-Gorbitz junction (B173) to Dresden-Südvorstadt (B170). The 8.6 km long route cost €286 million. 87% of the cost was accounted for by tunnel and bridge construction over Plauenschen Grund and the Weisseritz between Dölzschen (Dölzschen tunnel) and Coschütz (Coschütz tunnel). Here, each meter of tunnel tube cost about €40,000. The construction of this part started in the spring of 2000. Also on this part of the route is the Altfranken tunnel. The opening of this second section was postponed after a cable fire in the Coschütz tunnel from October 2004 until 22 December 2004. As early as autumn 2005, extensive repair work in the tunnels was necessary to eliminate construction defects.

The first part of the second construction phase goes from the junction (AS) Dresden-Südvorstadt (B170) to Dresden-Prohlis. The 3-km route cost €45 million and was released on 25 October 2004, before the first construction phase was completed. From the AS Dresden-Prohlis a new feeder to the then B172 was built to relieve Kauscha and Dresden-Nickern. This bypass leads as the S191 through Goppeln and Rippien to the B170 in Bannewitz (Hänichen).

The remaining portion of the second construction phase, from the Dresden-Prohlis junction to Pirna, is 9.9 km long and was released on 22 July 2005. Construction costs amounted to €113 million. On the opening date, only the northern side of the Lockwitztal Bridge was completed, with the other carriageway being opened on 13 December 2005. A feeder was built by the AS Heidenau, on the one hand to the B172 and 2007 on the other hand between Borthen and Röhrsdorf and further in the direction of Wittgensdorf. The AS Pirna is located near Dohna, from where the B172a was built four-lane to Pirna.

From the connection point, Pirna to the Czech border is 19.3 km. Construction was officially started on 8 December 2004, and work on the bridges has been ongoing since the spring of 2004. He cost about €154 million. On 21 December 2006, the motorway from Dresden to the border and on the Czech side the continuation as D8 to Ústí nad Labem for traffic was released.

== Location ==
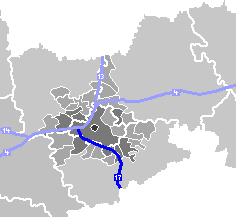
Greater Dresden, run of the A 17 highlighted

The A 17 is one of three autobahns that have one of their end points at the Bundesautobahn 4 near Dresden. The other two are the Bundesautobahn 13 at the northern Dresden autobahn triangle (Dresden – Berlin) and the Bundesautobahn 14 at the Nossen autobahn triangle (Dresden – Leipzig).

The A 17 begins at the western Dresden autobahn triangle, generally follows the edge of the city to the south, passing the towns of Heidenau and Pirna until it reaches the border between Germany and the Czech Republic at the Ore Mountains, where it ends. From there the D8 continues to Prague.

== Features ==
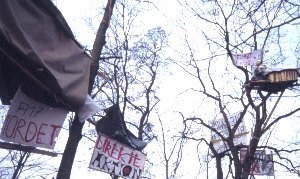
A Protestcamp against A 17 existed in Zschonergrund (Zöllmen) from April 1997 until April 21st 1999.

Although the A 17 is only 45 km long, it has quite a lot of larger bridges and tunnels compared to other German autobahns. These are:

- The Altfranken landscape tunnel takes the road under the castle park ("Luckner Park") in the village of Altfranken. The biotope connection was built between 2000 and 2004 using the cut and cover method. At a length of 345m, the underpass has two tubes containing two eastward lanes and three westward.
- The Dölzschener tunnel consists of two tubes and passes under the Dresden district of Dölzschen and is 1070m long. As it rises slightly to the west, the northern lane is three-lane, but has no hard shoulder. The tunnel was built using the New Austrian tunneling method.
- The Coschützer Tunnel is the longest tunnel on the A17 and passes under the Dresden district of Coschütz. The two tubes of the tunnel with two lanes each and a hard shoulder are 2332m long. It too was built according to the New Austrian tunnelling method. It is connected to the Dölzschen tunnel via the Weißeritztal bridge in Plauenschen Grund.
- The Lockwitztalbrücke is both the longest bridge and the tallest bridge on the A17. It is 723m long and spans the valley floor up to 64m above sea level on the southern outskirts of Dresden. The bridge has spans of up to 125m and uses a new type of construction with bow-shaped inclined struts made of reinforced concrete. This enabled the number of pillars to be limited to eight, out of consideration for the fauna-flora habitat in the valley. The bridge has a curve radius of 2500m; the centre of the district lies north of the bridge. It was completed in December 2005.
- The Seidewitzalbrücke spans the valley of the same name near Pirna over a length of 568m. With a span of 154m, it is the largest arched bridge in Saxony and reaches up to 55m above ground. The massive parabolic arch was erected using guyed freestanding construction. The bridge was completed in 2006.
- The German-Czech border post was called Breitenau-Krásný Les/Schönwald, and stood about 4.7 km from the actual border on the German side at Börnersdorf-Breitenau. From the outset it was very simply equipped, as it was already foreseen that checks would cease when the Czech Republic acceded to the Schengen Agreement on 21 December 2007 - exactly one year after the opening of the border crossing. The site of the border post was then converted into a parking lot. In addition, a German-Czech police station was opened in Petrovice/Peterswald.
- In the immediate vicinity of the border is the 282-meter-long (925 ft) Nasenbachtalbrücke, directly adjoining the 300-meter-long (980 ft) Harthe landscape tunnel. Directly following it is the 412m-long border bridge over the Schönwalder Bach, built by the Czech Republic. The road on the Czech side, on the slope of the 723-meter-high (2,372 ft) Špičák (saddle mountain), reaches the road's highest point, about 650m above sea level. Shortly after the start of the Panenská tunnel, a few metres beyond the Petrovice junction, is the Erzgebirge watershed, which divides the catchment areas of the rivers flowing into the Elbe/Labe through Bohemia and Saxony respectively.

The designation of A 17 was originally given to a post-reunification Autobahn corridor planned to run from the A 4 near Bautzen to the Polish border at Zittau (actually very close to the German-Polish-Czech tripoint). Planning for this incarnation of the A 17 was shelved in the 1990s before any fixed route for this Autobahn was established, and the designation was given instead to the southernmost section (then being planned) of the A 13.
