= Bulbothrix johannis =

Scientific classification
- Domain: Eukaryota
- Kingdom: Fungi
- Division: Ascomycota
- Class: Lecanoromycetes
- Order: Lecanorales
- Family: Parmeliaceae
- Genus: Bulbothrix
- Species: B. johannis

Binomial name
- Bulbothrix johannis D.M.Masson, Benatti & Sérus. (2015)

Species of lichen

Bulbothrix johannis is a species of corticolous (bark-dwelling), foliose lichen in the family Parmeliaceae. Found on Réunion, it was formally described as new species in 2015 by Didier Masson, Michel Benatti, and Emmanuël Sérusiaux. The type specimen was collected by the first author from Bélouve (Salazie) at an altitude of 1,700 m (5,600 ft), where it was found growing on the bark of Erica reunionensis. All known localities of the lichen are in Réunion National Park, at altitudes ranging between 1,330–1,860 m (4,360–6,100 ft). The species epithet, derived from the Latin Johannes, honours Australian lichenologist John Elix, "who was the first to suspect it was an undescribed taxon and for his generous help and support on many occasions".

Bulbothrix johannis is comparable to Bulbothrix pseudofungicola, but its lobes are wider, ranging from 0.4 to 2.0 mm as opposed to 0.4–1.1 mm. Additionally, it has laminal isidia that frequently mature into phyllidia, larger cilia and rhizines, and longer ascospores measuring 6.0–9.0 μm, while B. pseudofungicola has ascospores ranging from 4.0 to 6.0 μm in length.
