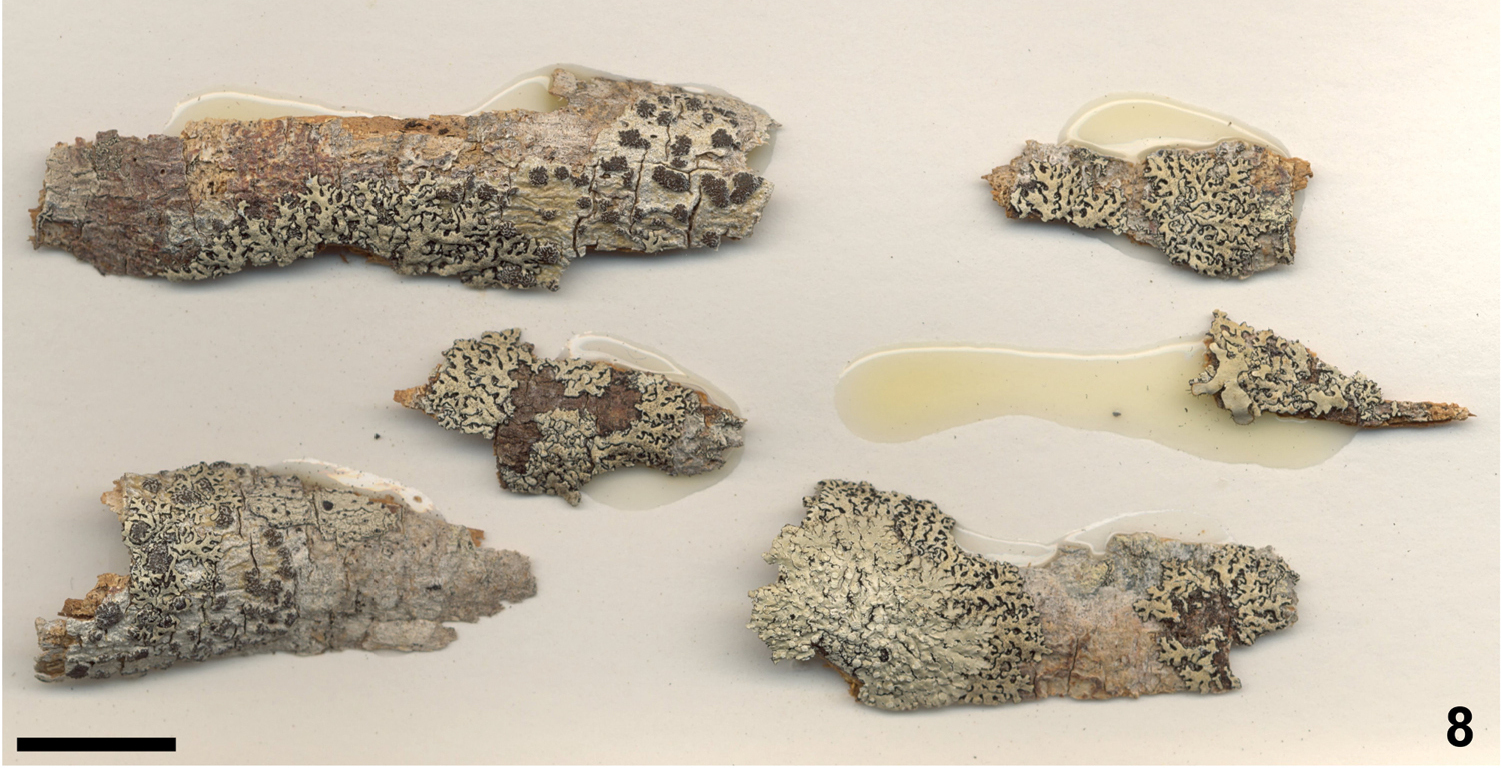
- Dried specimens of the holotype of Bulbothrix lordhowensis

Scientific classification
- Kingdom: Fungi
- Division: Ascomycota
- Class: Lecanoromycetes
- Order: Lecanorales
- Family: Parmeliaceae
- Genus: Bulbothrix; Hale (1974)

Type species
- Bulbothrix semilunata (Lynge) Hale (1974)

Synonyms
- Bulborrhizina Kurok.; Bulbothricella V.Marcano, S.Mohali & A.Morales (1996)

= Bulbothrix =

Genus of lichens

Bulbothrix is a genus of lichen-forming fungi in the family Parmeliaceae. Established in 1974 by the American lichenologist Mason Hale as a segregate from the genus Parmelia, Bulbothrix comprises about 40 accepted species as of 2025. These foliose lichens are distinguished by their characteristic black, bulb-tipped hairs (cilia) along the lobe edges and are found roughly equally divided between the Old World and New World, growing predominantly on trees in lowland rainforests and shrublands.

== Taxonomy ==
Bulbothrix was circumscribed by the American lichenologist Mason E. Hale in 1974 with Bulbothrix semilunata as the type species. Hale established Bulbothrix as a segregate from Parmelia, specifically from the subgenus Parmelia section Imbricariae subsection Bicornutae. He noted that Bulbothrix is readily recognised by its characteristic black marginal bulbous cilia, which distinguishes it from related genera. Hale observed that the species are roughly equally divided between the Old World and the New World, occurring predominantly on trees in lowland rainforest and in scrub or secondary forests at lower elevations in subtropical to temperate regions.

This genus is synonymous with Bulbothricella V.Marcano, S.Mohali & A.Morales, and with Bulborrhizina Kurok..

== Description ==
Bulbothrix develops a foliose (leafy) thallus that lies closely attached (adnate) to the bark or rock it inhabits. Its lobes are narrow to moderately broad and usually press against one another, though in a few species such as B. isidiza they may overlap slightly. Along the lobe edges run short, bulb-tipped hairs called cilia, a feature that gives the genus its name. The upper surface is grey because it contains atranorin, a common lichen product, and may show pale blotches (maculae); some species bear tiny outgrowths (isidia) or small side lobes, but none produce soredia (powdery propagules) or pores for gas exchange (pseudocyphellae). Microscopically the upper cortex consists of a palisade of tightly packed fungal cells coated by a thin, perforated epicortex, and the cell walls contain the rare polysaccharide isolichenan. Beneath this, a loosely woven white—or occasionally pigmented—medulla stores nutrients, while the pale tan to black undersurface anchors itself with simple to repeatedly branched root-like rhizines that match the background colour.

Sexual reproduction occurs in apothecia that sit on the thallus surface and are either somewhat stalked (subpedicellate) or directly attached. Their cup-shaped discs are unperforated, range from pale to dark brown, and may be ringed by small black swellings (bulbae) embedded in the rim, though in some species this corona is absent. Each ascus contains eight ellipsoidal or occasionally curved, two-horned (bicornute) ascospores measuring roughly 6–15 × 4–8 μm. Asexual propagules are generated in flask-shaped pycnidia, either sunken in the thallus or raised on the same bulbae that flank the apothecia; these structures release slender, spindle-shaped conidia about 5–9 × 1 μm that disperse the fungal partner alone. Chemical tests detect a suite of secondary metabolites—including sphaerophorin, various β-orcinol depsidones, usnic acid, and dibenzofuran derivatives.

== Species ==
Hale accepted 29 species of Bulbothrix in his original circumscription of the genus in 1976. As of July 2025, Species Fungorum (in the Catalogue of Life) accept 37 species of Bulbothrix.

- Bulbothrix apophysata (Hale & Kurok.) Hale (1974)
- Bulbothrix asiatica Y.Y.Zhang & Li S.Wang (2014)
- Bulbothrix australiensis Hale (1986)
- Bulbothrix bicornuta (Müll.Arg.) Hale (1974)
- Bulbothrix bulbillosa Benatti, A.A.Spielm. & Bungartz (2013) – Galápagos Islands
- Bulbothrix caribensis Marcelli & Benatti (2011)
- Bulbothrix cassa Jungbluth, Marcelli & Elix (2008) – Brazil
- Bulbothrix cinerea Marcelli & Kalb (2002)
- Bulbothrix goebelii (Zenker) Hale (1976)
- Bulbothrix isidiza (Nyl.) Hale (1974)
- Bulbothrix johannis D.M.Masson, Benatti & Sérus. (2015)
- Bulbothrix klementii Hale (1976)
- Bulbothrix lacinia Y.Y.Zhang & Li S.Wang (2016)
- Bulbothrix lacinulata Marcelli, Jungbluth & Elix (2008) – Brazil
- Bulbothrix laeviuscula (Räsänen) Benatti (2012)
- Bulbothrix lobarica Jungbluth, Marcelli & Elix (2008) – Brazil
- Bulbothrix lordhowensis Elix (1995)
- Bulbothrix lyngei Benatti & Marcelli (2011)
- Bulbothrix mammillaria Y.Y.Zhang & Li S.Wang (2016)
- Bulbothrix megapotamica Canêz & Marcelli (2008)
- Bulbothrix microscopica Elix (1993) – Australia
- Bulbothrix pseudocoronata (Gyeln.) Benatti (2012)
- Bulbothrix pseudofungicola Benatti & Marcelli (2012) – Brazil
- Bulbothrix queenslandica (Elix & G.N.Stevens) Elix (1993)
- Bulbothrix regnelliana Jungbluth, Marcelli & Elix (2008) – Brazil
- Bulbothrix semilunata (Lynge) Hale (1974)
- Bulbothrix silicisrea Marcelli & Benatti (2012) – Brazil
- Bulbothrix sipmanii Aptroot & Aubel (1999) – Guyana
- Bulbothrix subscortea (Asahina) Marcelli & Benatti (2012)
- Bulbothrix subtabacina (Elix) Elix (1993)
- Bulbothrix tabacina (Mont. & Bosch) Hale (1974)
- Bulbothrix thomasiana Benatti & Marcelli (2011)
- Bulbothrix ventricosa (Hale & Kurok.) Hale (1974)
- Bulbothrix viatica A.A.Spielm. & Marcelli (2008) – Brazil
- Bulbothrix yunnana Sheng L.Wang, J.B.Chen & Elix (2000) – China
