= Všestudy (Mělník District) =

- Municipality
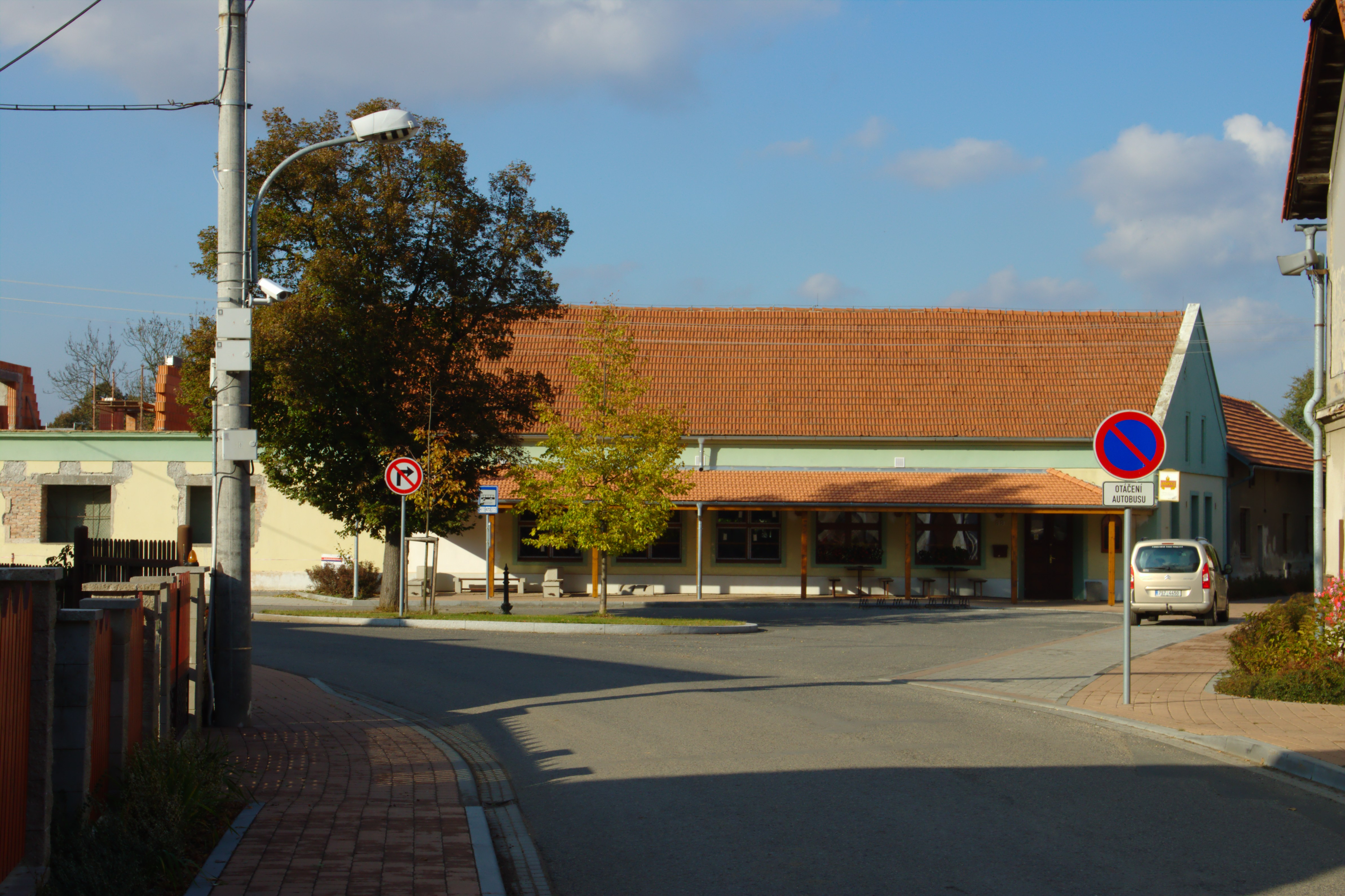
- Centre of Všestudy

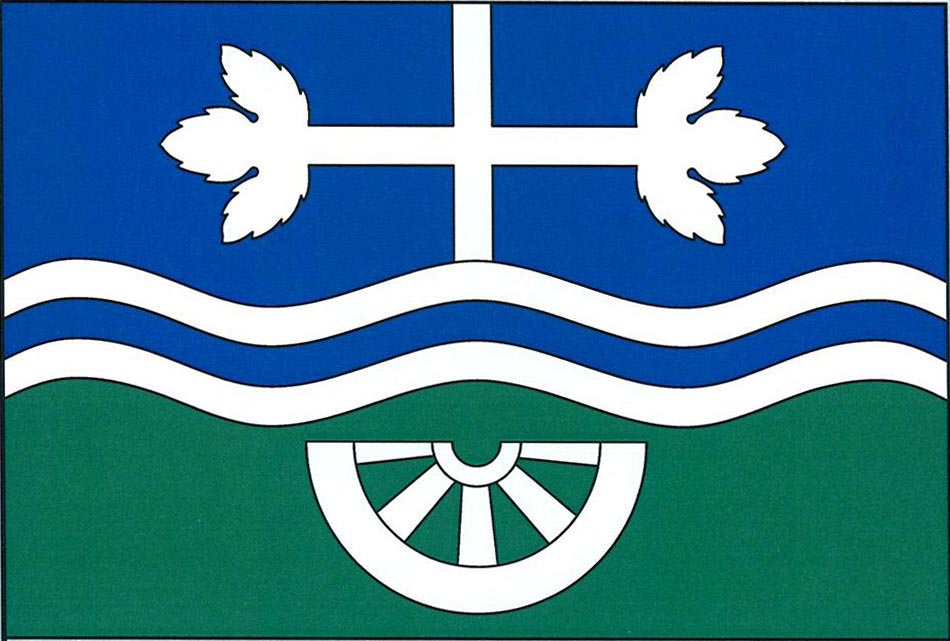
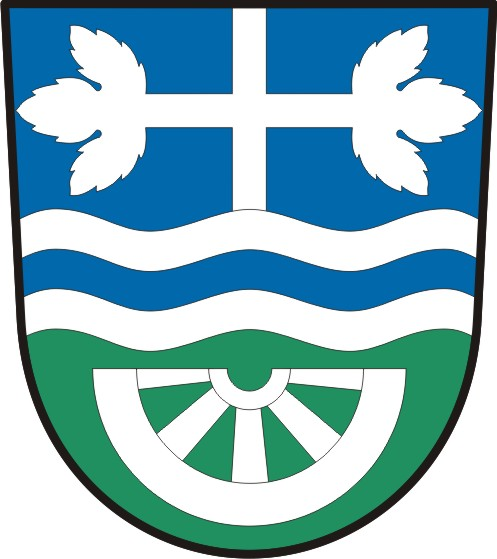
- Flag Coat of arms

- Location in the Czech Republic
- Coordinates: 50°17′27″N 14°20′34″E
- Country: Czech Republic
- Region: Central Bohemian
- District: Mělník
- First mentioned: 1295

Area
  - Total: 4.72 km^{2} (1.82 sq mi)
- Elevation: 170 m (560 ft)

Population (2026-01-01)
  - Total: 459
  - Density: 97.2/km^{2} (252/sq mi)
- Time zone: UTC+1 (CET)
  - Summer (DST): UTC+2 (CEST)
- Postal codes: 277 44, 277 46
- Website: vsestudy-obec.cz

Všestudy is a municipality and village in Mělník District in the Central Bohemian Region of the Czech Republic. It has about 500 inhabitants.

== Administrative division ==
Všestudy consists of three municipal parts (in brackets population according to the 2021 census):

- Všestudy (398)
- Dušníky nad Vltavou (29)

== Etymology ==
The name is derived from the Czech words vše ('all') and studiti ('be ashamed').

== Geography ==
Všestudy is located about 19 kilometres (12 mi) north of Prague. It lies in a flat agricultural landscape in the Central Elbe Table. The Vltava River briefly forms part of the municipal border in the north.

== History ==
The first written mention of Všestudy is from 1295.

== Demographics ==
Historical population

Year	Pop.	±%
1869	337	—
1880	364	+8.0%
1890	424	+16.5%
1900	474	+11.8%
1910	449	−5.3%

Year	Pop.	±%
1921	519	+15.6%
1930	505	−2.7%
1950	430	−14.9%
1961	474	+10.2%
1970	454	−4.2%

Year	Pop.	±%
1980	398	−12.3%
1991	348	−12.6%
2001	342	−1.7%
2011	338	−1.2%
2021	427	+26.3%

Source: Censuses

== Transport ==
The D8 motorway from Prague to Ústí nad Labem runs through the municipality.

== Sights ==
There are no protected cultural monuments in the municipality.
