= Bulbothrix klementii =

Scientific classification
- Domain: Eukaryota
- Kingdom: Fungi
- Division: Ascomycota
- Class: Lecanoromycetes
- Order: Lecanorales
- Family: Parmeliaceae
- Genus: Bulbothrix
- Species: B. klementii

Binomial name
- Bulbothrix klementii Hale (1976)

Species of lichen

Bulbothrix klementii is a species of corticolous (bark-dwelling), foliose lichen in the family Parmeliaceae. Originally found in Venezuela, it has since been recorded in Australia and Brazil.

== Taxonomy ==
Bulbothrix klementii was formally described as a new species in 1976 by lichenologist Mason Hale. The species epithet honours Czech lichenologist Oscar Klement, who, according to Hale, had seen the material and correctly identified it as a member of the Parmeliaceae. The type specimen was collected by German botanist Karl Mägdefrau in the Cerro Pavón near the Atabapo River (Venezuela) in 1958.

== Description ==
The thallus of Bulbothrix klementii is closely attached to its bark substrate. With a pale straw-yellow to whitish coloration, the thallus extends to a width of 1–2 cm (0.4–0.8 in). It is characterized by its sublinear lobes that branch dichotomously and are distinctly separated from each other. The margins of these lobes are particularly notable for their bulbous-ciliate structure, adorned with shiny, orbicular bulbs that feature forked-ciliate tips measuring 0.6–1.1 mm in width.

The upper surface of the lichen is generally flat, although it may exhibit transverse cracks with age. Bulbothrix klementii has simple, cylindrical isidia with a moderate density. The upper cortex measures between 10 and 12 μm in thickness and is composed of relatively vertical cells. Immediately below this lies the photobiont layer that is 14 μm thick. The lichen's medulla, or inner tissue, is white in colour, measuring between 80 and 95 μm in thickness.

The lower cortex has a paraplectenchymatous structure, measuring 11–12 μm in thickness. The colour underneath the lichen is a pale, dull brick-red. Another feature of the lichen is the dense rhizines (root-like structures), which are pale and measure around 24 μm in thickness. These rhizines show a dichotomous or forked branching pattern. Apothecia have not been observed in Bulbothrix klementii.

The expected results of standard chemical spot tests for this lichen are K+ (yellow) in the cortex, and K−, C−, and P− in the medulla. Lichen products in this species are atranorin and colensoinic acid; the presence of the latter substance is somewhat unusual, as it had only been found in the genera Stereocaulon and Hypotrachyna.

== Habitat and distribution ==
Originally described in Venezuela, the lichen was later recorded in New South Wales (Australia), and Brazil. It grows on tree bark.
