= Zdiby =

- Municipality
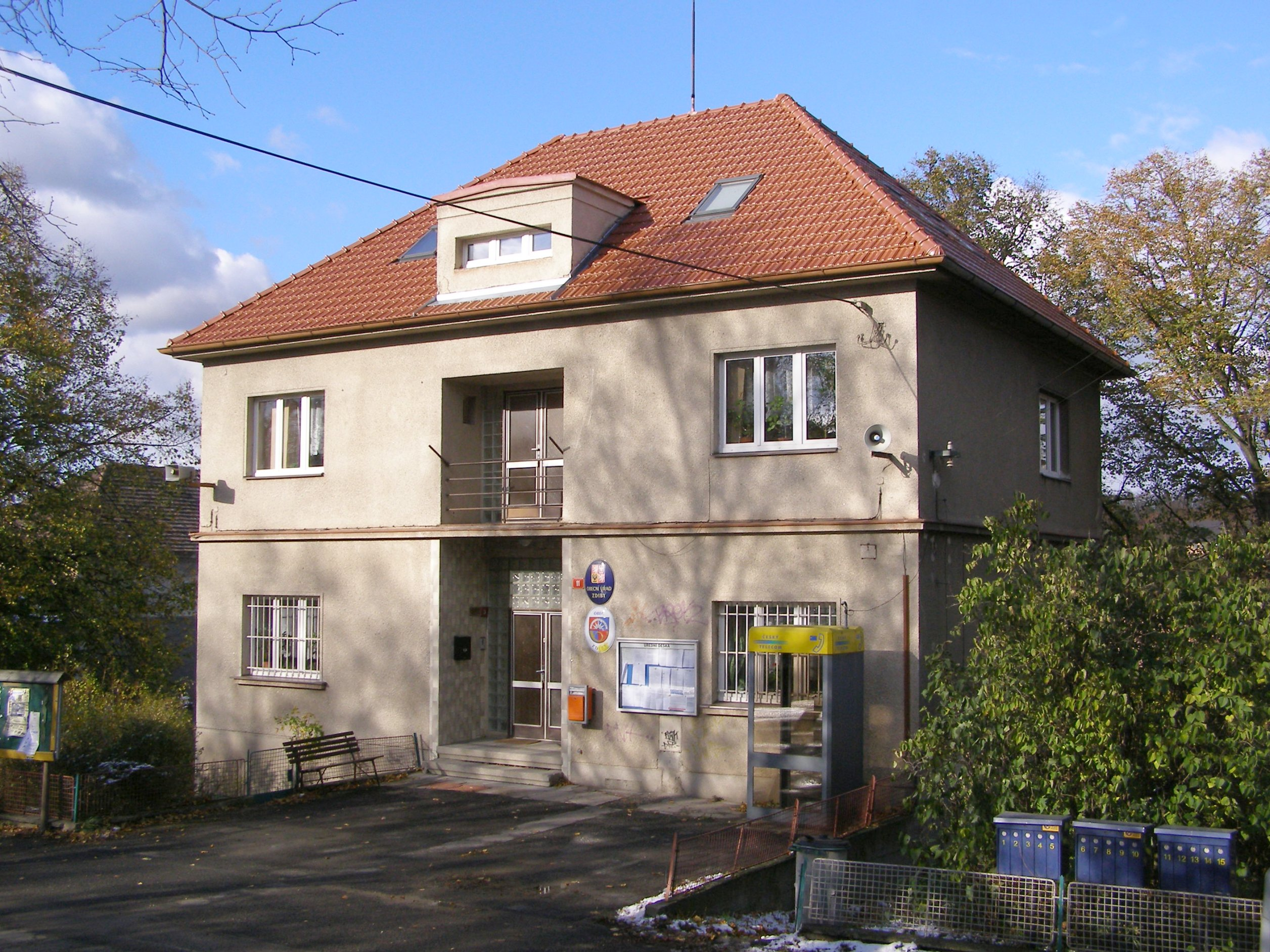
- Municipal office

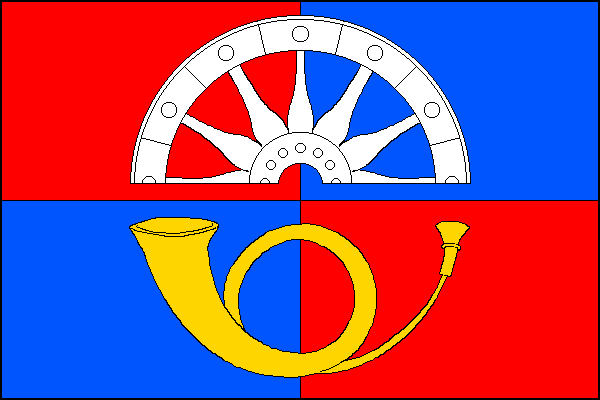
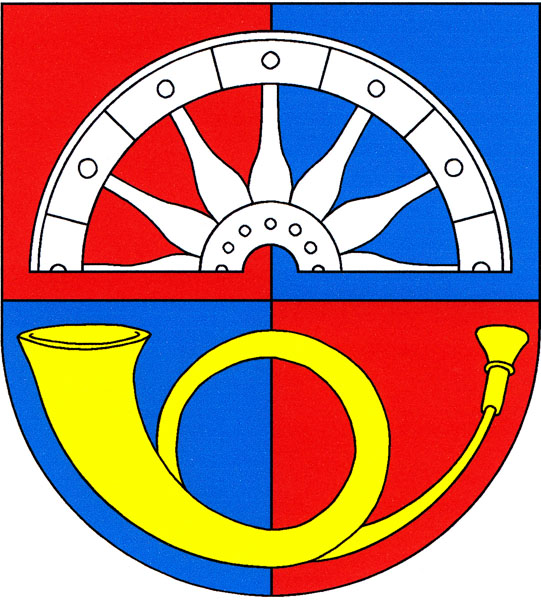
- Flag Coat of arms

- Location in the Czech Republic
- Coordinates: 50°10′5″N 14°27′5″E
- Country: Czech Republic
- Region: Central Bohemian
- District: Prague-East
- First mentioned: 1266

Area
  - Total: 9.96 km^{2} (3.85 sq mi)
- Elevation: 295 m (968 ft)

Population (2026-01-01)
  - Total: 4,088
  - Density: 410/km^{2} (1,060/sq mi)
- Time zone: UTC+1 (CET)
  - Summer (DST): UTC+2 (CEST)
- Postal code: 250 66
- Website: www.obeczdiby.cz

Zdiby (Czech pronunciation: [ˈzɟɪbɪ]) is a municipality and village in Prague-East District in the Central Bohemian Region of the Czech Republic. It has about 4,100 inhabitants.

== Administrative division ==
Zdiby consists of four municipal parts (in brackets population according to the 2021 census):

- Zdiby (978)
- Brnky (1,005)
- Přemyšlení (1,847)
- Veltěž (552)

== Etymology ==
The name is derived from the personal name Zdib, meaning "the village of Zdibs (Zdib family)".

== Geography ==
Zdiby is located about 4 kilometres (2 mi) north of Prague. It lies in a flat landscape in the Prague Plateau. The municipality is situated on the right bank of the Vltava River.

== History ==
The first written mention of Zdiby is from 1266. Until 1420, the village was property of the Augustinian convent in New Town, Prague. Then it was owned by various noble families and often changed hands. The most notable owners were the Radecký of Radeč family in the 17th century.

== Demographics ==
Historical population

Year	Pop.	±%
1869	790	—
1880	811	+2.7%
1890	848	+4.6%
1900	942	+11.1%
1910	996	+5.7%

Year	Pop.	±%
1921	949	−4.7%
1930	1,092	+15.1%
1950	1,243	+13.8%
1961	1,319	+6.1%
1970	1,116	−15.4%

Year	Pop.	±%
1980	1,054	−5.6%
1991	971	−7.9%
2001	1,129	+16.3%
2011	3,013	+166.9%
2021	4,382	+45.4%

Source: Censuses

== Transport ==
The D8 motorway from Prague to Ústí nad Labem runs through the municipality.

Zdiby is served by suburban buses within the Prague Integrated Transport system.

== Sights ==
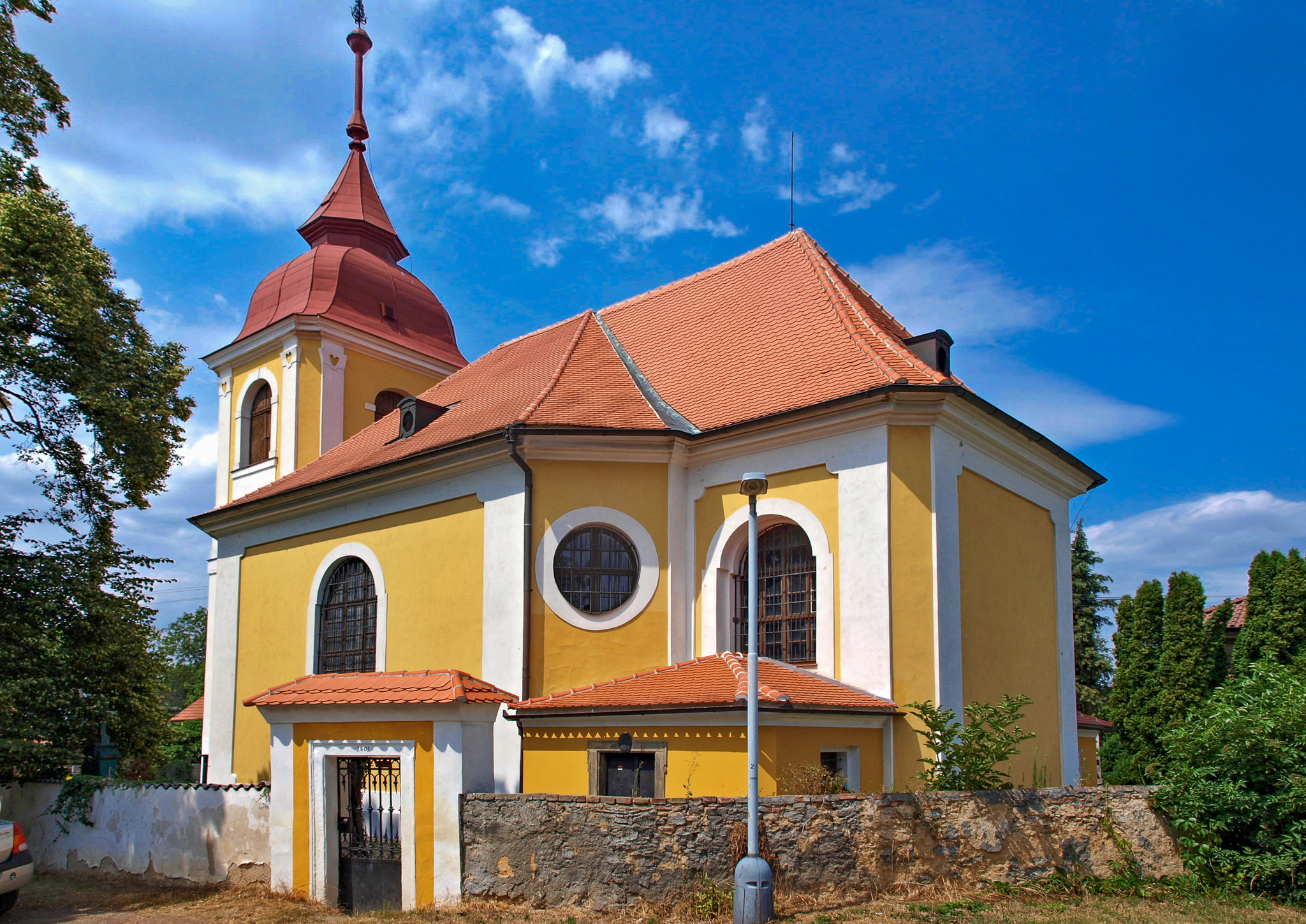
Church of the Exaltation of the Holy Cross

The main landmark of Zdiby is the Church of the Exaltation of the Holy Cross. It was built in the first half of the 14th century. The current Baroque structure dates from 1734.

== Notable people ==
- Natálie Puškinová (born 2004), Miss Earth 2025
