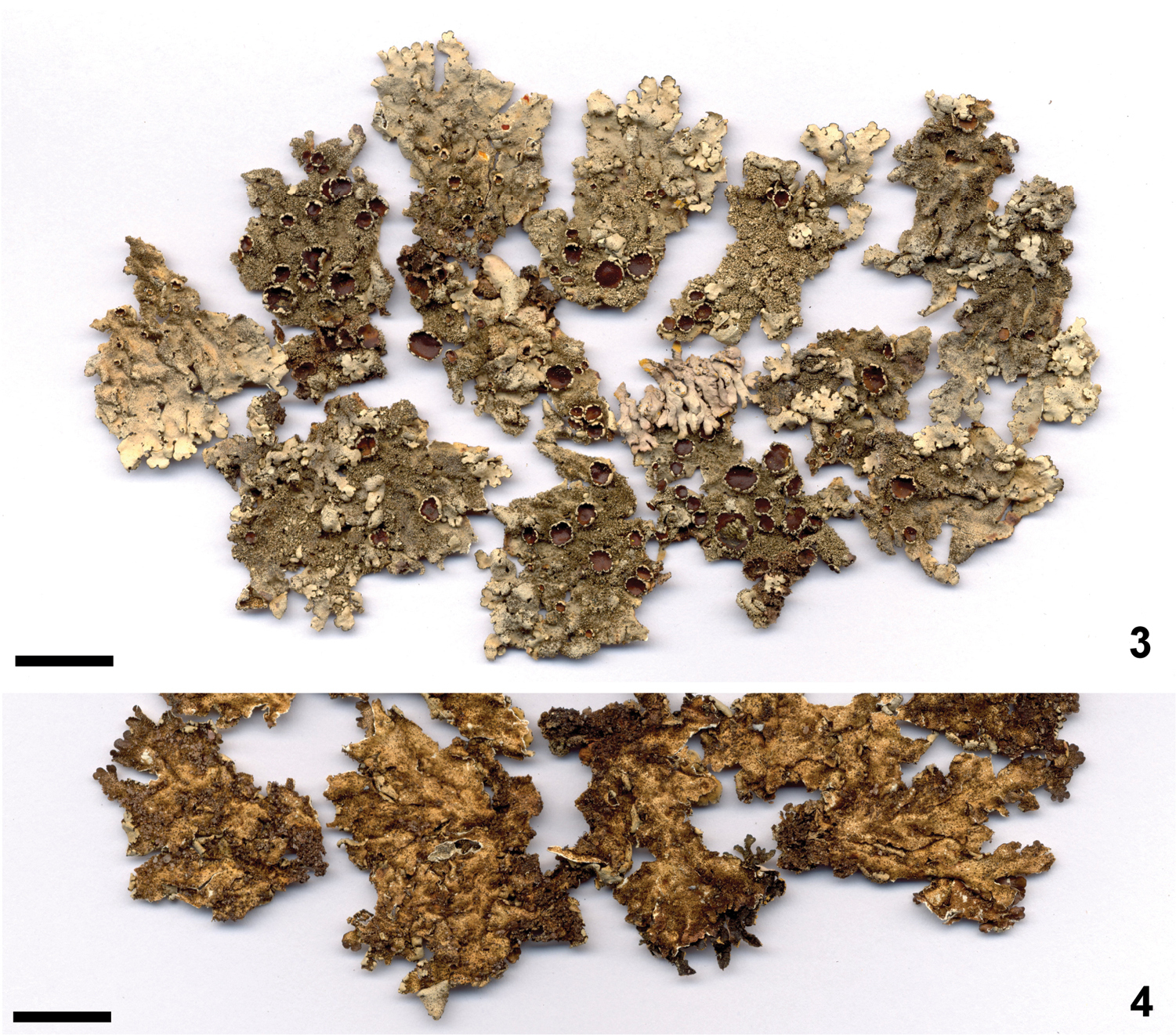
- Holotype of B. cinerea (from above and below, scale bars are 1 cm)

Scientific classification
- Domain: Eukaryota
- Kingdom: Fungi
- Division: Ascomycota
- Class: Lecanoromycetes
- Order: Lecanorales
- Family: Parmeliaceae
- Genus: Bulbothrix
- Species: B. cinerea

Binomial name
- Bulbothrix cinerea Marcelli & Kalb (2002)

= Bulbothrix cinerea =

Species of fungus

Bulbothrix cinerea is a species of lichenized fungi within the family Parmeliaceae. Among other Bulbothrix species, only B. isidiza has isidia combined with an underside that is light coloured. B. isidiza's laciniae are wider, while its thallus is pale, and contains salazinic acid. In turn, B. ventricosa is larger and a black underside and rhizinae. The African species B. decurtata is an obligately saxicolous lichen, and while similar, it has a dark underside and produces salazinic acid in its medulla. The species' name thus refers to its uncommon dark gray colouration of its thallus.

== Description ==
Bulbothrix cinerea possesses a dark gray thallus and is saxicolous, measuring between 3 and 7 centimetres (1.2 and 2.8 in) wide, being tightly adnate. Its laciniae measure between 0.5 to 2.0 millimetres (0.020 to 0.079 in) wide, being shiny at the apex and laterally overlapping, also adnate. The species' ramification is irregularly dichotomous, with rounded apices, a crenate margin with a black line. It shows cilia that are between 0.1 to 0.4 millimetres (0.0039 to 0.0157 in) long. Lacinules, soredia and pustulae are absent in this species.

Its isidia are abundant, being laminal, cylindrical, irregular in diameter, and slightly inflated in shape. Its medulla is white, with a chestnut-dark brown coloured underside, being rugose, veined and papillate. The rhizinae are light brown, simple and bulbate, measuring between 0.1 and 0.5 mm long. Its apothecia are coronate, about 3 millimetres (0.12 in) in diameter, while the amphithecia are isidiate. It counts with 8 spores per ascus, which are ellipsoid and measure between 10 and 13 millimetres (0.39 and 0.51 in) long and 6 to 7.5 millimetres (0.24 to 0.30 in) wide.

== Habitat ==
This saxicolous species finds itself tightly attached to its substrate and is frequently found on exposed quartzite rocks. It is known from Brazil, including the Espinhaço and Mantiqueira Mountains.
