= D8 motorway (Czech Republic) =

D8 Motorway
- Dálnice D8

Route information
- Part of
- Length: 94 km (58 mi)

Major junctions
- From: D0 in Prague-Březiněves
- I/9 near Zdiby; I/15 I/30 near Lovosice; I/8 near Velemín-Bílinka; R63 E442 near Řehlovice; I/30 near Ústí nad Labem; I/13 near Jílové
- To: A17 border with Germany

Location
- Country: Czech Republic
- Regions: Prague, Central Bohemian, Ústí nad Labem
- Major cities: Prague, Ústí nad Labem

Highway system
- Highways in the Czech Republic
← D7	→ D10

D8 motorway (Czech: Dálnice D8) is a motorway in the Central and North Bohemian regions of the Czech Republic. It connects Prague through Ústí nad Labem with the German border at Petrovice and the Bundesautobahn 17 at Bad Gottleuba, leading to Dresden. It forms part of the major European route E55 and the Pan-European Corridor IV.

== History ==
The motorway basically follows the route of an ancient road called the Serbian Trail, which connected Prague with Saxony and the Serbian Lusatia, which crossed the Ore Mountains at the Nakléřovský Pass.

=== World War II ===
Prague - Dresden motorway first appeared on the plans in October 1938, just a few weeks after the Munich Agreement. In the Sudeto - German plans of 1938 - 1945, the present D8 was marked as the A72; in the Czech, and later, protectorate plans, as motorway corridor IV. However, construction did not start because priority was given to another motorway.

On 23 December 1938, the General Directorate of Highway Construction (DGHK) was established and the term motorway was officially introduced.

On 30 April 1942, a ban was issued on the construction of motorways throughout the Greater German Reich, which included the Protectorate of Bohemia and Moravia, due to the transfer of labour to war production. Construction in this direction did not start again even after the end of the war. The plan to build the Prague-Dresden motorway as Corridor IV remained in Czechoslovak plans until December 1950.

=== Present day ===
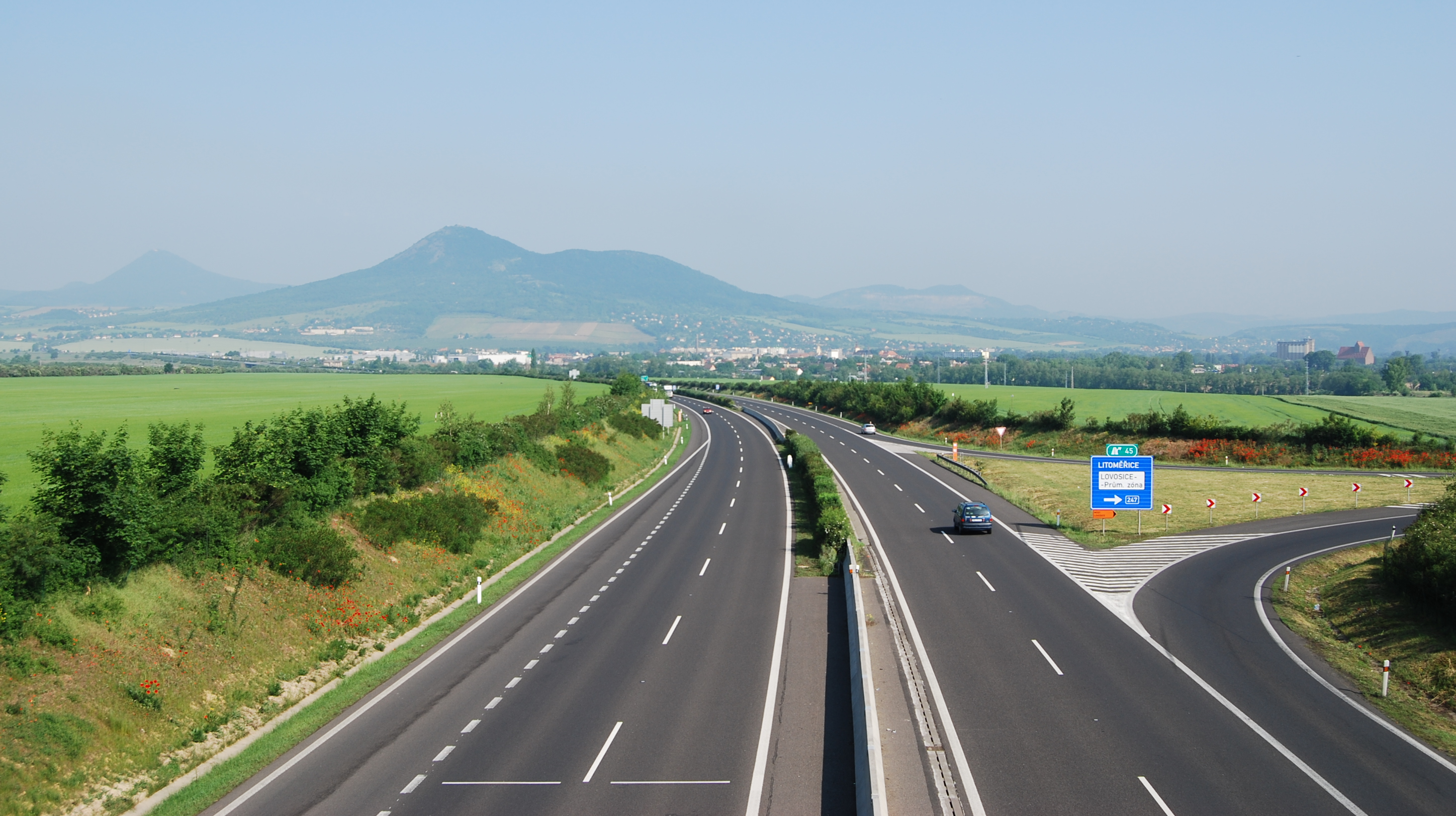
Lovosice junction

The first sections of the highway running 45 km (28 mi) from the Prague Ring to the Lovosice junction were opened between 1990 and 2000; the northwestern segment leading 23 km (14 mi) from Ústí nad Labem to the German border was completed on 21 December 2006, including the longest tunnel in the Czech Republic, the 2,058 m (6,752 ft) long Panenská tunnel. Another 5 km (3.1 mi) long section from Ústí nad Labem to Řehlovice was opened in 1988 in the course of the construction of the R63 expressway.

Works on remaining 16 km (9.9 mi) long segment between Řehlovice and Lovosice were delayed for several years due to numerous protests and appeals by the Děti Země environmental movement against the route taken through the České Středohoří mountain range, a protected landscape area and nature reserve. From the beginning, the project has been also criticized by some geologists, and lately by the National Financial Audit Office for large cost overrun. In 2013, a major landslide buried part of the under-construction highway. Construction work nevertheless continued and the last part of highway was opened in December 2016 albeit with traffic restrictions between Lovosice and Řehlovice.

The restrictions caused by unstable geology; reduced traffic to one lane each on a 2 km (1.2 mi) section. A solution is to reinforce the section with grout which cost 220 million Kč (8.43 million €). The traffic restrictions between Lovosice and Řehlovice were removed on 20 September 2017 following the stabilization of the roadway.

== Route description ==
Country	Region	Location	km	mi	Exit	Name	Destinations	Notes
Czech Republic	Central Bohemian Region	Central Bohemian Region	0	0.0	—		E55	Kilometrage starting point
Czech Republic	Central Bohemian Region	Central Bohemian Region	1	0.62	—	Zdiby	I/9	
Czech Republic	Central Bohemian Region	Central Bohemian Region			Rest area	Odpočívka Klíčany		
Czech Republic	Central Bohemian Region	Central Bohemian Region	9	5.6	—	Úžice		
Czech Republic	Central Bohemian Region	Central Bohemian Region	18	11	—	Nová Ves	I/16	
Czech Republic	Central Bohemian Region	Central Bohemian Region			Rest area	Odpočívka Bříství		
Czech Republic	Ústí nad Labem Region	Ústí nad Labem Region	29	18	—	Roudnice		
Czech Republic	Ústí nad Labem Region	Ústí nad Labem Region	35	22	—	Doksany		
Czech Republic	Ústí nad Labem Region	Ústí nad Labem Region			Rest area	Odpočívka Siřejovice		
Czech Republic	Ústí nad Labem Region	Ústí nad Labem Region	45	28	—	Lukavec		
Czech Republic	Ústí nad Labem Region	Ústí nad Labem Region	48	30	—	Lovosice, Most	I/15 I/30	
Czech Republic	Ústí nad Labem Region	Ústí nad Labem Region	52	32	—	Bílinka/Velemín		
Czech Republic	Ústí nad Labem Region	Ústí nad Labem Region	64	40	—	Řehlovice	I/63 E442	
Czech Republic	Ústí nad Labem Region	Ústí nad Labem Region	69	43	—	Trmice	E442	
Czech Republic	Ústí nad Labem Region	Ústí nad Labem Region	72	45	—	Předlice		
Czech Republic	Ústí nad Labem Region	Ústí nad Labem Region	74	46		Úžín	I/30	
Czech Republic	Ústí nad Labem Region	Ústí nad Labem Region			Rest area	Odpočívka Varvažov		
Czech Republic	Ústí nad Labem Region	Ústí nad Labem Region	80	50	—	Knínice	I/13	
Czech Republic	Ústí nad Labem Region	Ústí nad Labem Region	87	54	—	Petrovice		
Czech Republic	Ústí nad Labem Region	Ústí nad Labem Region	92	57	Czech Republic–Germany border	Krásný Les/Breitenau border crossing	A 17 E55	Kilometrage end point Border crossing; motorway continues as German A17
1.000 mi = 1.609 km; 1.000 km = 0.621 mi: Route transition

== Images ==
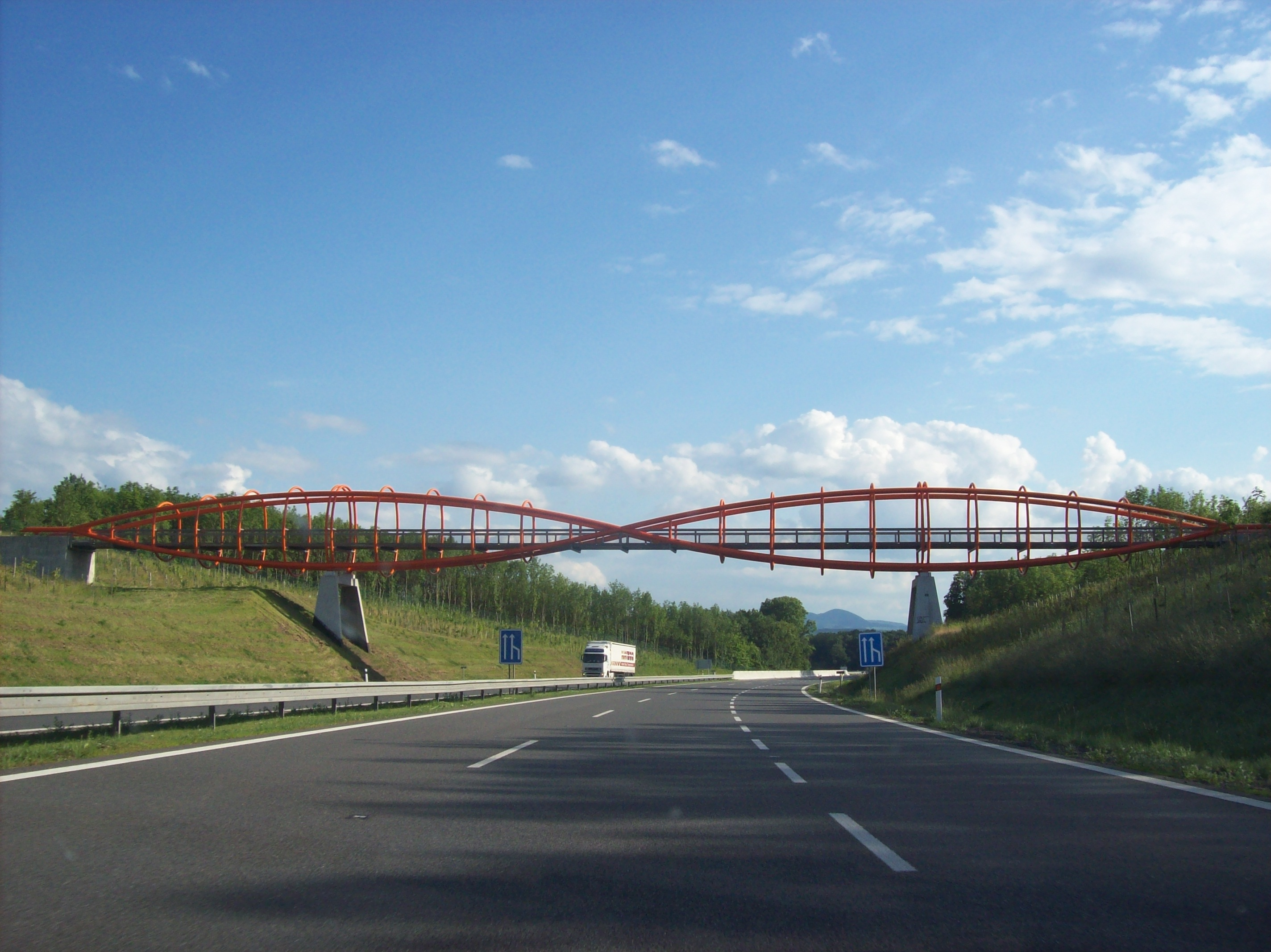
Motorway D8, foot bridge Kočičí oči (Cat Eyes).

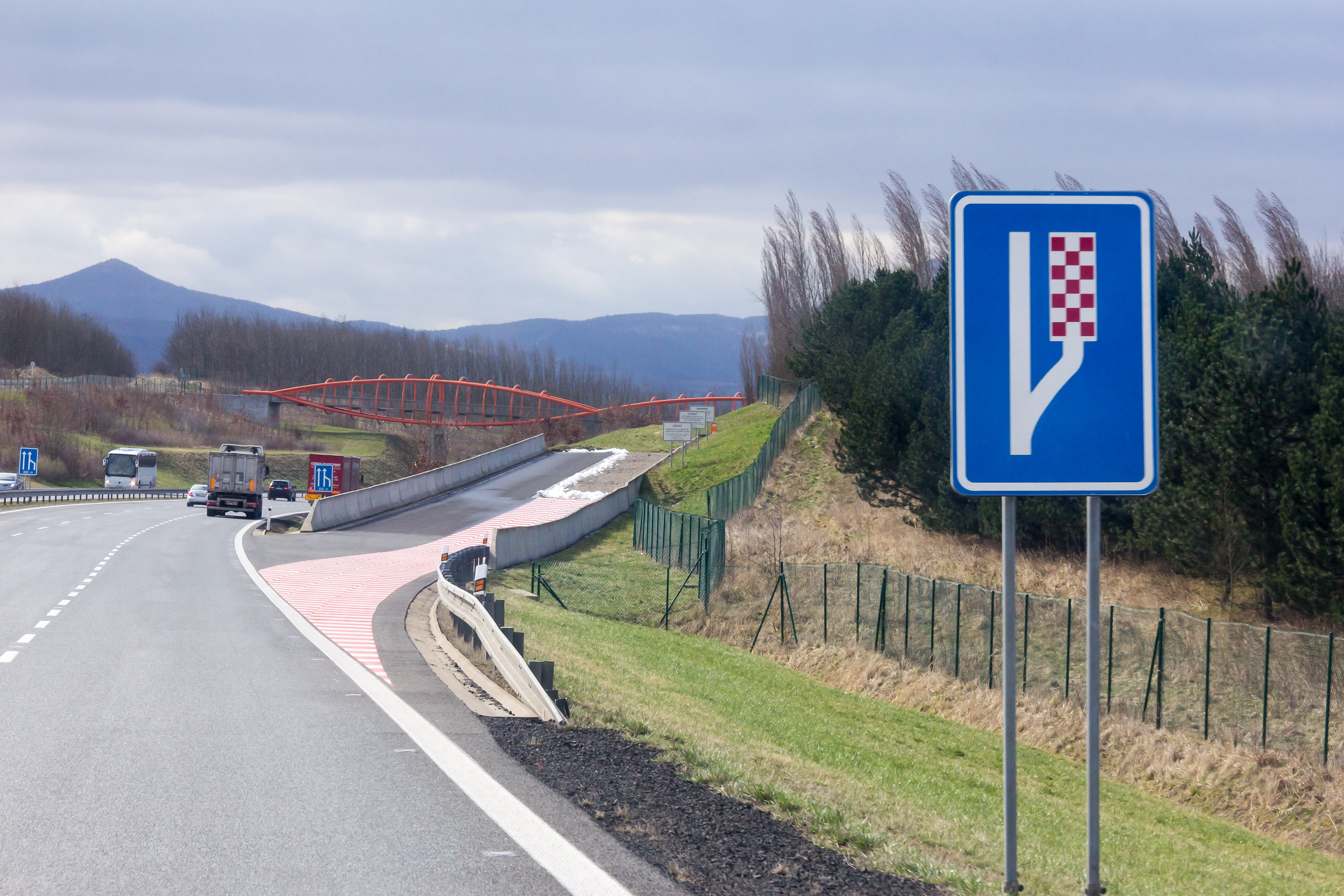
Emergency stopping lane on D8 near Petrovice.

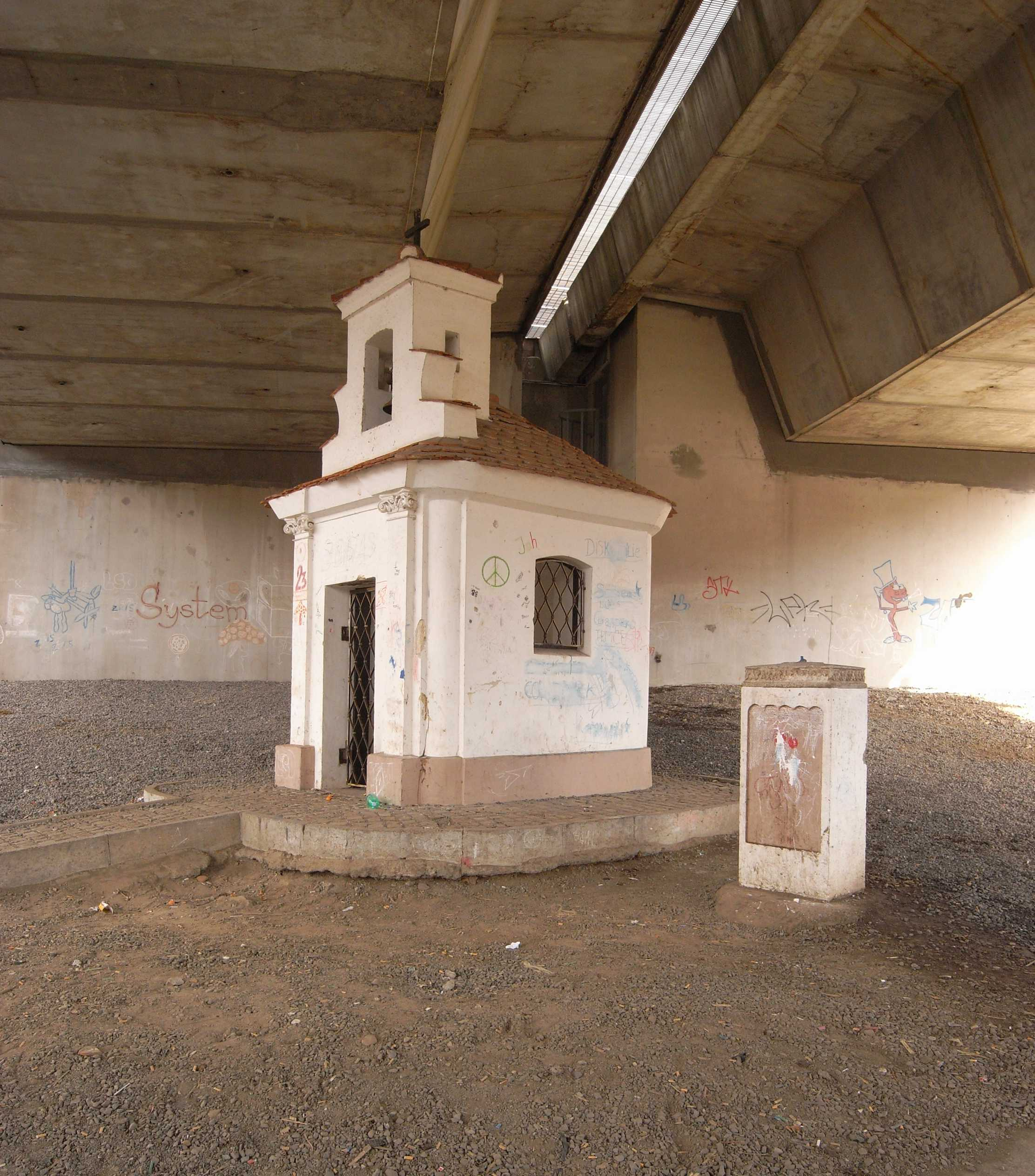
Small chapel "Virgin Mary" (1820) in Trmice-Koštov under D8 motorway.

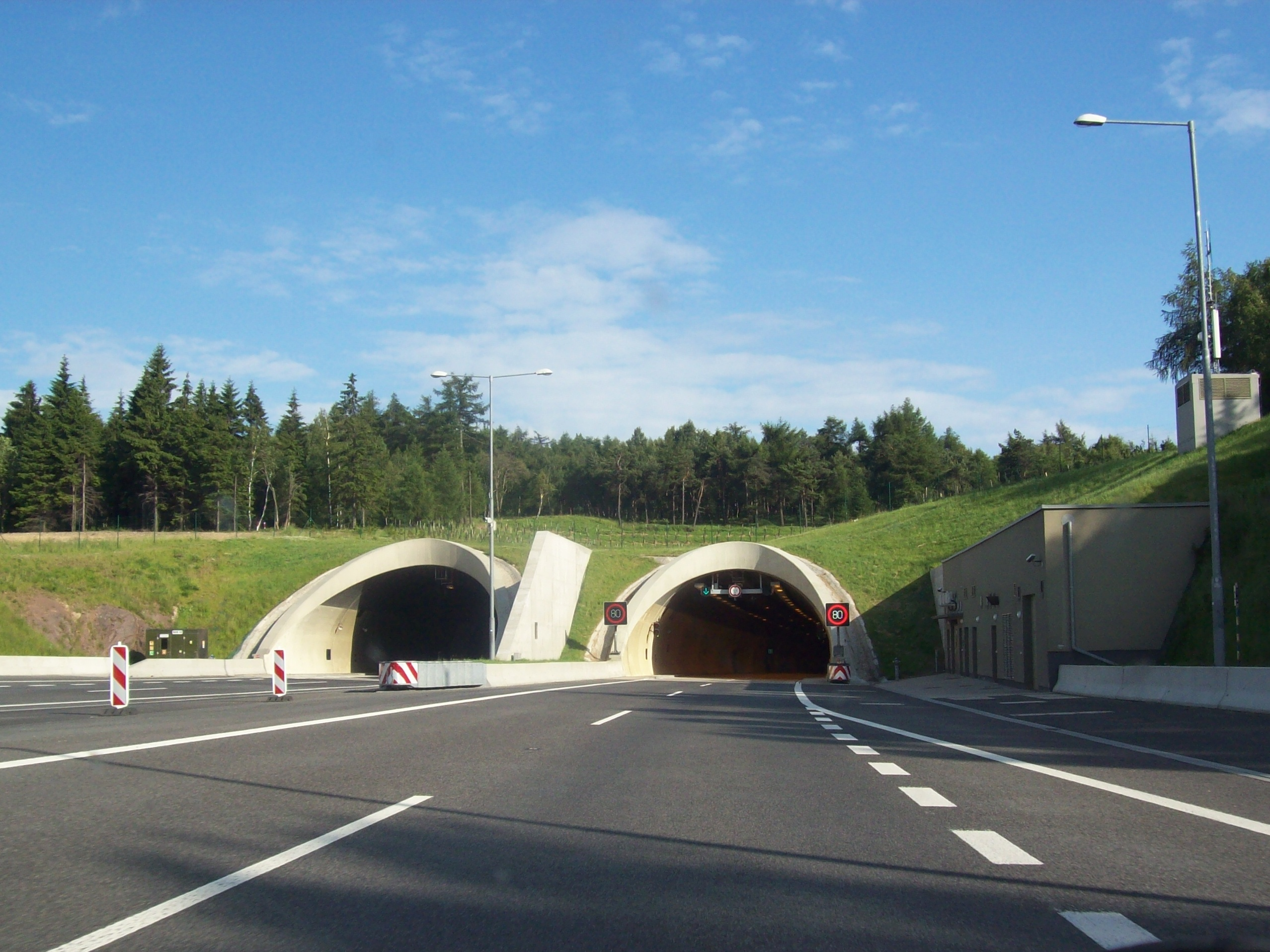
Panenská tunnel (2.1 km (1.3 mi)).

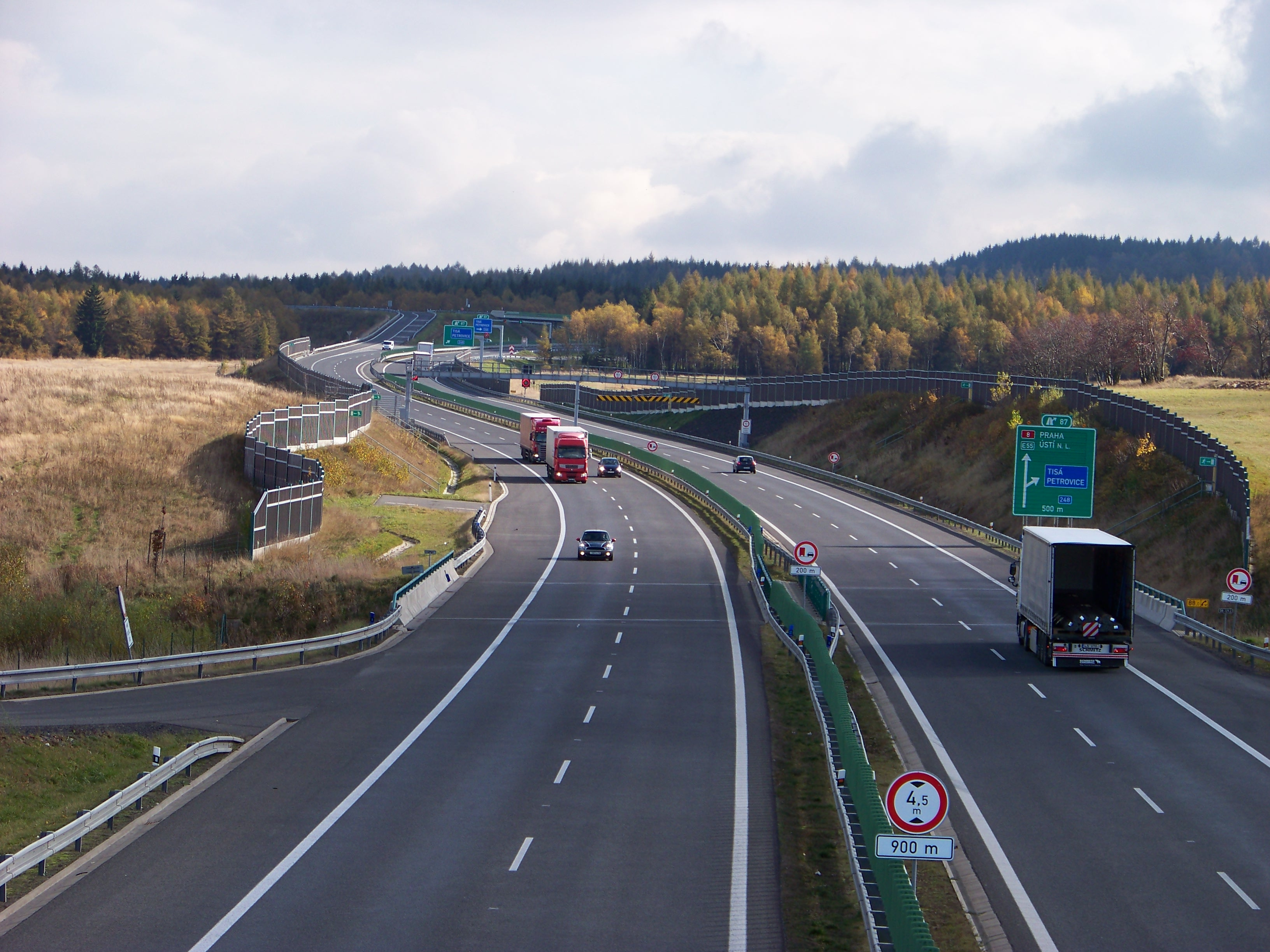
Motorway D8, Krásný Les

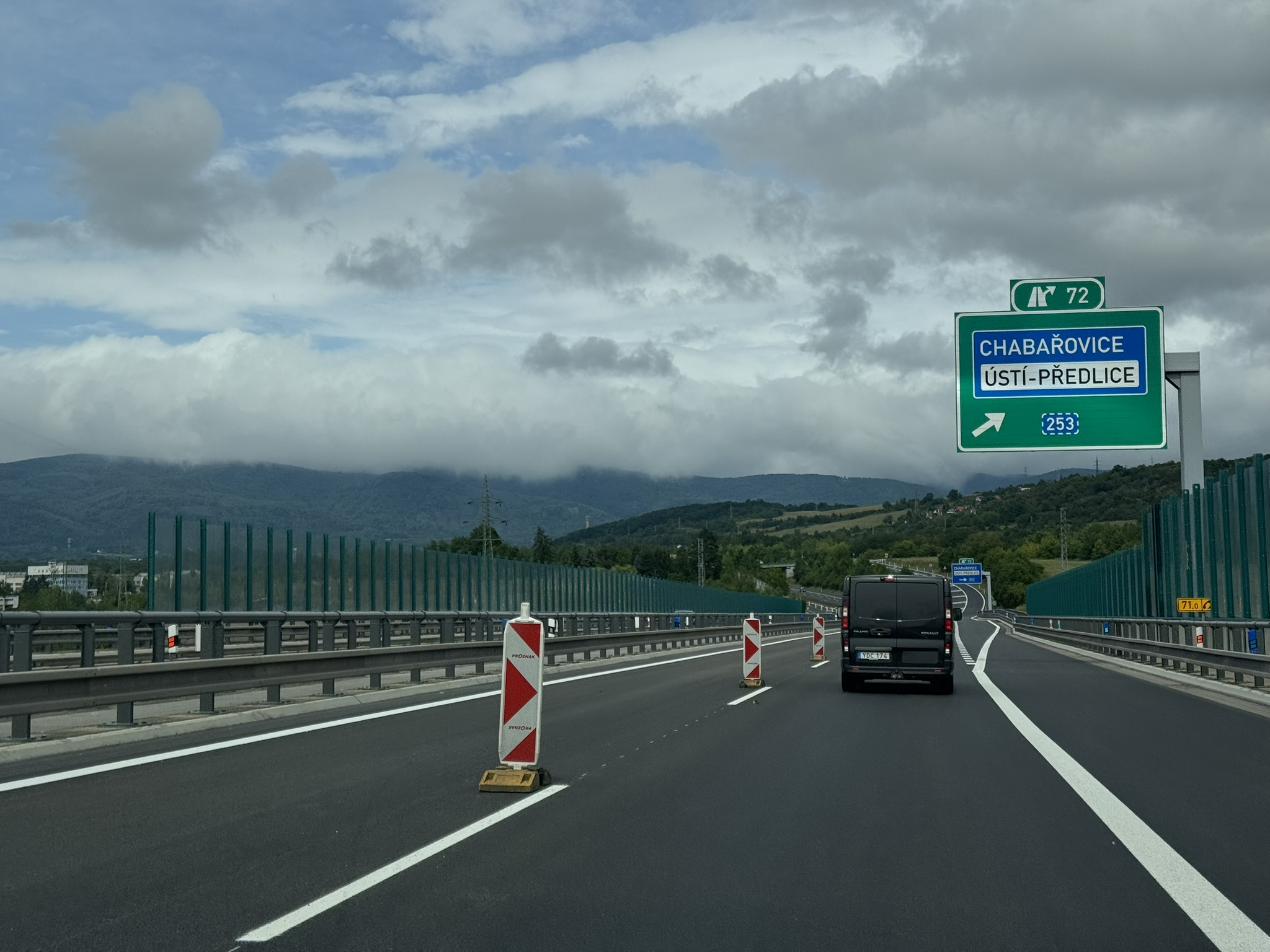
Exit 72 near Ústí nad Labem
