= R63 expressway (Czech Republic) =

Road in the Czech Republic

Expressway R63
- Rychlostní silnice R63
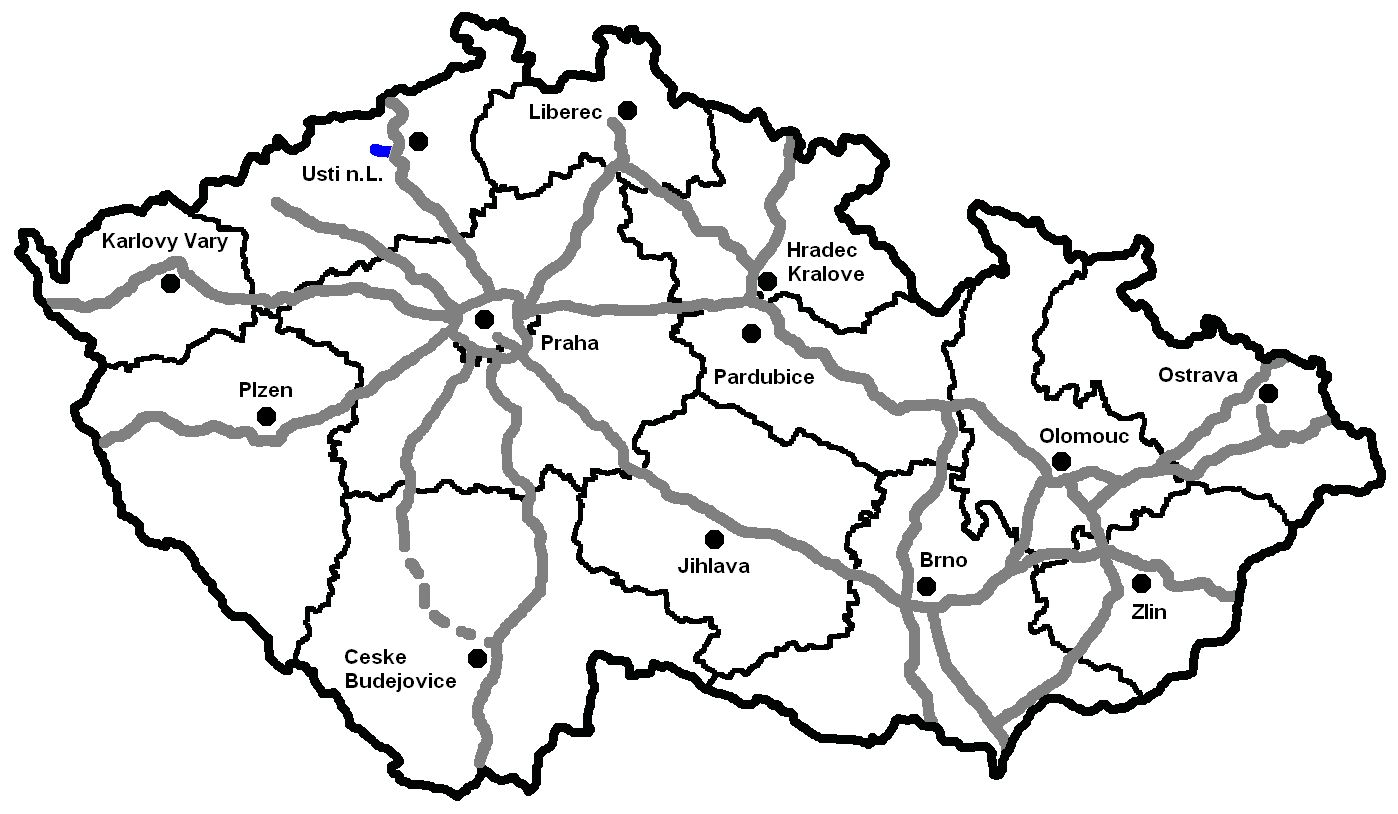

Route information
- Length: 7 km (4.3 mi)
- Status: Downgraded to I/63
- Existed: 1988–2016

Major junctions
- From: Village of Bystřany near Teplice
- To: Junction with D8

Location
- Country: Czech Republic
- Regions: Ústí nad Labem
- Major cities: Teplice

Highway system
- Highways in the Czech Republic

Expressway R63 (Czech: Rychlostní silnice R63) is an expressway in northern Czech Republic. It is completed on the entire length and it serves as a feeder to the D8 motorway. In 2016, R63 was reclassified as I/63.
