= Reichsanstalt für Film und Bild in Wissenschaft und Unterricht =

The Reichsanstalt für Film und Bild in Wissenschaft und Unterricht (English: Reich Institute for Film and Images in Science and the Classroom), before 1940 known as the Reichsstelle für den Unterrichtsfilm (English: Reich Office for Teaching Films) was a branch of the Reich Ministry of Science, Education and Culture which was charged with the creation of educational films in Nazi Germany. The office was founded on June 26, 1934, and was headed by Kurt Gauger, a member of the Nazi SA and the Volkssturm.

By 1944 the Reichsanstalt had produced some 900 films; over 270 of them were for schools, the rest were for research and teaching purposes at universities. A total of more than half a million film copies were delivered. How many of these films were actually used is unclear. The office also served as a lender for teaching media such as films and light pictures as well as for demonstration devices. In 1943, there were 36 provincial authorities and 1243 administrative centers in the occupied territories. It also edited a series of media pedagogical writings and from 1935 to 1943 also the magazine Film und Bild in Wissenschaft, Bildung und Volksbildung.

On Feb. 6, 1935 a "Abteilung Hochschule" - university division - was established within the Reichsstelle, and in 1936 it absorbed the Deutsche Gesellschaft für wissenschaftliche Filme. In December 1945, the Institut für Film und Bild in Wissenschaft und Unterricht (FWU) was founded as a successor organization immediately after the capture of the inventory by US soldiers. The division into district areas was maintained.
