= Velemín =

- Municipality
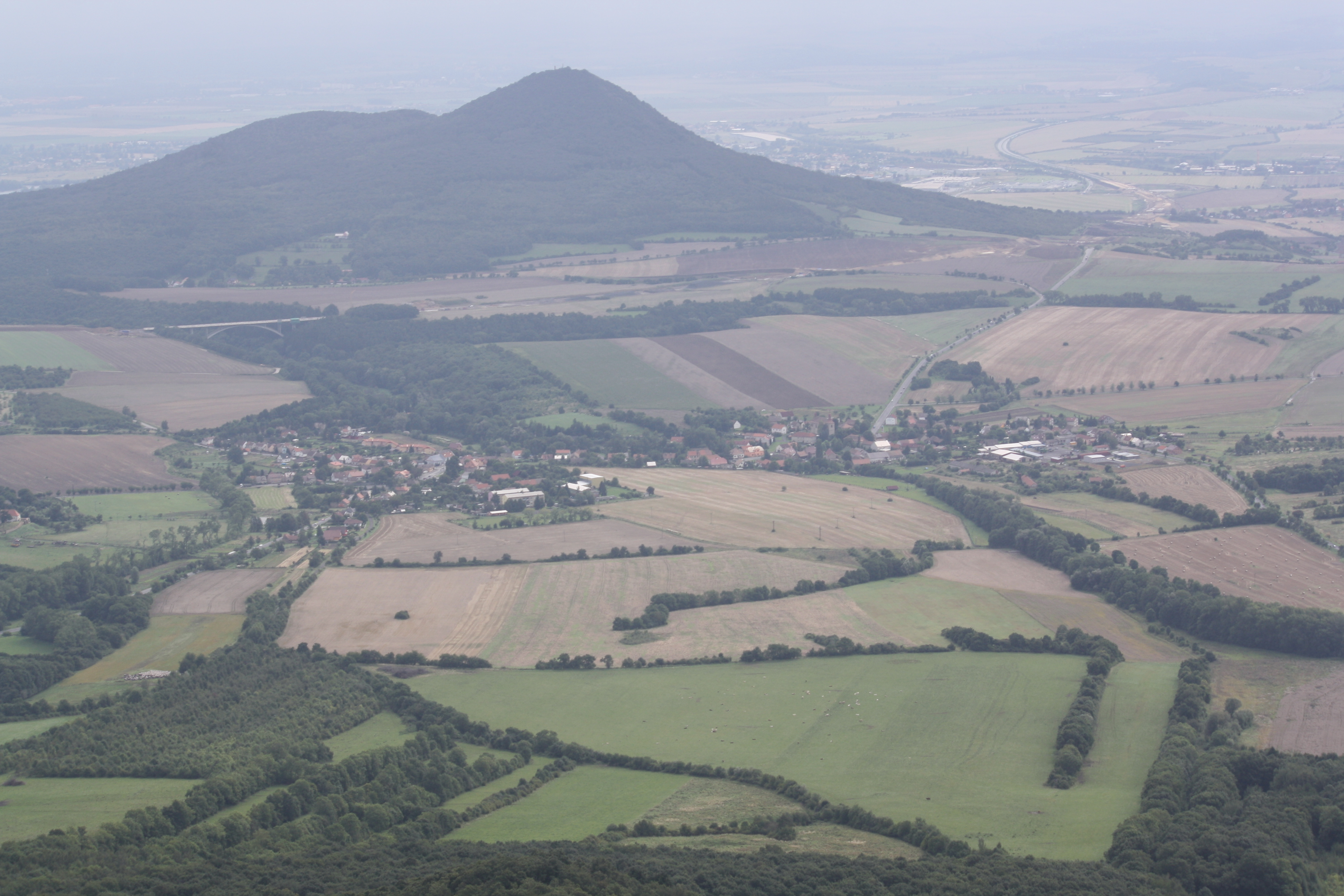
- Velemín as seen from Milešovka

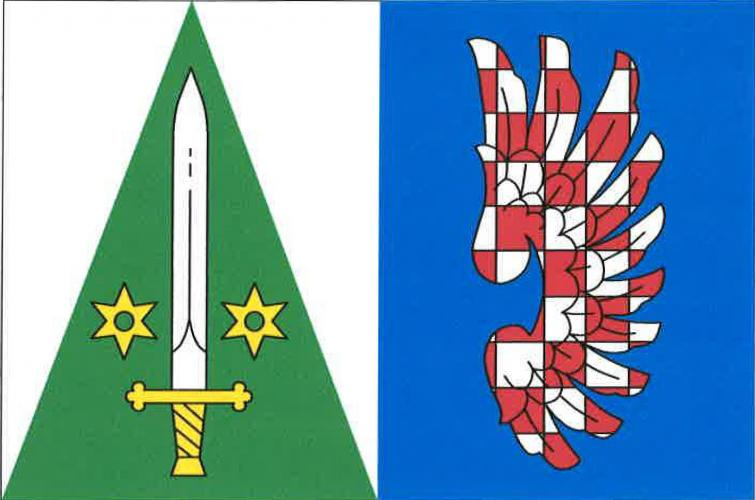
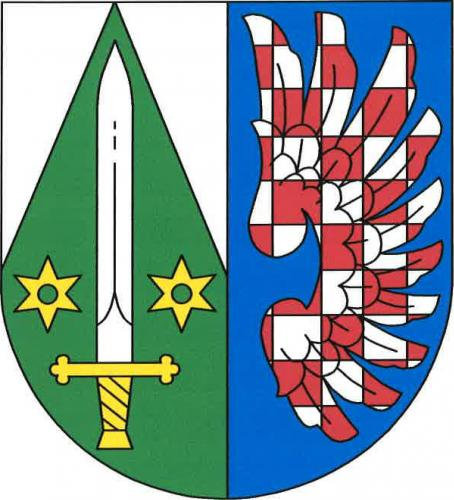
- Flag Coat of arms

- Location in the Czech Republic
- Coordinates: 50°32′21″N 13°58′37″E
- Country: Czech Republic
- Region: Ústí nad Labem
- District: Litoměřice
- First mentioned: 1228

Area
  - Total: 40.24 km^{2} (15.54 sq mi)
- Elevation: 287 m (942 ft)

Population (2026-01-01)
  - Total: 1,722
  - Density: 42.79/km^{2} (110.8/sq mi)
- Time zone: UTC+1 (CET)
  - Summer (DST): UTC+2 (CEST)
- Postal codes: 410 02, 411 31, 411 32
- Website: www.velemin.cz

Velemín (German: Wellemin) is a municipality and village in Litoměřice District in the Ústí nad Labem Region of the Czech Republic. It has about 1,700 inhabitants.

Velemín lies approximately 11 kilometres (7 mi) west of Litoměřice, 14 km (9 mi) south-west of Ústí nad Labem, and 61 km (38 mi) north-west of Prague.

== Administrative division ==
Velemín consists of 11 municipal parts (in brackets population according to the 2021 census):

- Velemín (645)
- Bílinka (58)
- Bílý Újezd (169)
- Boreč (39)
- Březno (106)
- Dobkovičky (95)
- Hrušovka (33)
- Kletečná (31)
- Milešov (316)
- Oparno (129)
- Režný Újezd (60)

== Demographics ==
Historical population
Year	Pop.	±%
1869	2,654	—
1880	2,620	−1.3%
1890	2,523	−3.7%
1900	2,592	+2.7%
1910	2,523	−2.7%
1921	2,604	+3.2%
1930	2,895	+11.2%
1950	1,989	−31.3%
1961	2,017	+1.4%
1970	1,779	−11.8%
1980	1,538	−13.5%
1991	1,300	−15.5%
2001	1,396	+7.4%
2011	1,502	+7.6%
2021	1,681	+11.9%
Source: Censuses

== Notable people ==
- Josef Anders (1863–1936), botanist and lichenologist
