= Josef Anders =

Czech lichenologist

- Born: 10 January 1863; Kletečná, Bohemia, Austrian Empire
- Died: 28 April 1936 (aged 73); Česká Lípa, Czechoslovakia
- Scientific career
- Fields: Botany, lichenology
- Author abbrev. (botany): Anders

Josef Anders (10 January 1863 – 28 April 1936) was a Czech botanist and lichenologist.

== Biography ==
Josef Anders was born in Kletečná, Bohemia, Austrian Empire (now part of Velemín in the Czech Republic), on 10 January 1863. After graduating from high school in Litoměřice, he decided to teach and in 1885 began teaching at a primary school in Hrušovany near Litoměřice, later in Pertoltice pod Ralskem. From 1887 he worked in Česká Lípa as a German teacher at a burgher girls 'school (becoming director in 1919), later also as a professional teacher for boys' burghers. He had a keen interest in history and nature, and in 1890–1892 he wrote a guide to the historical monuments of the Central Bohemian Uplands and Upper Lusatia. He was encouraged in this activity by botanist and high school professor Franz Wurm. Around this time he began to collect and publish lichens from the vicinity of Česká Lípa. He educated himself in the natural sciences, gradually devoting himself more and more to systematic botany and lichen taxonomy.

As a lichenologist he contributed mostly to the research of the Central Bohemian Uplands, the Lusatian Mountains, Jizera Mountains, Ore Mountains, and the Giant Mountains. After he retired in 1926, Anders devoted himself fully to lichens. It was then that he completed his most famous work, Die Strauch und Laubflechten Mitteleuropas. In his obituary of Anders, German bryologist Karl von Schoenau wrote that this work "brought him the well-deserved recognition of his many years of scientific work and made his name known far beyond the borders of his homeland". He also traveled to mountains in neighbouring countries to collect lichens, including the Alps, High Tauern – Grossglockner, and High Tatras. He documented more than 70 lichens from the Jizera Mountains and its surroundings in the early 1920s, many of which can no longer be found there today due to changes in habitat and climate. He was once one of Europe's greatest experts on the genus Cladonia. He befriended the German lichenologist Heinrich Sandstede, who wrote a monograph on the family Cladoniaceae. In addition to almost fifty professional publications, he published 333 items in the Exsiccata Lichenes exsiccati Bohemiae borealis (Flechten Nordböhmen) in six volumes over four years (1929–1933).

Two lichens that were named after him are Pertusaria multipuncta var. andersiana Erichsen (1934) and Usnea andersiana Nádv. (1956). According to Vitus Grummann, Anders described 7 new species, 4 varieties, and 81 forms.

== Selected publications ==
- Anders, J. (1923). "Zur Flechtenflora des Isergebirges" [On the lichen flora of the Jizera Mountains]. Hedwigia (in German). 64: 256–267.
- Anders, J. (1923). "Zur Flechtenflora des Isergebirges. Nachtrag" [On the lichen flora of the Jizera Mountains. Addendum]. Hedwigia (in German). 65: 65–84.
- Anders, J. (1926). "Zur Flechtenflora der Umbebung von Krimml in Salzburg" [On the lichen flora in the vicinity of Krimml in Salzburg]. Hedwigia (in German). 66: 103–126.
- Anders, J. (1928). "Untersuchungen über Mycoblastus sanguinarius (L.) Norm., M. alpinus (Fr.) Kernst. und M. melinus (Krph.) Hellb". Hedwigia (in German). 68: 87–92.
- Anders, J. (1930). "Über eine neue Flechtenart: Cladonia magyarica Vainio s.sp" [About a new species of lichen: Cladonia magyarica Vainio s.sp.]. Archiv für Protistenkunde (in German). 71: 499–501.
