= Bulbothrix sipmanii =

Scientific classification
- Domain: Eukaryota
- Kingdom: Fungi
- Division: Ascomycota
- Class: Lecanoromycetes
- Order: Lecanorales
- Family: Parmeliaceae
- Genus: Bulbothrix
- Species: B. sipmanii

Binomial name
- Bulbothrix sipmanii Aptroot & Aubel (1999)

Species of lichen

Bulbothrix sipmanii is a species of lichen in the family Parmeliaceae. Found in Guyana, it was formally described as a new species in 1999 by André Aptroot and Robert van Aubel. The species epithet sipmanii honours Dutch lichenologist Harrie Sipman.
