= I/13 highway (Czech Republic) =

Road in the Czech Republic

Expressway R13
- Rychlostní silnice R13
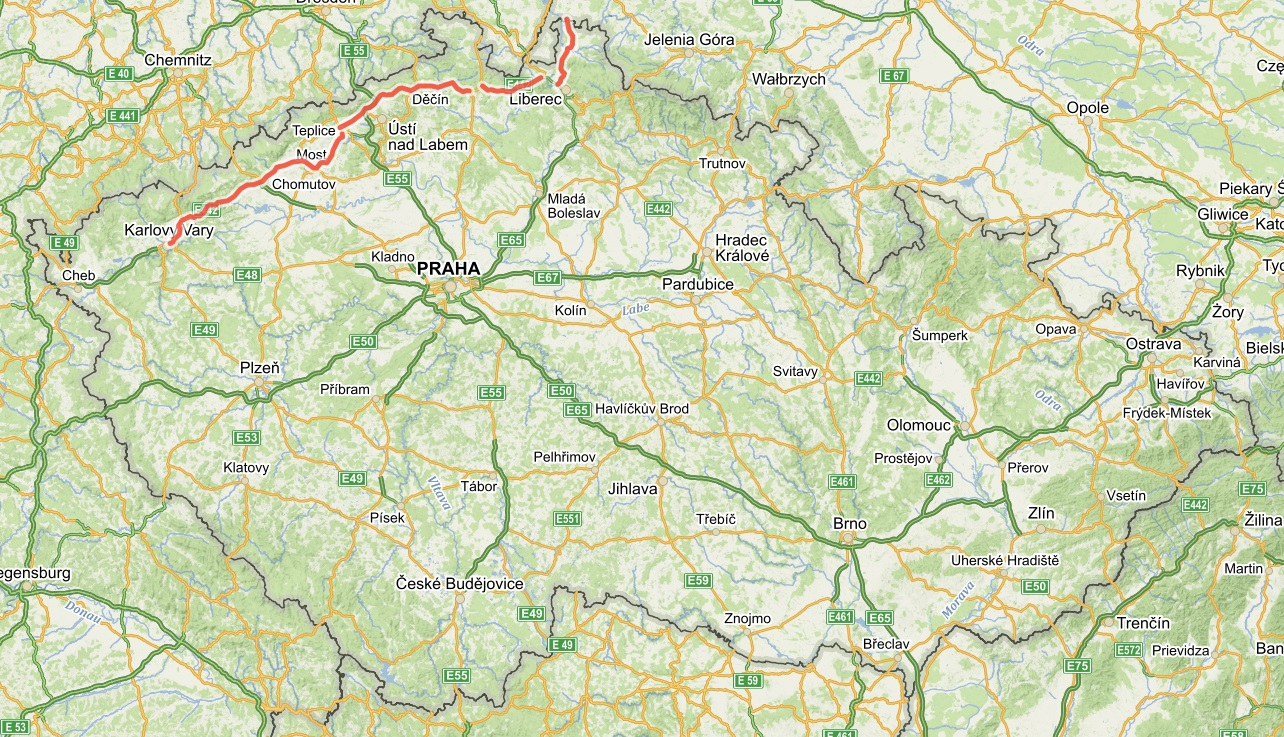

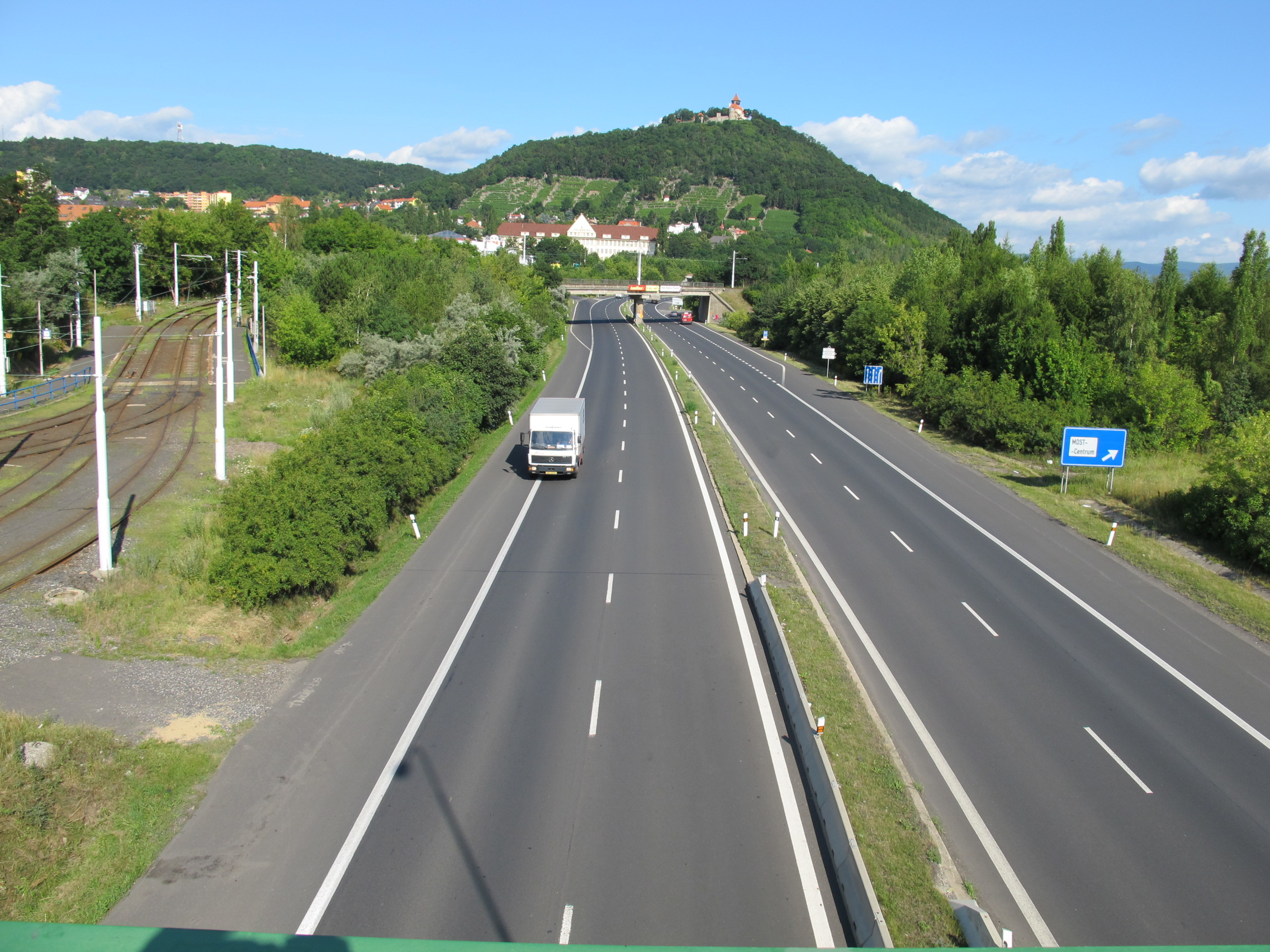
- I/13 highway in Most

Route information
- Length: 218.459 km (135.744 mi)

Major junctions
- From: I/6 in Karlovy Vary
- To: Polish border at Habartice

Location
- Country: Czech Republic

Highway system
- Highways in the Czech Republic

The I/13 highway (Czech: Silnice I/13) is a highway located in northwestern Czech Republic. The route leads through the Karlovy Vary, Ústí nad Labem and Liberec Regions. The road starts in Karlovy Vary at the intersection with road I/6 and ends at the Habartice/Zawidów border crossing with Poland. It has a length of 218.459 km (135.744 mi).

== Route ==
The I/13 highway passes through the following cities and towns:

Karlovy Vary region

- Karlovy Vary
- Ostrov

Ústí nad Labem Region

- Klášterec nad Ohří
- Chomutov
- Most
- Bílina
- Teplice
- Děčín

Liberec Region

- Nový Bor, here it intersects with road I/9 from Prague
- Cvikov
- Chrastava
- Liberec
- Frýdlant

== Bridges ==
The road crosses Jeřice in Mníšek via a 12.80 meter long bridge from 1890, which has two arches. During 1999, its reconstruction took place, when the vaults were strengthened using a reinforced concrete plate.

The Smědá in Frýdlanta was crossed by a road over a wooden girder bridge that stood at the end of Máchova Street since 1862. However, it was swept away by a flood in 2010. In the northwest of the city, the road crosses over Řasnica along a 9.60-meter-long one arched bridge with a stone parapet wall.

In Arnoltice, the road crosses the Bulovský stream on a bridge with two arches. It was built in 1880 and during the reconstruction it was strengthened by an inserted reinforced concrete slab with cantilever cornices.
