= Floristic =

Did you mean: "Floristics"?
