= Syrovice =

- Municipality
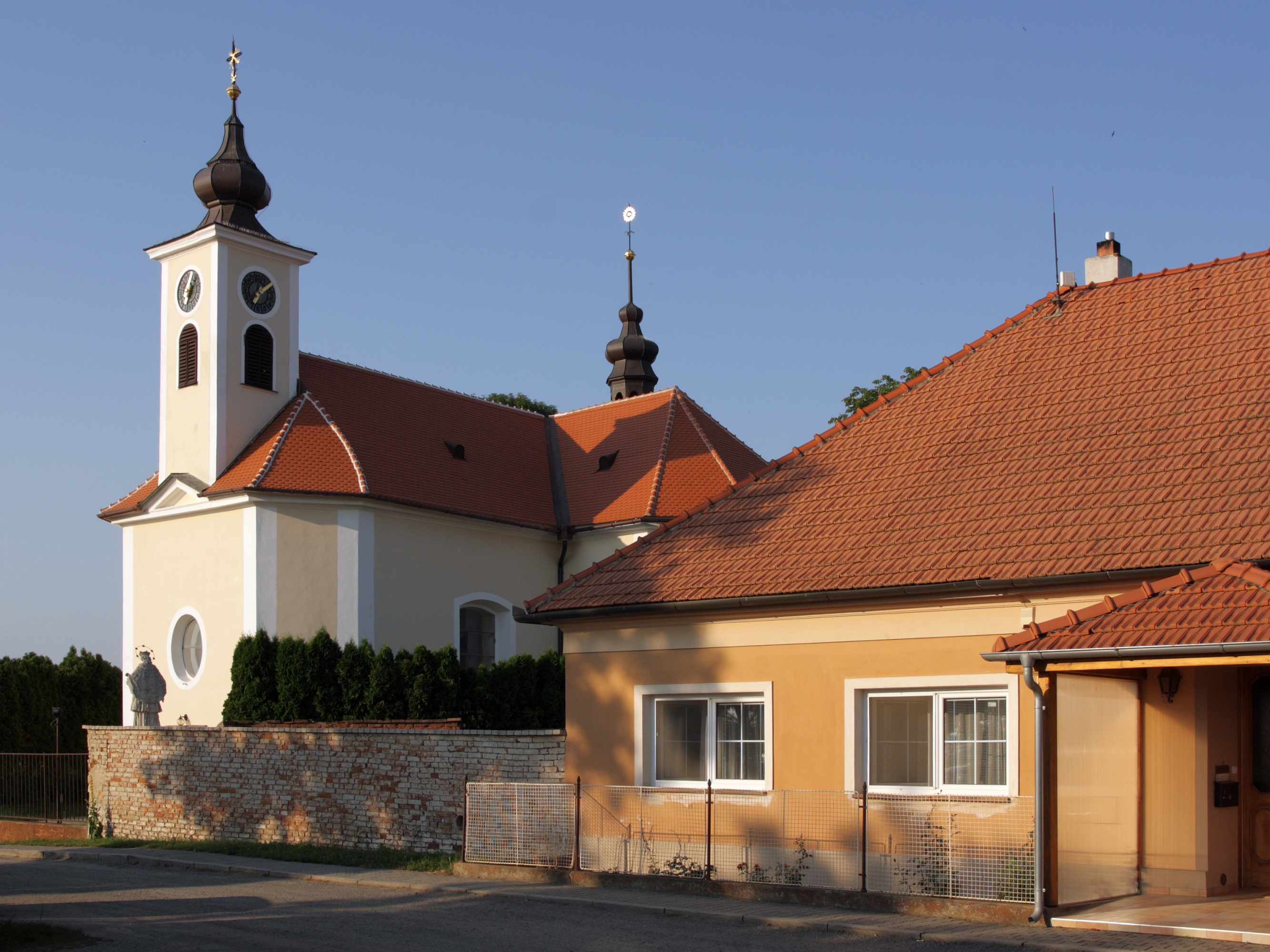
- Church of Saint Augustine

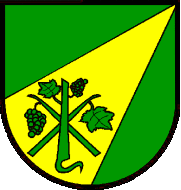
- Flag Coat of arms

- Location in the Czech Republic
- Coordinates: 49°4′47″N 16°32′47″E
- Country: Czech Republic
- Region: South Moravian
- District: Brno-Country
- First mentioned: 1294

Area
  - Total: 8.27 km^{2} (3.19 sq mi)
- Elevation: 202 m (663 ft)

Population (2026-01-01)
  - Total: 2,126
  - Density: 257/km^{2} (666/sq mi)
- Time zone: UTC+1 (CET)
  - Summer (DST): UTC+2 (CEST)
- Postal code: 664 67
- Website: www.syrovice.cz

Syrovice is a municipality and village in Brno-Country District in the South Moravian Region of the Czech Republic. It has about 2,100 inhabitants.

== Geography ==
Syrovice is located about 13 kilometres (8 mi) south of Brno. It lies in a flat agricultural landscape in the Dyje–Svratka Valley.

== History ==
The first written mention of Syrovice is from 1294. Until the establishment of a sovereign municipality in the 19th century, the village was divided into three parts with different owners. One part belonged to the Dolní Kounice estate, one part belonged to the Sokolnice estate and one part belonged to the Hajany estate.

== Demographics ==
Historical population

Year	Pop.	±%
1869	627	—
1880	690	+10.0%
1890	773	+12.0%
1900	835	+8.0%
1910	884	+5.9%

Year	Pop.	±%
1921	906	+2.5%
1930	1,002	+10.6%
1950	1,011	+0.9%
1961	1,096	+8.4%
1970	1,083	−1.2%

Year	Pop.	±%
1980	982	−9.3%
1991	946	−3.7%
2001	971	+2.6%
2011	1,382	+42.3%
2021	1,917	+38.7%

Source: Censuses

== Transport ==
The D52 motorway (part of the European route E461) from Brno to the Czech–Austrian border in Mikulov runs through the municipal territory.

== Sights ==
The main landmark of Syrovice is the Church of Saint Augustine. It was originally a Baroque chapel dating from 1775, extended into the church in 1862.
