= D55 motorway =

Czech motorway

D55 Motorway
- Dálnice D55

Route information
- Length: 27 km (17 mi) Planned: appr. 101 km (63 mi)

Major junctions
- From: D35 near Olomouc
- D1 near Přerov (planned); D1 / D49 near Hulín
- To: D2 near Břeclav

Location
- Country: Czech Republic
- Regions: Olomouc, Zlín, South Moravian
- Major cities: Olomouc, Přerov, Otrokovice, Uherské Hradiště, Hodonín, Břeclav

Highway system
- Highways in the Czech Republic
← D52	→ D56

D55 motorway (Czech: dálnice D55), formerly R55 expressway (Czech: rychlostní silnice R55) is a motorway in the Czech Republic. The D55 will connect Olomouc and bypass Přerov, Hulín and Otrokovice, where the regional town of Zlín will also be connected via the D49. Through the sections around Uherské Hradiště, the D55 will be connected to the D2 near Břeclav in the future.

As of 2023, there were 19 kilometres (12 mi) in operation and 30 kilometres (19 mi) under construction. Since then, over 8 kilometres (5.0 mi) have been opened, bringing the total distance in operation to approximately 27 kilometres (17 mi). When completed, the total length of the D55 motorway will be more than 100 kilometres (62 mi).

== Chronology ==
The motorway was designated as a four-lane H55 on 10 April 1963. The construction of this motorway has been confirmed several times by government resolutions, most recently by a resolution of the government of the Czech Republic of 21 July 1999.

The construction of the north-eastern part of the Otrokovice bypass was the first to start in February 2002 and was put into operation in October 2006. In 2008, two connecting sections around Hulín started to be built and were put into operation as expressways at the end of 2010.

Other sections were already planned as motorways. First, the south-eastern part of the Otrokovice bypass was being built from October 2018 to November 2021, then the sections Babice - Staré Město (from September 2020), Staré Město - Moravský Písek (from August 2021) and Moravský Písek - Bzenec (from September 2022), which were put into operation in 2024. In April 2023, the construction of the Olomouc - Kokory section and the bridge near Napajedla began.

The ~7.6 kilometre section Olomouc - Kokory was put into operation in December of 2025, after being in construction for 32 months, costing about 2 billion CZK.

The 495 metre Napajedla - Babice bridge was also put into operation in December of 2025. It is supposed to resemble the Golden Gate Bridge with its distinct red colour.

=== Future development ===
Construction work on the sections Napajedla - Babice and Kokory - Přerov is scheduled to start in 2026 and their commissioning is planned for 2029. The remaining four sections from Bzenec to Břeclav are to be built in 2028 and commissioned gradually in 2031 and 2032.

== Images ==
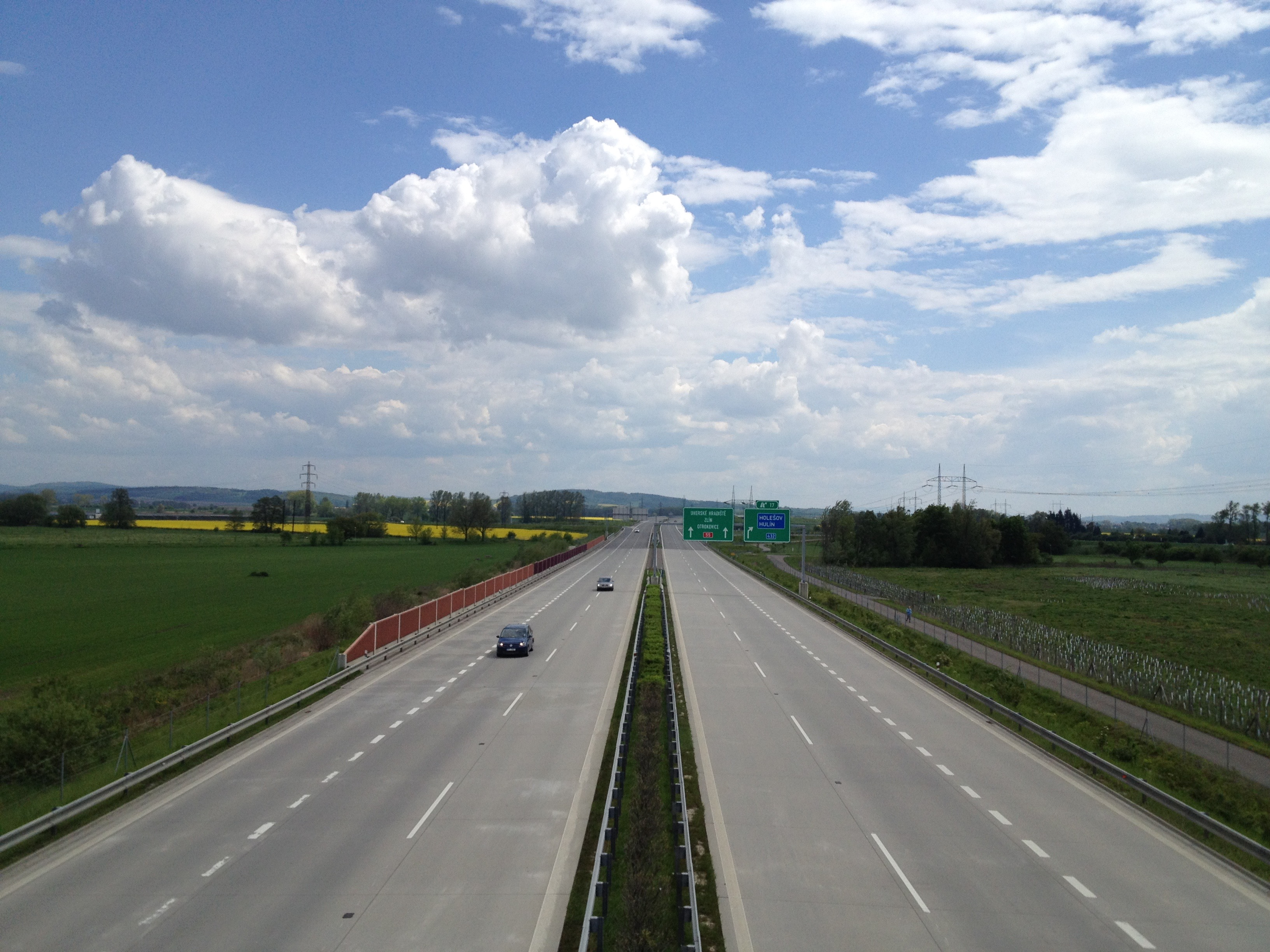
Highway D55 on its 16th kilometer in direction to Břeclav at bridge near Pravčice.

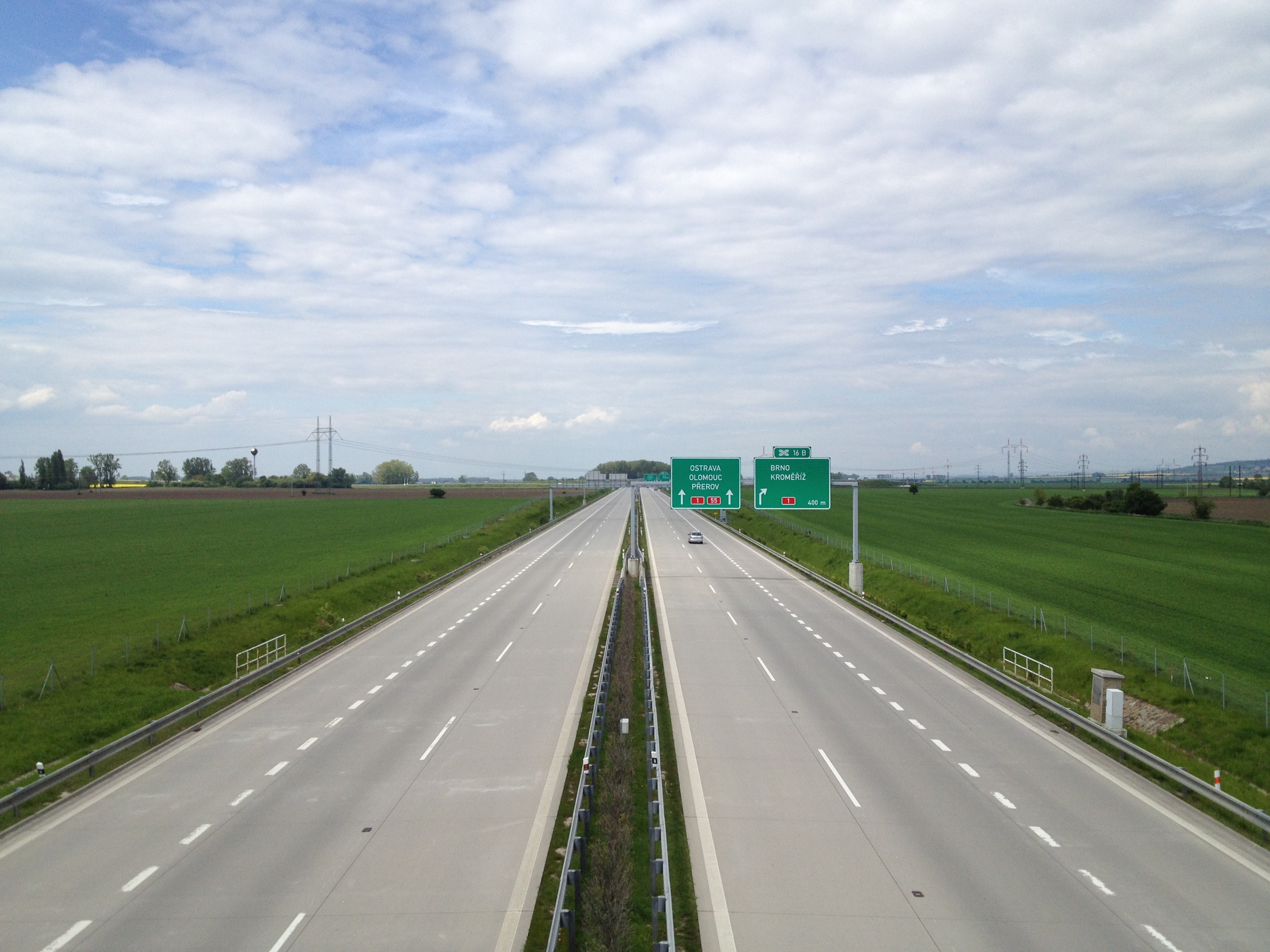
Highway D55 on its 16th kilometer in direction to Olomouc at bridge near Pravčice.
