= Hajany =

Hajany may refer to places in the Czech Republic:

- Hajany (Brno-Country District), a municipality and village in the South Moravian Region
- Hajany (Strakonice District), a municipality and village in the South Bohemian Region
