= R55 =

R55 may refer to:

== Roads ==
- R55 (South Africa), a road
- D55 motorway in the Czech Republic, formerly R55 expressway

== Other uses ==
- R55 (New York City Subway car)
- K-55 (missile), a Soviet air-to-air missile
- Mini Clubman (R55), a car
- R55: Toxic to fauna, a risk phrase
