= D49 road =

D49 road may refer to:

- D49 road (Croatia)
- D49 motorway (Czech Republic)
