= R49 =

R49 may refer to:

- R49 (South Africa), a route
- D49 motorway, formerly R49 expressway, a road in the Czech Republic
- R49 (London Underground car)
- HMS Hercules (R49), an aircraft carrier laid down for the Royal Navy
- R49: May cause cancer by inhalation, a risk phrase
