= Mikulov =

Town in South Moravian Region, Czech Republic

- Town
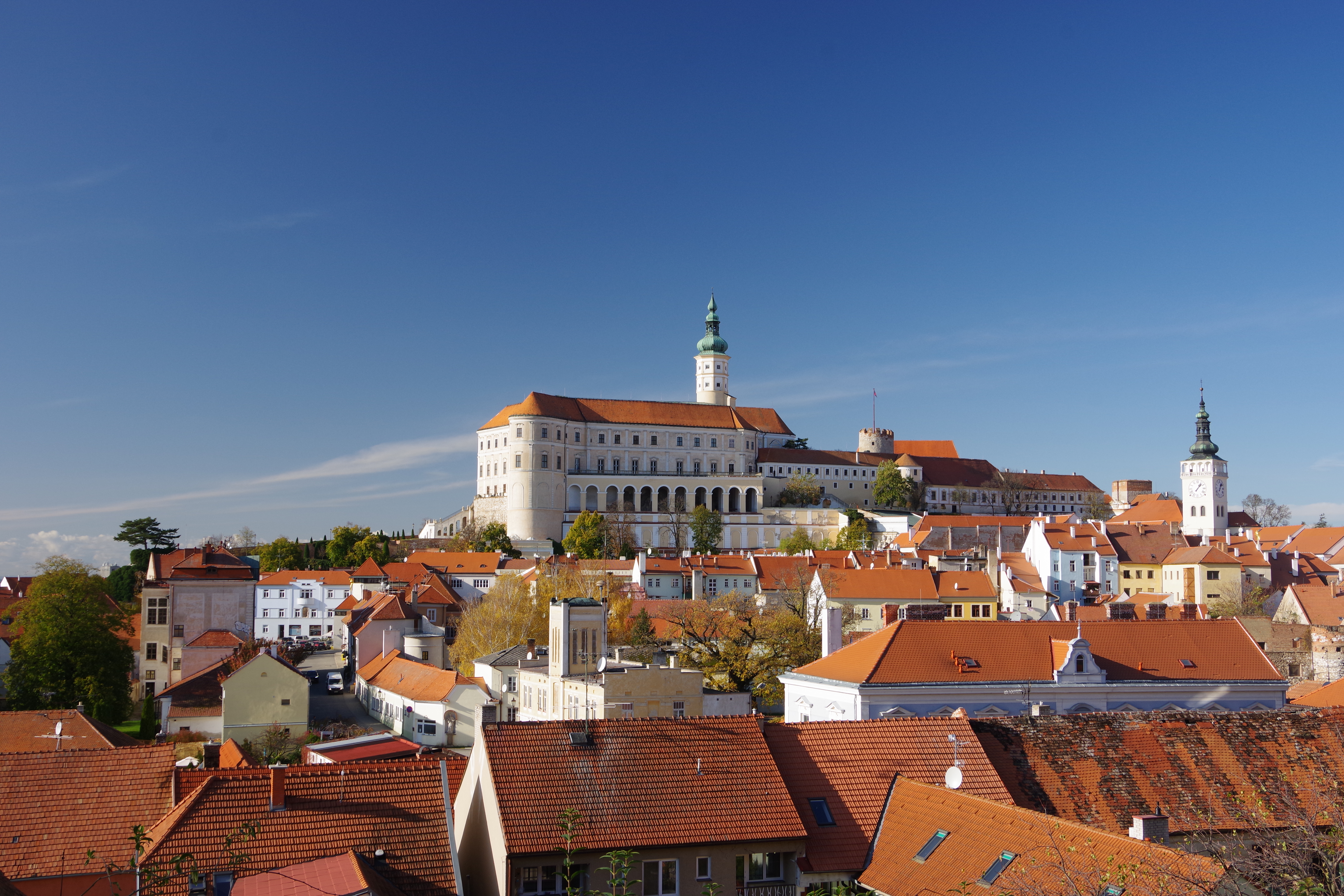
- Old town centre and castle

- Flag Coat of arms

- Location in the Czech Republic
- Coordinates: 48°48′20″N 16°38′16″E
- Country: Czech Republic
- Region: South Moravian
- District: Břeclav
- First mentioned: 1249

Government
  - Mayor: Vojtěch Jedlička

Area
  - Total: 45.32 km^{2} (17.50 sq mi)
- Elevation: 242 m (794 ft)

Population (2026-01-01)
  - Total: 7,552
  - Density: 166.6/km^{2} (431.6/sq mi)
- Time zone: UTC+1 (CET)
  - Summer (DST): UTC+2 (CEST)
- Postal code: 692 01
- Website: www.mikulov.cz

Mikulov (Czech pronunciation: [ˈmɪkulof]; German: Nikolsburg) is a town in Břeclav District in the South Moravian Region of the Czech Republic. It has about 7,600 inhabitants. The town is located on the border with Austria, mainly in the Mikulov Highlands and within the Pálava Protected Landscape Area.

From the 16th to the 19th century, Mikulov was the cultural centre of the Jewish community of Moravia. The historic centre of Mikulov is well preserved and is protected as an urban monument reservation. The most important monument is the pilgrimage area of the hill Svatý kopeček with the Chapel of Saint Sebastian, which is protected as a national cultural monument.

== Etymology ==
The name is derived from the personal name Mikul (an abbreviated form of Mikuláš, which is a Czech variant of Nicholas). In the earliest times, the German name Nikolsburg/Nicolsburg prevailed, which was then Czechised as Nyklspurg and Nyklšpurk. The name Mikulov has been used since the 19th century.

== Geography ==
Mikulov is located about 18 kilometres (11 mi) northwest of Břeclav and 42 km (26 mi) south of Brno, on the border with Austria. It borders the Austrian municipality of Drasenhofen.

Mikulov lies mostly in the Mikulov Highlands, but the municipal territory also extends into the Lower Morava Valley on the east and into the Dyje–Svratka Valley on the west. The highest point is the hill Turold at 385 m (1,263 ft). Most of the municipal territory lies within the Pálava Protected Landscape Area.

The streams Mušlovský potok and Včelínek flow through the municipal territory and supply there a system of fishponds, the largest of which are Nový rybník with an area of 31 ha (77 acres) and Šibeník with an area of 23 ha (57 acres). Another notable body of water is Janičův vrch – a flooded former sandstone quarry, which is protected as a nature monument and occasionally used for swimming.

== History ==
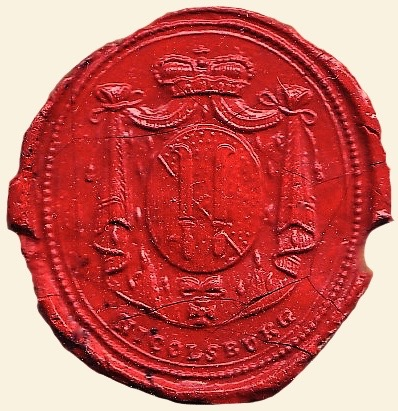
Official seal, 1810

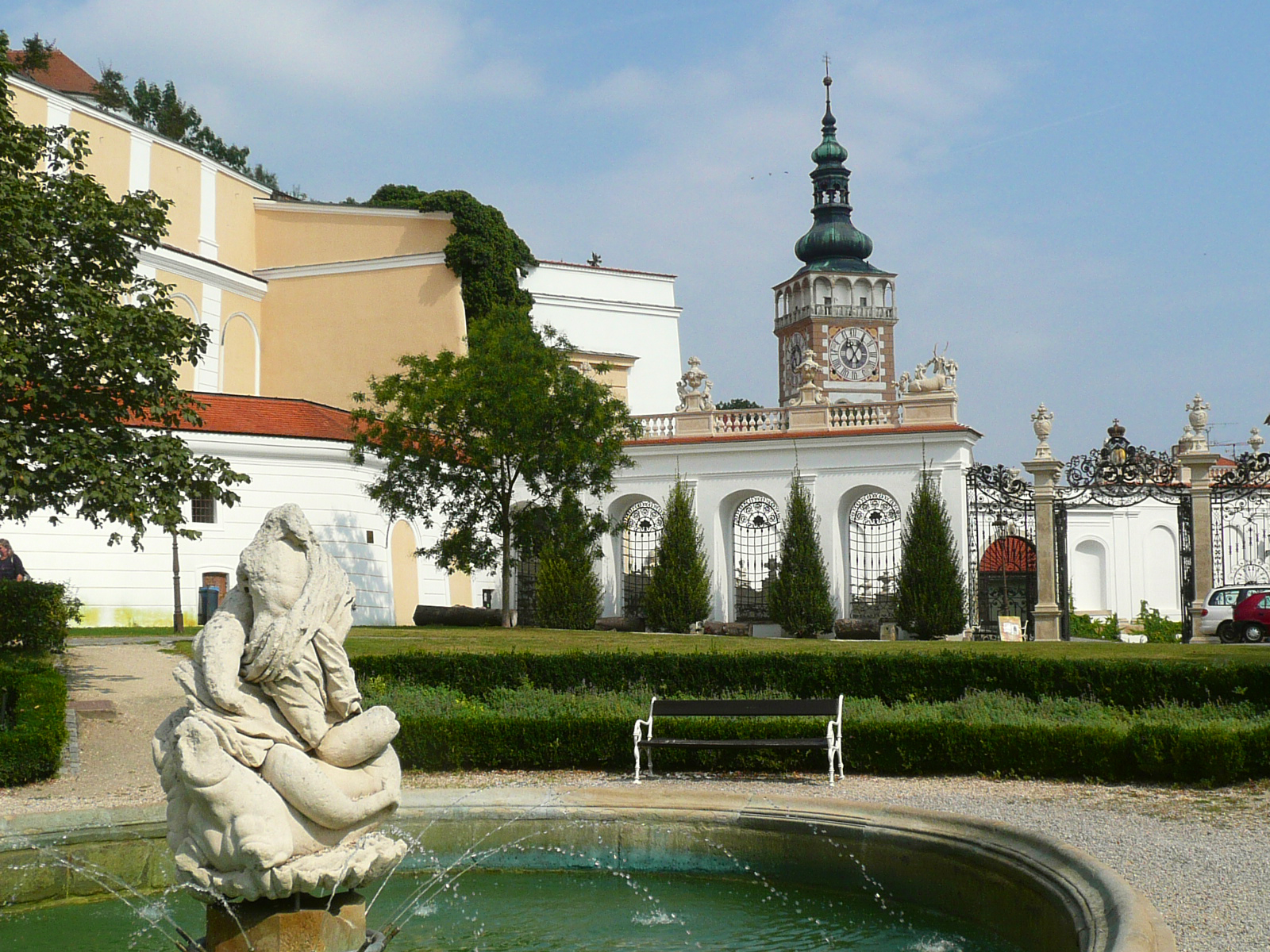
Castle park

A deed that mentioned existence of Mikulov in 1173 is a hoax from the 14th century. The first trustworthy written mention of Mikulov is from 1249. It is a deed, issued by the Přemyslid margrave Ottokar II, who granted a castle and the surrounding area to the Austrian noble Henry I of Liechtenstein. In 1279, Mikulov was given market rights.

In 1526, the Anabaptist leader Balthasar Hubmaier came from Switzerland to Mikulov, where he was captured and arrested by the forces of King Ferdinand I the following year. The Liechtenstein family owned the estate until 1560. In 1572, Emperor Maximilian II granted the fief to his ambassador to the Spanish court, Adam of Dietrichstein. From 1575 until the 20th century, Mikulov remained the proprietary possession of the Dietrichstein family and its Mensdorff-Pouilly successors.

After 1575, the Renaissance reconstruction of the town began. During the rule of Cardinal Franz von Dietrichstein, the town was transformed into a representative economic, architectural, and cultural residence, and for a time it became one of the most important towns in Moravia. In 1621, during the Thirty Years' War, Franz von Dietrichstein signed the Treaty of Nikolsburg with the Transylvanian prince Gabriel Bethlen at Mikulov Castle. Mikulov Castle became the place for many political meetings of important personalities, e.g. Albrecht von Wallenstein, Emperor Ferdinand II and Napoleon.

A significant moment in the history of the town was the invitation of the Piarists by Franz von Dietrichstein. They established a college here and renovated the medieval church and hospital. After a fire damaged the original Mikulov Castle in 1719, the Dietrichstein family reconstructed the castle to its present appearance. After the Austro-Prussian War, Count Alajos Károlyi began work on a peace treaty in the town that led to the Treaty of Prague in 1866.

The German population presented a majority until 1945. In 1890, it formed 98% of the population and in 1930 formed 82% of the population. Following World War II, the town's German population was expelled by the Czechoslovak government, according to the Beneš decrees.

=== Jewish population ===
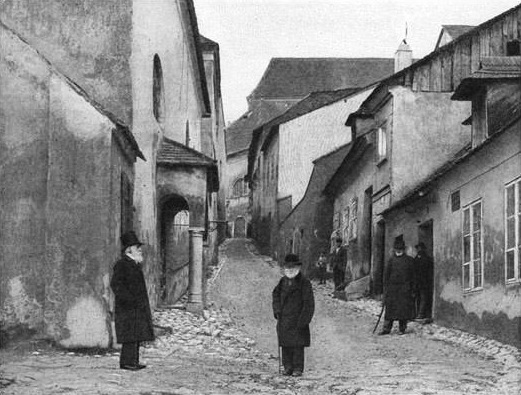
Jewish quarter in the 1900s

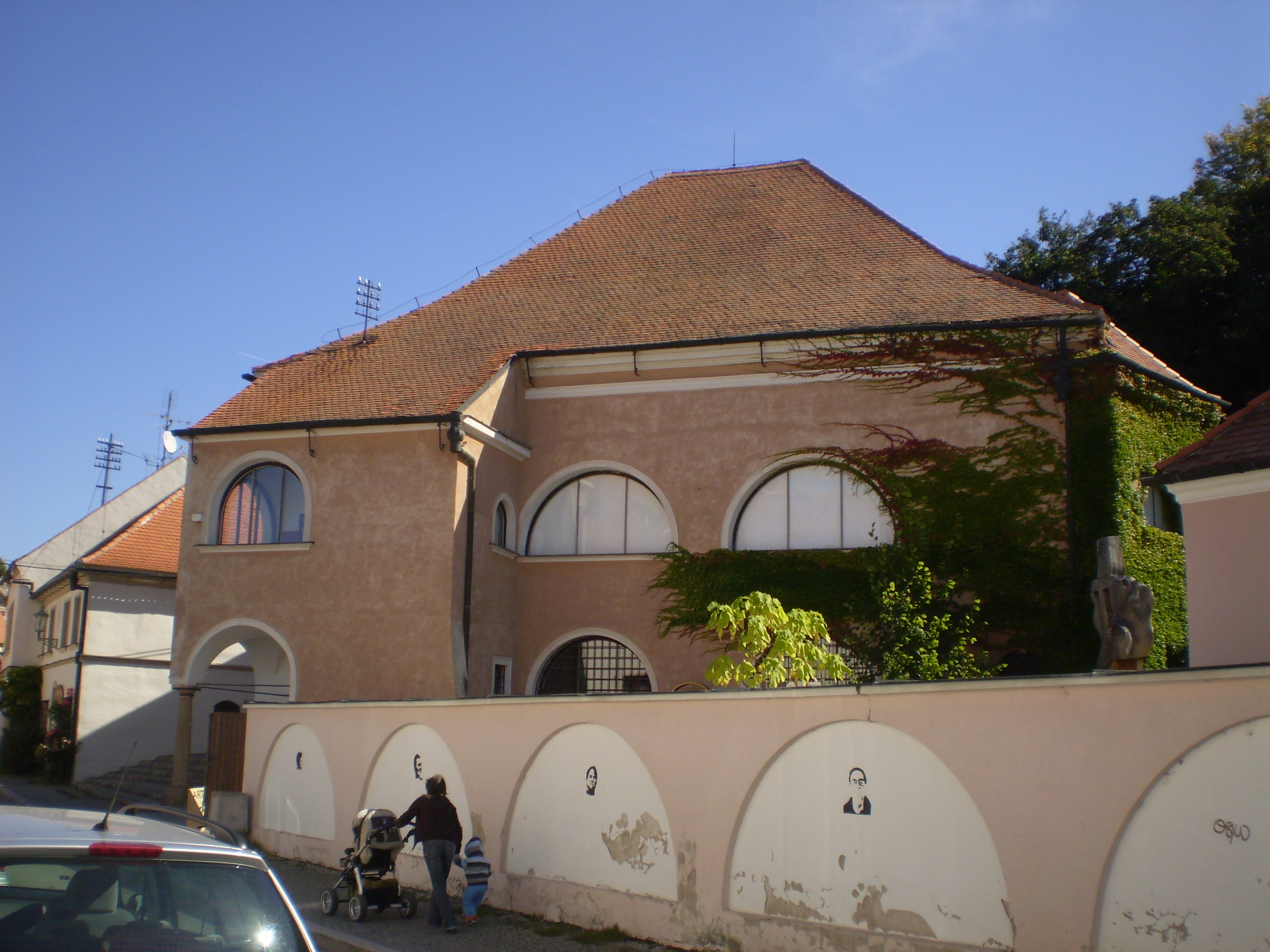
Synagogue in the former Jewish quarter

The beginning of the Jewish settlement in Nikolsburg dates as far back as 1421, when Jews were expelled from Vienna and the neighbouring province of Lower Austria by the duke of Austria, Albert II of Germany. The refugees settled in the town situated close to the Austrian border, some 85 kilometres (53 miles) from the Austrian capital, under the protection of the princes of Liechtenstein. Additional settlers were brought after the expulsion of the Jews from the Moravian royal boroughs by King Ladislaus the Posthumous after 1454.

The settlement grew in importance, and in the first half of the 16th century, Nikolsburg became the seat of the regional rabbi of Moravia, thus becoming a cultural centre of Moravian Jewry. The famous rabbi Judah Loew ben Bezalel, who is said to have created the golem of Prague, officiated here for twenty years as the second regional rabbi between 1553 and 1573. Cardinal Franz von Dietrichstein, son of Adam von Dietrichstein, was a special protector of the Jews, whose taxes were considered necessary to finance the Thirty Years' War.

In the first half of the 18th century, the congregation in Nikolsburg totalled over 600 families, comprising the largest Jewish settlement in Moravia. The census decreed by Empress Maria Theresa in 1754 ascertained that there were some 620 families established in Nikolsburg (i.e. the Jewish population of about 3,000 comprised half of the town's inhabitants). Only a small number of Jews could make their living in the town as artisans; the rest had to become merchants. The congregation suffered severely during the Silesian Wars between 1740 and 1763, when they had to furnish the monarchy with their share in the supertaxes exacted by the government of Maria Theresa from the Jews of Moravia.

Quite a number of Nikolsburg Jews continued to earn their livelihood in Vienna, where they were permitted to stay for some time on special passports. The freedom of residence, which was conceded to the Jews in Austria in 1848, reduced the number of resident Jews in Nikolsburg to less than one-third of the population it contained at the time of its highest development. In 1904, there were 749 Jewish residents in the town, out of a total population of 8,192. In 1938, prior to the German occupation of Czechoslovakia, the town population totaled about 8,000 mostly German-speaking inhabitants. Out of these, 472 were Jewish. The Jewish settlement in Nikolsburg ceased to exist during World War II, as only 110 managed to emigrate in time, and 327 of Mikulov's Jews did not survive the Holocaust. On 15 April 1945, 21 Hungarian Jewish prisoners working in a clay pit were massacred.

== Demographics ==
Historical population

| Year | Pop. | ±% |
|---|---|---|
| 1869 | 7,173 | — |
| 1880 | 7,642 | +6.5% |
| 1890 | 8,210 | +7.4% |
| 1900 | 8,092 | −1.4% |
| 1910 | 8,043 | −0.6% |

| Year | Pop. | ±% |
|---|---|---|
| 1921 | 7,699 | −4.3% |
| 1930 | 7,790 | +1.2% |
| 1950 | 5,337 | −31.5% |
| 1961 | 6,041 | +13.2% |
| 1970 | 6,254 | +3.5% |

| Year | Pop. | ±% |
|---|---|---|
| 1980 | 7,614 | +21.7% |
| 1991 | 7,477 | −1.8% |
| 2001 | 7,683 | +2.8% |
| 2011 | 7,287 | −5.2% |
| 2021 | 7,461 | +2.4% |

Source: Censuses

== Economy ==
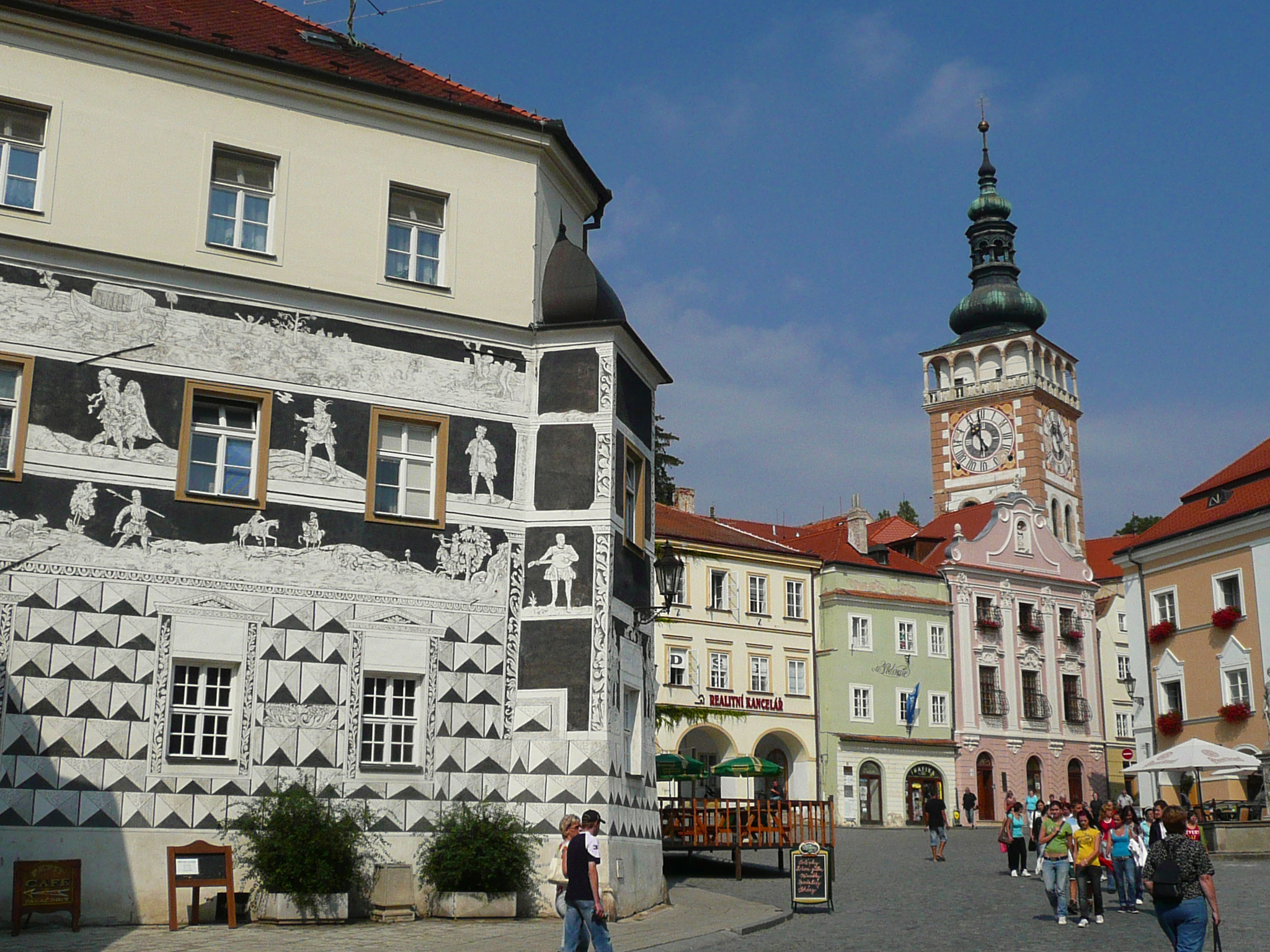
Main square

Mikulov is a centre of Czech wine-making due to its favorable geographic location and climate, as well as its unique history. Mikulov is the centre and the namesake of the Moravian wine sub-region called the Mikulovská wine region. Twelve registered cadastral vineyard tracts are situated within the Mikulov wine village as defined under the Czech Viticulture Act.

The largest employer with headquarters in Mikulov is Gebauer a Griller Kabeltechnik, a manufacturer of electric wires and cables. The company employs more than 500 people. The second notable industrial company is Copeland Czech, a manufacturer of piston compressors and condensing units with more than 200 employees.

== Transport ==
In the south, there is the road border crossing Mikulov / Drasenhofen. The I/52 road is part of the European route E461 and is to be extended as the D52 motorway. The second main road in Mikulov is I/40, which splits from I/52 and connects Mikulov with Břeclav.

Mikulov is located on the railway line Znojmo–Břeclav.

== Sights ==
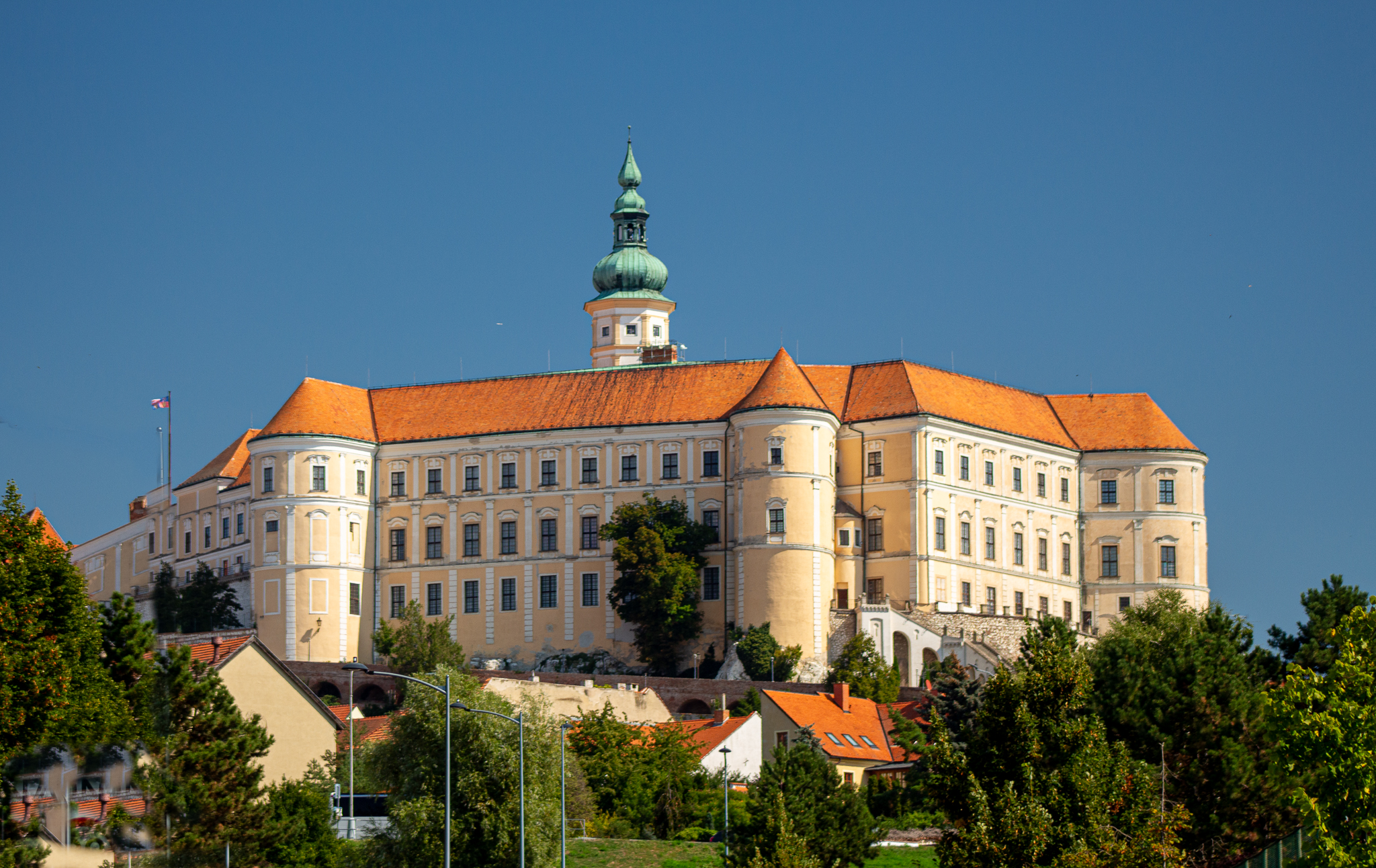
Mikulov Castle

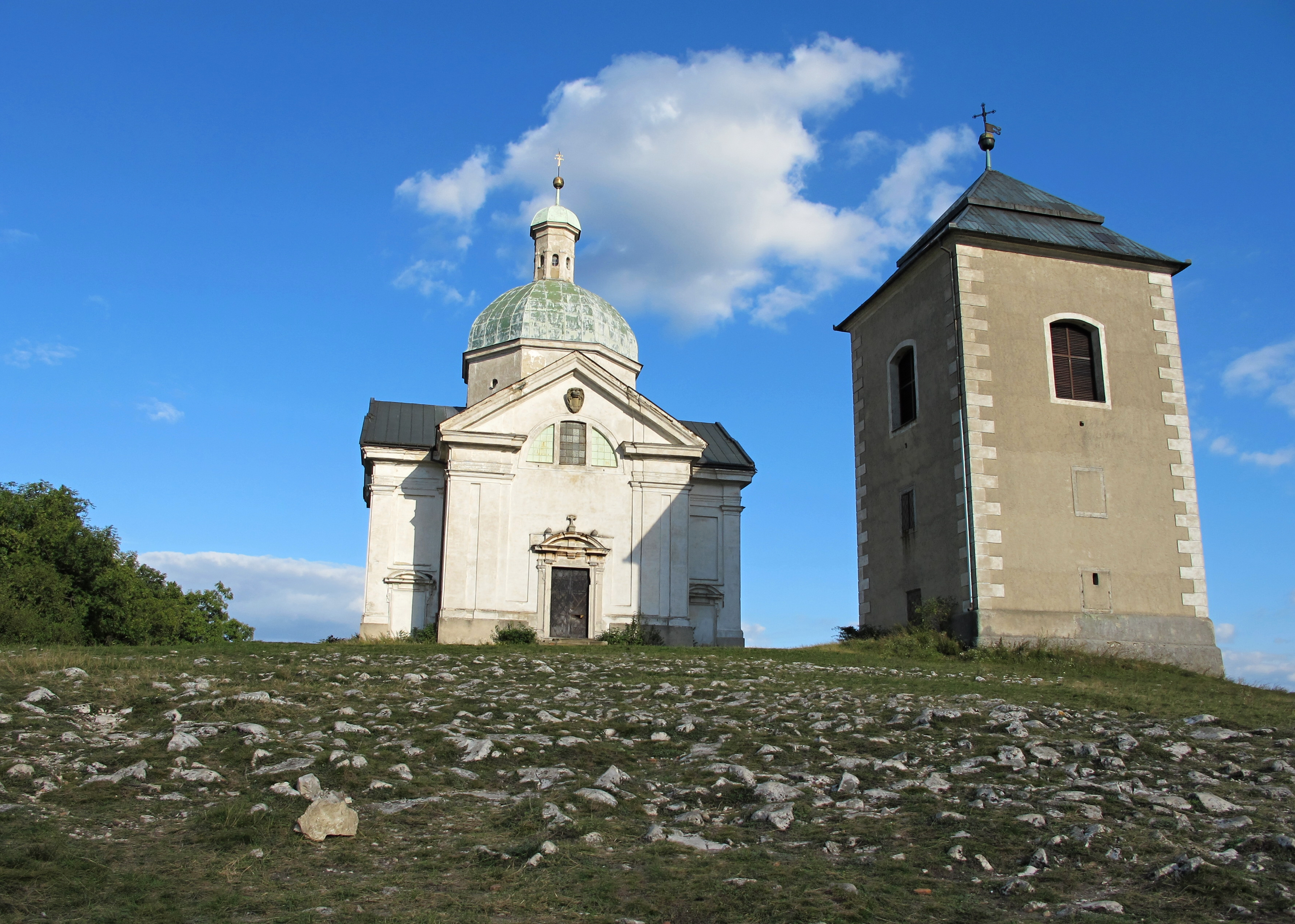
Chapel of St. Sebastian on Svatý kopeček

The main sight is Mikulov Castle, which was originally built in the Romanesque style. At the turn of the 16th and 17th centuries, it was rebuilt in the Renaissance style, and again in the late 17th century in the Baroque style. The last major reconstruction was made after a fire in 1719. Today it is the seat of the Regional Museum in Mikulov.

The historic town square was founded in the late 16th century near the castle. It contains Renaissance houses from the first half of the 17th century. One of the most significant houses is the U Rytířů House decorated with sgraffito. In the middle of the square is a fountain from around 1700 and monumental Baroque Holy Trinity Column from 1723–1724.

In Mikulov there are several historic churches. The originally Romanesque Church of St. Wenceslaus was built in the early 15th century and includes an ossuary. The Baroque Church of St. John the Baptist was consecrated in 1679 and belonged to the Piarist College. The interior was decorated by painter Franz Anton Maulbertsch. The neo-Gothic Orthodox Church of St. Nicolas was built in 1903. On the hill Svatý kopeček (literally 'holy hill') is the Chapel of St. Sebastian, built in the Baroque style in 1679. The path to the chapel is lined by Stations of the Cross, built in 1623–1639 and further expanded and decorated in the 17th and 18th centuries. The entire pilgrimage area is protected as a national cultural monument.

The history of the Jewish community can be observed by a trail through the old Jewish quarter. The synagogue, originally built in the 16th century and rebuilt as Baroque after a 1719 fire, is the only preserved synagogue in Moravia of the so-called Polish type. It houses an exposition on Rabbi Loew and Jewish education in Moravia. The large Jewish cemetery, one of the most significant in the country, was founded in the mid-15th century. It contains around 4,000 tombs, with the oldest preserved readable tomb dating from 1605.

Another important sight is the Dietrichstein tomb. It was originally the Church of Saint Anne, built as a copy of the Holy House of Loreto in 1623–1656. In the mid-19th century, it was converted into the family tomb of the Dietrichstein family.

Beginning in Mikulov, the Mikulov Wine Trail, measuring 62 km (39 mi), winds throughout the Mikulovská wine region and is a feature of wine tourism in the area.

== Notable people ==
=== Born in Mikulov ===
- Johann Ferdinand Hertodt (1645–1722), German medical doctor and writer
- Moses ben Avraham Avinu (?–1733/34), Moravian-Austrian printer and author
- Jakab Fellner (1722–1780), German-Moravian Baroque architect
- Joseph Antony Adolph (1729 – c. 1771), painter
- Joseph von Sonnenfels (1732–1817), Austrian-German jurist and novelist
- Anton Joseph Leeb (1769–1837), Mayor of Vienna (1835–1837)
- Romeo Seligmann (1808–1892), Austrian medical doctor and historian
- Heinrich Landesmann (1821–1902), Austrian poet and philosophical writer
- Heinrich Auspitz (1835–1886), Austrian dermatologist
- Leopold Oser (1839–1910), Austrian medical doctor
- Elkan Bauer (1852–1942), Austrian composer
- Max Pohl (1855–1935), Austrian actor
- Erich Fritz Schweinburg (1890–1959), Austrian writer and attorney
- Adolf Schärf (1890–1965), Austrian politician and President of Austria (1957–1965)
- Manfred Ackermann (1898–1991), Austrian politician
- Karel Krautgartner (1922–1982), musician

=== Resided in Mikulov ===
- Balthasar Hubmaier (c. 1480–1528), German Anabaptist leader
- Leonhard Schiemer (c. 1500–1528), Austrian Anabaptist writer
- Maximilian, Prince of Dietrichstein (1596–1655), owner of the Mikulov estate
- Aaron Samuel Kaidanover (1614–1676), Polish-Lithuanian rabbi
- Joseph Almosnino (1642–1689), Greek-Serbian rabbi
- Judah he-Hasid (1660–1700), Jewish preacher
- Yaakov Yitzchak of Lublin (1745–1815), Polish rabbi
- Abraham Trebitsch (1760–1840), Austrian Jewish scholar
- Simcha Bunim of Peshischa (1765–1827), Polish rabbi
- Abraham Neuda (1812–1854), Moravian rabbi
- Joel Deutsch (1813–1899), Jewish writer and deaf educator
- Simon Bacher (1823–1891), Hungarian Neo-Hebraic poet
- Meyer Kayserling (1829–1905), German rabbi
- Samuel Baeck (1834–1912), German rabbi
- Alphonse Mucha (1860-1939), Czech painter
- Karl Renner (1870–1950), Austrian politician, President of Austria (1945–1950)

=== Rabbis ===
- Judah Loew ben Bezalel (c. 1553–1573)
- Yom-Ṭob Lipmann Heller (1624–?)
- Menahem Mendel Krochmal (1648–1661)
- Gershon Ashkenazi (1661–?)
- David Oppenheim (1690–1702)
- Shmuel Shmelke (1772–1778)
- Mordecai Benet (1789–1829)
- Nahum Trebitsch (1831–1842)
- Samson Raphael Hirsch (1847–1851)
- Solomon Quetsch (1855–1856)
- David Feuchtwang (1892–1903)

== Twin towns – sister cities ==
Mikulov is twinned with:

- Bardejov, Slovakia
- Drasenhofen, Austria
- Galanta, Slovakia
- Novalja, Croatia
- Šumperk, Czech Republic
- Tuchów, Poland

== Gallery ==
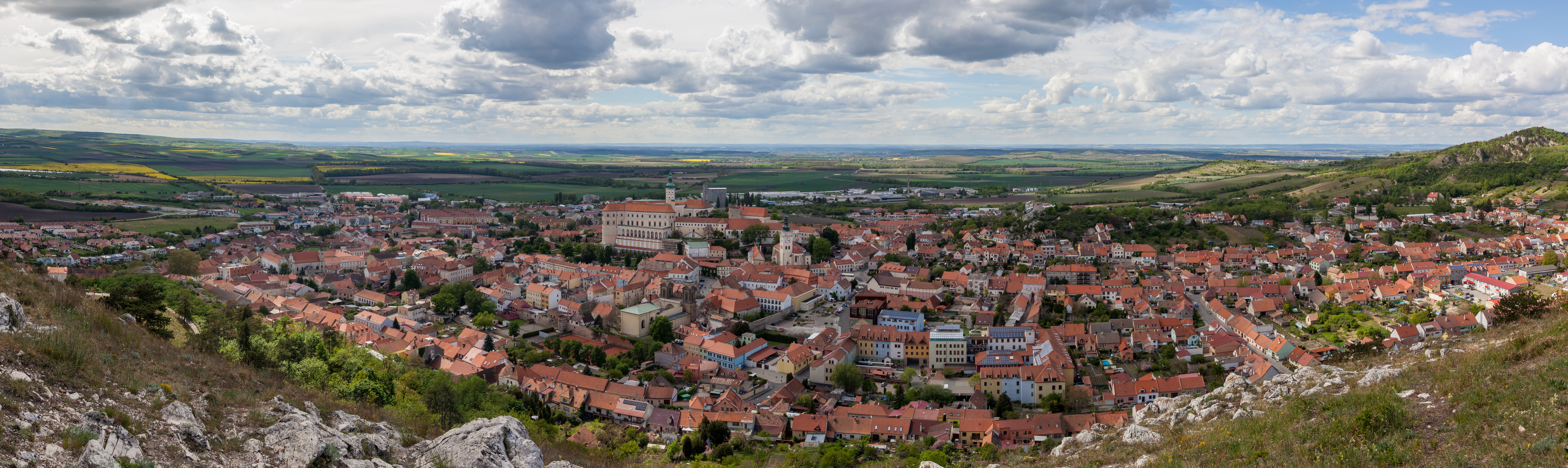
Panorama view from the hill Svatý kopeček
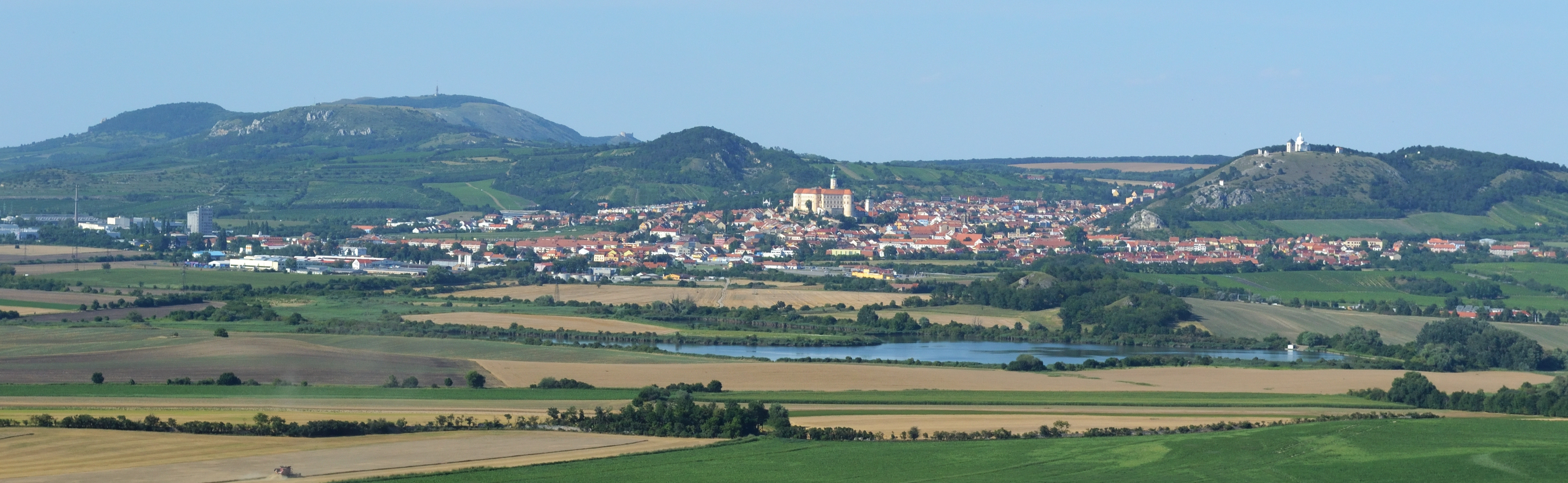
Panorama view from Austria (Kreuzberg)

== See also ==
- Old Hungarian alphabet of Nikolsburg
- Ostlandkreuz
