= Solomon Quetsch =

Austrian rabbi and Talmudist

Solomon Quetsch was an Austrian rabbi and Talmudist. He was born at Nikolsburg, Moravia on 13 October 1798 and died there on 30 January 1856. He was educated at the yeshiva of his native city under Mordechai Benet, and was his premier disciple. He officiated as rabbi successively at Piesling, Leipnik, and Nikolsburg. In the later city, where he succeeded Rabbi Samson Raphael Hirsch, he officiated for only a few months. He was a traditionalist, but was distinguished by a tolerant and kindly disposition. Of his literary works only some Talmudic novellæ are known, edited under the title Chokmat Shelomoh in the collection Har haMor by Moses Löb Kohn (Vienna, 1862).
