= D52 motorway =

Czech motorway

D52 Motorway
- Dálnice D52

Route information
- Part of E461
- Length: 16.8 km (10.4 mi) Planned: 45.3 km (28.1 mi)

Major junctions
- From: D 1 in Brno
- To: Austrian border near Mikulov

Location
- Country: Czech Republic
- Regions: South Moravian
- Major cities: Brno, Mikulov

Highway system
- Highways in the Czech Republic
← D 49	→ D 55

D52 motorway (Czech: Dálnice D52) is a motorway in the South Moravian Region of the Czech Republic, currently leading from Modřice, about 7 km (4.3 mi) south of Brno, to Pohořelice, parallel to the D2 motorway. It forms part of the European road E461.

== Sections ==
Within the agglomeration of Brno plans for a new route intend to relocate the D52 running from the Rajhrad junction bypassing the city centre to reach the Highway D1 and the Expressway R43 at Troubsko.

Parts of the motorway were built on sections of the former Strecke 88 Autobahn constructed between 1939 and 1942 during the German occupation of Czechoslovakia as part of a connection between Breslau (Wrocław) and Vienna, colloquially called Hitlerova dálnice ("Hitler's motorway").

Prior to year 2016, this highway was categorised as Expressway R52 (Czech: rychlostní silnice R52).

A 22.5-kilometre-long (14.0 mi) section between Pohořelice and Mikulov is planned for 2028, providing a continuous connection between Brno and the Austrian A5 (North Autobahn) at Drasenhofen, leading to Vienna.

=== Dispute ===
There is a long-standing dispute over the continuation of the motorway. While the Directorate of Roads and Motorways has persistently advocated using the I/52 road directly for the construction of the motorway to the maximum extent, which in the section from Pohořelice to Mikulov runs outside the villages and in a footprint more or less compliant with the motorway parameters, opponents have proposed using the D2 motorway from Brno to Breclav for the Brno-Vienna transit and from there to build a link to the state border.

This route via Breclav was advocated by some municipalities below Pálava and environmentalist groups, as they feared environmental damage in the area of the Novomlýnské nádraží reservoirs and the Pálava protected landscape area, along whose western border the I/52 road runs. These disputes have also delayed the decision to build the Břeclav bypass on the I/55 road.

On 23 January 2009, an agreement was signed in Vienna between the Czech Republic and Austria on the connection of the R52 expressway with the Austrian A5 motorway on the Brno-Vienna route in the Mikulov-Drasenhofen section (in the area of the former border crossing). The construction of the R52 was supposed to start in 2010, but on the petition of the municipalities of Bavory and Dolní Dunajovice and several individuals, the Supreme Administrative Court annulled the zoning plan of the Břeclav region in November 2009, including the disputed R52 route between Pohořelice and Vienna. The European Commission also criticised the procedure of the Czech authorities in approving the zoning plan of the Břeclav region and refused to co-finance the construction until the situation was clarified.

== Route description ==
Country	Region	Location	km	mi	Exit	Name	Destinations	Notes
Czech Republic	South Moravian Region	South Moravian Region	0	0.0	—	Brno-centrum	D 0	Kilometrage starting point Not an expressway or motorway (tram track in the middle). Proposed as a future extension of D52
Czech Republic	South Moravian Region	South Moravian Region	7	4.3	—	Modřice		Not an expressway or motorway (tram track in the middle). Proposed as a future extension of D52
Czech Republic	South Moravian Region	South Moravian Region	9	5.6	—	Popovice		Temporary start to the D52
Czech Republic	South Moravian Region	South Moravian Region	10	6.2	—	Rajhrad		
Czech Republic	South Moravian Region	South Moravian Region			Rest area	Odpočívka Rajhrad		
Czech Republic	South Moravian Region	South Moravian Region	16	9.9	—	Hrušovany		
Czech Republic	South Moravian Region	South Moravian Region	23	14	—	Pohořelice-sever		
Czech Republic	South Moravian Region	South Moravian Region	26	16	—	Pohořelice-jih	I/52 E461	Temporary exit (other sections in preparation)
1.000 mi = 1.609 km; 1.000 km = 0.621 mi: Proposed; Route transition; Unopened

== Gallery ==
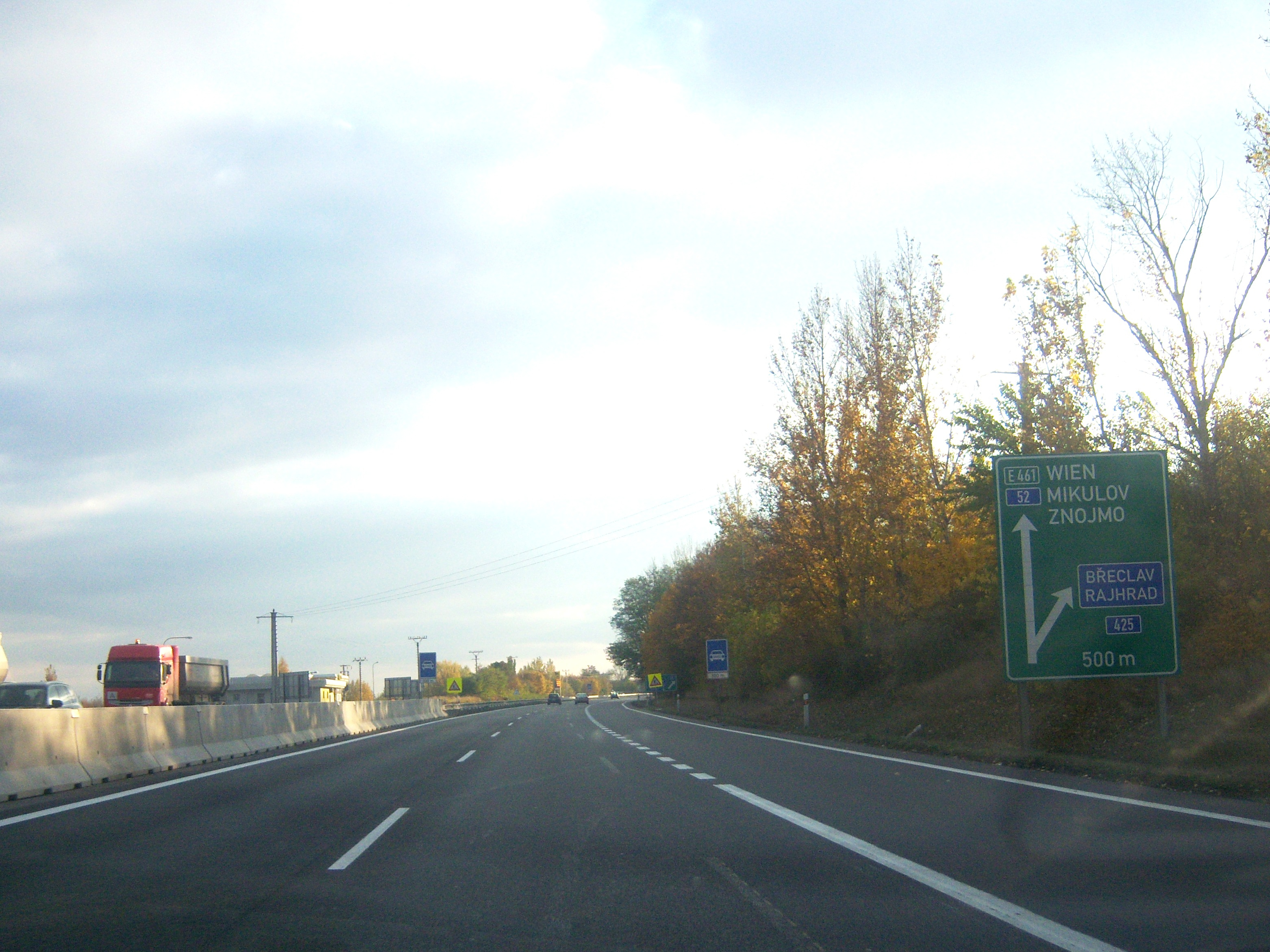

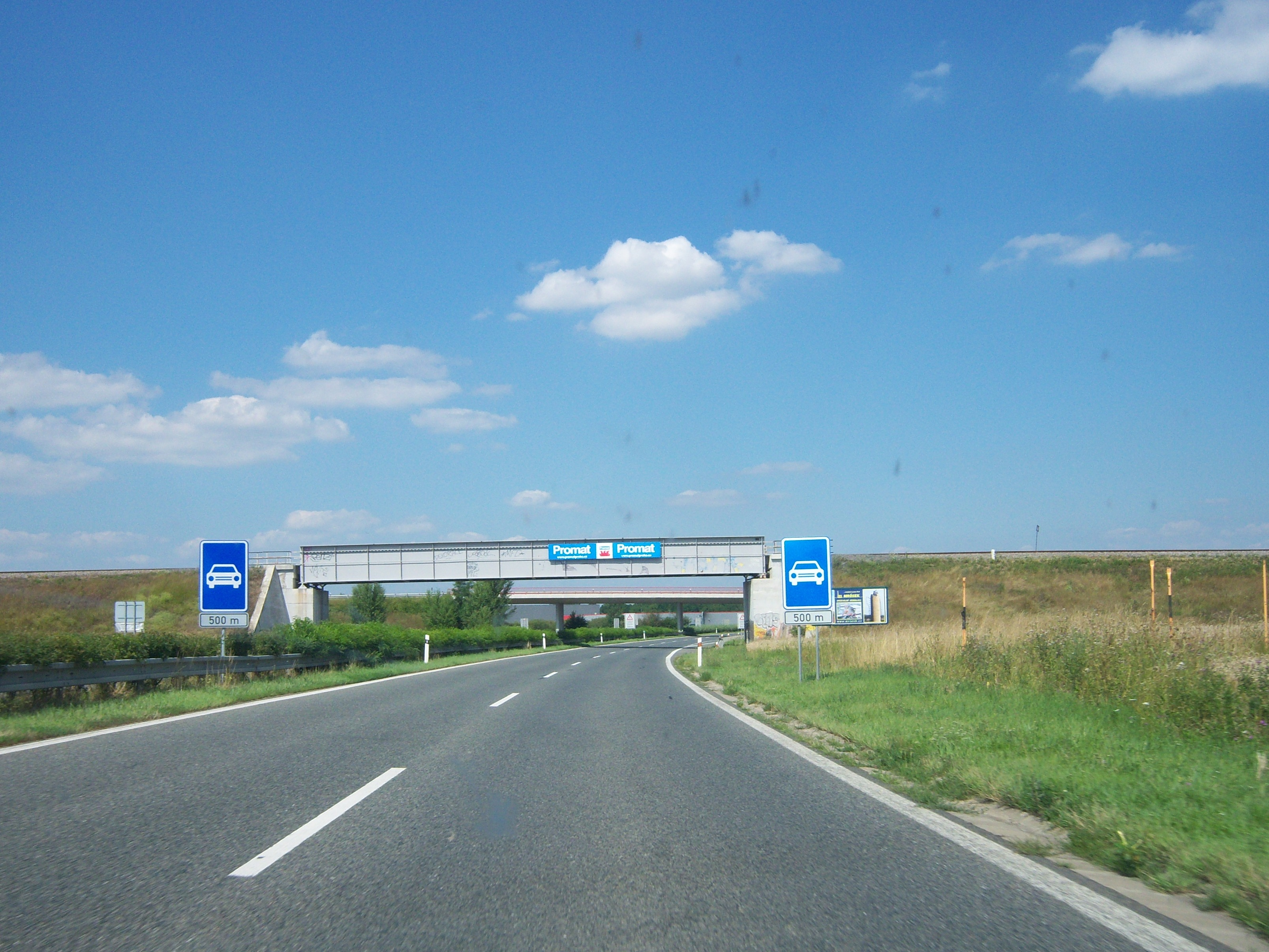
