= Joel Deutsch =

Dr. Joel Deutsch
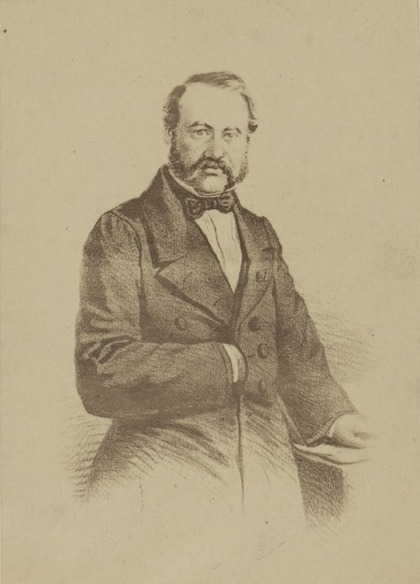
- Born: 20 March 1813; Nikolsburg, Austrian Empire
- Died: 1 May 1899 (aged 86); Vienna, Austria-Hungary
- Burial place: Old Jewish Cemetery, Vienna Central Cemetery (Gate I, 7-29-1)
- Occupation: Educator

Joel Deutsch (Hebrew: יוֹאֵל דוֹיטְשׁ; 20 March 1813, Nikolsburg – 1 May 1899, Vienna) was a Moravian Jewish writer, pedagogue, and distinguished deaf educator.

== Biography ==
Joel Deutsch was born in Nikolsburg, Moravia. He was a close student of rabbinical literature and an energetic collector of Hebrew books. In 1844, he became a teacher at the Allgemeine österreichische israelitische Taubstummen-Institut in Nikolsburg, a school for deaf Jewish children established that year by philanthropist Hirsch Kolisch at the suggestion of Catholic priest Dr. Franz Herrmann Czech.

The school developed into one of the leading schools of its kind in Europe, and was one of the first schools for deaf children which started an intensive auditory education program, thanks to its close co-operation with otologist Viktor Urbantschitsch. In a letter to Edward Walter, director of the Institute for the Deaf in Berlin, Deutsch asserted that the students who had undergone their training programme were of decided intelligence, contrary to contemporary thought about deaf-mutes. In support of this contention, he sent an essay by one of his students, Bernhard Brill, and said that he doubted whether any non-disabled person "could match his lucid and incisive style."

Deutsch became director when the school was transferred to Vienna in 1852. In 1859 he was decorated with the Goldene Verdienstkranz and in 1869 received the title Kaiserlicher Rath. On 17 February 1870, Deutsch survived an attempted murder by a teacher named Isaac Bardach, who had been severely reprimanded by Deutsch for whipping several of the children unmercilessly.

Deutsch retired from his position in 1888. His pupils became teachers in the schools for the deaf of New York City, London, Budapest, and Lemberg, and the leading Jewish schools for deaf children were influenced by his work.

== Bibliography ==
- Biblische Geschichte für israelitische Taubstumme, Vienna, 1863
- Wörtersammlung zur Gedächtnissübung für den Ersten Anschauungsunterricht Taubstummer Kinder, Vienna, 1881
- Wörter- und Aufgabensammlung für den Ersten Unterricht Taubstummer Kinder, Vienna, 1881
- Vorlege-Blätter zur Einleitung der Unentbehrlichsten Grammatischen Formen, Teplitz, 1877
