= Joseph Antony Adolph =

Joseph Antony Adolph (often Adolphe) (1729–after 1771) was a Moravian painter who spent part of his career in England.

== Life ==
He was born at Nikolsburg in Moravia (now Mikulov in the Czech Republic), on 6 July 1721, the son of Joseph Frank Adolph, painter to Prince C. Max von Dietrichstein. He was in Paris in 1745 and by 1750 he was in England, where he stayed for some years. He painted an equestrian portrait of the Prince of Wales (later King George III of Great Britain); an engraving after it, by Bernard Baron, was published in 1755. He spent some time in Norfolk, painting portraits of Elisha de Hague and Benjamin Hancock for the collection of civic portraits hung in St Andrew's Hall in Norwich in 1764, and exhibiting his paintings "at the Bowling Green, near Chapel Fields" in the city that year. A portrait of Caroline D'Arcy, 4th Marchioness of Lothian in the collection of the National Galleries of Scotland, previously attributed to Allan Ramsay is now thought to be by Adolph; the collection suggests that it may have been painted when she was living at Blickling, Norfolk, in around 1750.

During his years in England Adolph is said to have worked mostly as a portrait painter, but on his return to Austria he was employed in the decoration of interiors, adorning walls with frescoes, and painting the ceilings of large saloons. Three altarpieces by him are in the collegiate church of Nikolsburg. The date of his death is unknown, although he was still alive in 1772.

== Sources ==
- This article incorporates text from a publication now in the public domain: Stephen, Leslie, ed. (1885). "Adolph, Joseph Antony". Dictionary of National Biography. Vol. 1. London: Smith, Elder & Co.
