= Bernard Baron =

French engraver and etcher

Bernard Baron (1696? – 1762) was a French engraver and etcher who spent much of his life in England.

== Life ==
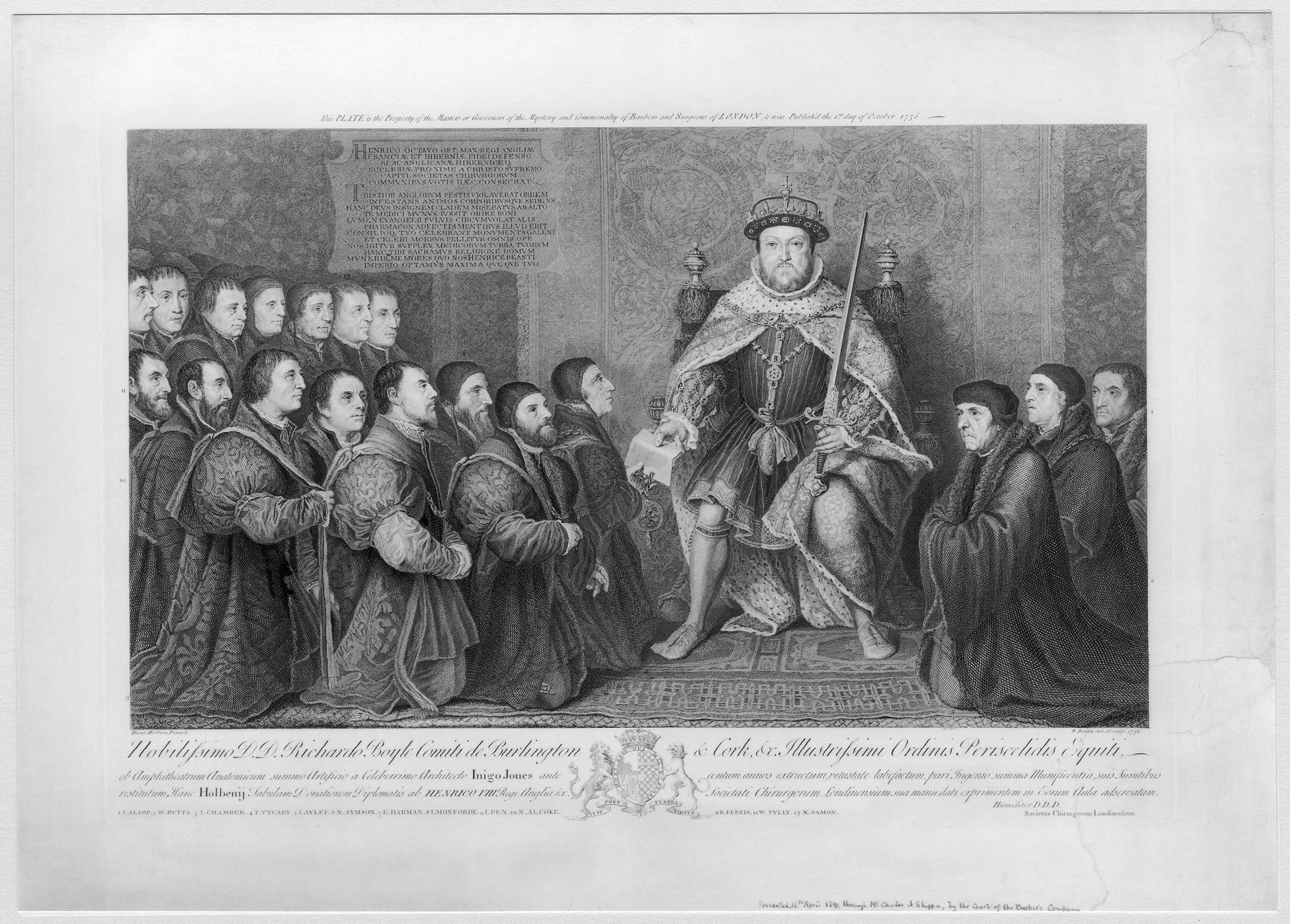
Henry VIII granting the Charter to the Barber-Surgeons' Company, after the painting by Hans Holbein the Younger.

Baron was born in Paris in 1696, the son of the engraver Laurent Baron and his wife Aveline, and studied under his stepfather, Nicolas-Henri Tardieu. In 1712 he moved to London at the invitation of Claude Dubosc, in order to assist him on his engravings of Laguerre's mural at Marlborough House. He was one of the French engravers who produced a set of plates after Thornhill's paintings in the dome of St. Paul's Cathedral, and in 1720 he assisted Dubosc and Nicolas Dorigny with their engravings after the Raphael cartoons. In 1724 Baron engraved eight plates of the Life of Achilles after Rubens.

In 1729, he temporarily returned to Paris where he engraved four plates for the Recueil Jullienne, a compendium of 271 engravings of Watteau's paintings and decorations commissioned by the textile manufacturer, engraver, and art collector Jean de Jullienne, eventually published in 1735. Some art historians have suggested that a drawing by Watteau of an engraver at work, in the collection of British Museum, is a portrait of Baron. He also engraved a plate after Titian for the Recueil Crozat, a collection of prints of Italian paintings in French collections published in 1742.

In 1735 Baron was one of a group of leading London artists shown in Gawen Hamilton's painting A Conversation of Virtuosis He was one of four French engravers employed by William Hogarth to produce plates for his series Marriage à la mode. He also engraved portraits by Hogarth and Allan Ramsay, and works by Holbein, Rubens, Van Dyck, and Teniers. He gave evidence to the committee of the House of Commons which led to the Engravers Copyright Act.

He died in London on 24 January 1762. His plates were inherited by his son, also called Bernard, on whose death they were bought by the publisher John Boydell.

Writing in the late 18th century, Joseph Strutt described Baron's style as "slight and coarse, without any great effect", adding that "his drawing is frequently very defective."

== Works ==
His most notable works were:

=== Portraits ===
- King Charles I on Horseback, with the Duke d'Epernon, after Van Dyck.
- Charles I and Queen, with their two Sons, after Van Dyck.
- The Nassau Family, from a picture in Earl Cowper's collection, by Van Dyck.
- The Pembroke Family, from a picture at Wilton House, by Van Dyck.
- Henry VIII granting the Charter to the Barber-Surgeons' Company, after Holbein (pictured).
- Robert, Earl of Carnarvon, and Anna Sophia, Countess of Carnavon, both after Van Dyck.
- George, Prince of Wales, on Horseback, after Adolph.
- Cornells van Tromp, Vice-Admiral of Holland, after John Vanderbank.
- Dr. Mead, after Allan Ramsay.
- The Lord Chancellor Hardwick, after Allan Ramsay.
- The Lord Chief Justice Reve, after J. Amiconi.
- The Cornaro Family, after Titian, from a picture in the collection of the Duke of Northumberland.
- Benjamin Hoadly, Bishop of Winchester, after Hogarth.

=== After other paintings ===
- Nine plates of the Life of Achilles, with the titles; after Rubens.
- Belisarius, incorrectly called after Van Dyck.
- Charles I escaping from Hampton Court, after J. d' Angelis.
- Jupiter and Antiope, after Titian, for the Crozat Collection.
- Pan and Syrinx, after Nicolas Bertin.
- The Card-players and The Temptation of St. Anthony after Teniers.
- The Italian Comedians, The Companion, The Two Cousins, Soldiers plundering a Village and The Peasants revenged, after Watteau.
- St. Cecilia, after Carlo Dolci.
- Moses exposed on the Nile, after Le Sueur.
- Two plates after Hogarth's Marriage-à-la-mode.
- The Apotheosis or Death of the King (1728) after John Vanderbank:

== Sources ==
- Strutt, Joseph (1786). A Biographical Dictionary Containing All the Engravers, From the Earliest Period of the Art of Engraving to the Present Day. Vol. 1. London: Robert Faulder.

Attribution:
