= Hajany (Strakonice District) =

- Municipality
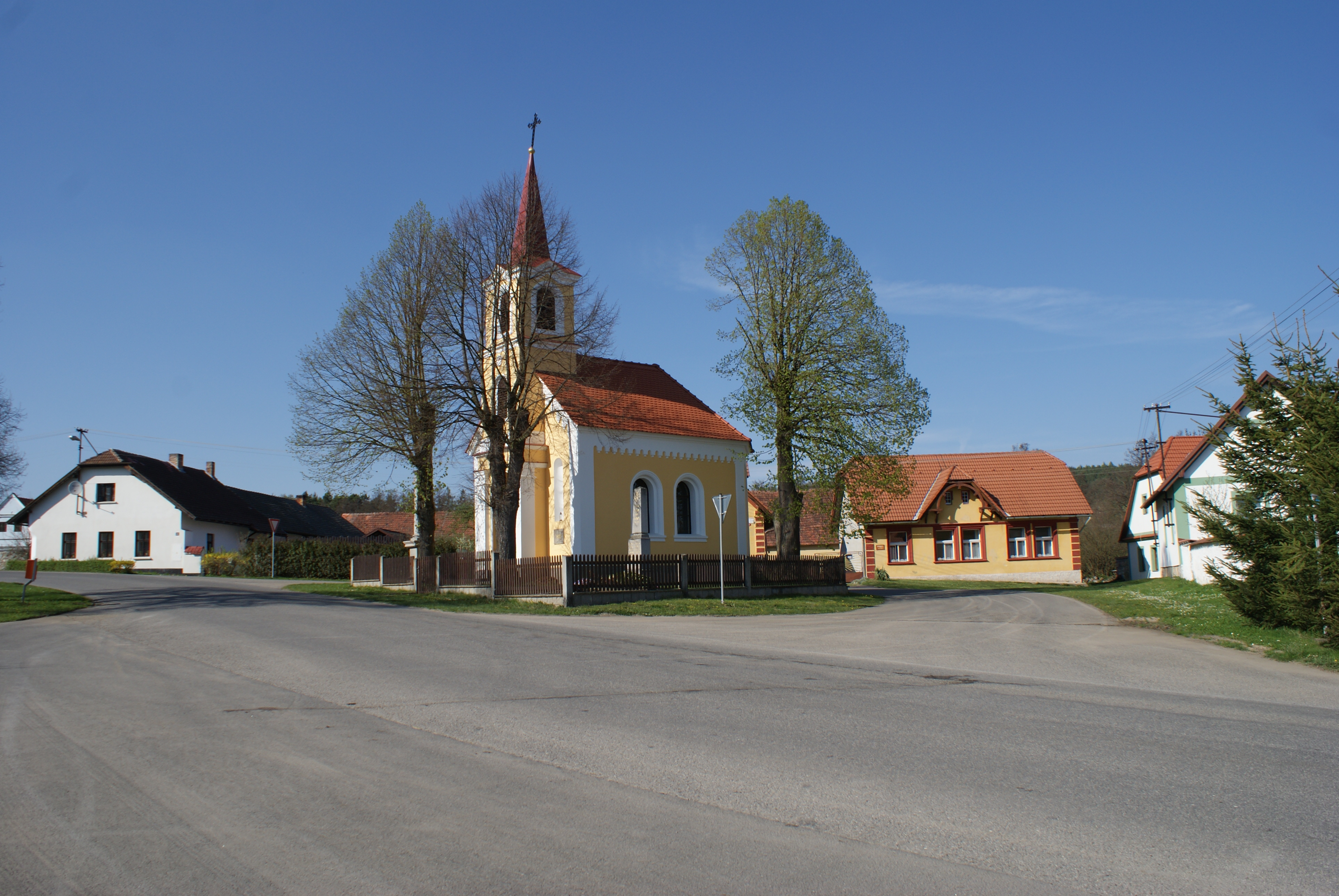
- Chapel of Saint Anne

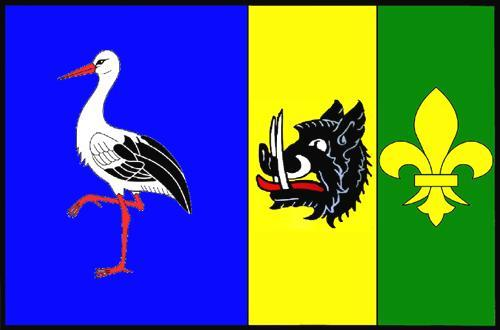
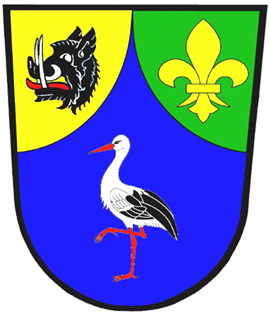
- Flag Coat of arms

- Location in the Czech Republic
- Coordinates: 49°26′48″N 13°50′10″E
- Country: Czech Republic
- Region: South Bohemian
- District: Strakonice
- First mentioned: 1318

Area
  - Total: 3.82 km^{2} (1.47 sq mi)
- Elevation: 455 m (1,493 ft)

Population (2026-01-01)
  - Total: 182
  - Density: 47.6/km^{2} (123/sq mi)
- Time zone: UTC+1 (CET)
  - Summer (DST): UTC+2 (CEST)
- Postal code: 388 01
- Website: www.obechajany.cz

Hajany is a municipality and village in Strakonice District in the South Bohemian Region of the Czech Republic. It has about 200 inhabitants.

Hajany lies approximately 21 kilometres (13 mi) north of Strakonice, 70 km (43 mi) north-west of České Budějovice, and 83 km (52 mi) south-west of Prague.

== Demographics ==
Historical population
Year	Pop.	±%
1869	355	—
1880	365	+2.8%
1890	316	−13.4%
1900	271	−14.2%
1910	279	+3.0%
1921	256	−8.2%
1930	226	−11.7%
1950	202	−10.6%
1961	159	−21.3%
1970	129	−18.9%
1980	121	−6.2%
1991	91	−24.8%
2001	84	−7.7%
2011	126	+50.0%
2021	160	+27.0%
Source: Censuses
