= Kokory =

- Municipality
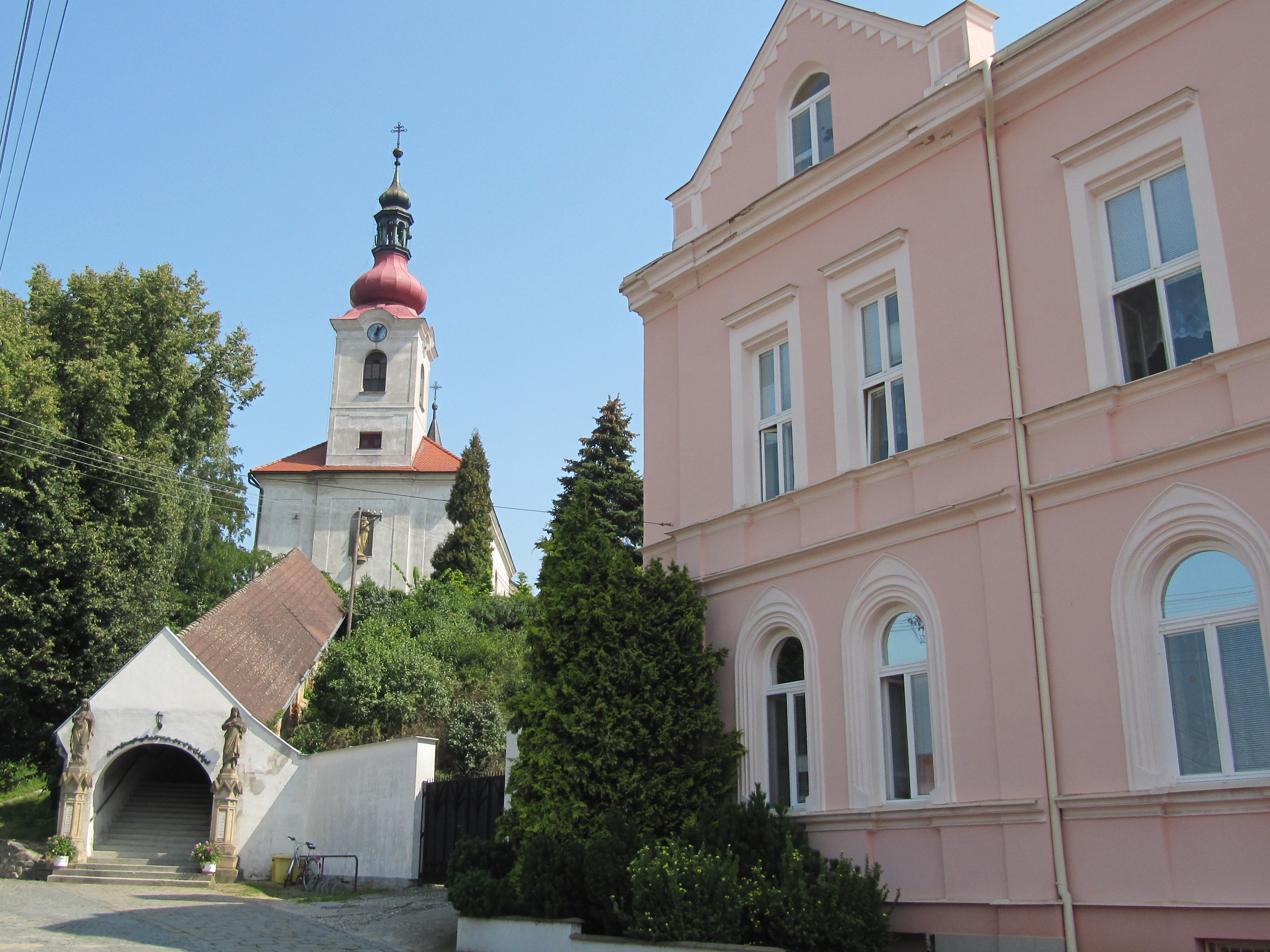
- Church of the Assumption of the Virgin Mary

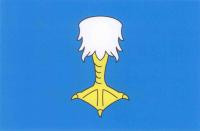
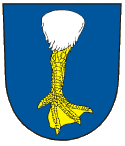
- Flag Coat of arms

- Location in the Czech Republic
- Coordinates: 49°29′41″N 17°22′32″E
- Country: Czech Republic
- Region: Olomouc
- District: Přerov
- First mentioned: 1279

Area
  - Total: 6.71 km^{2} (2.59 sq mi)
- Elevation: 250 m (820 ft)

Population (2026-01-01)
  - Total: 1,064
  - Density: 159/km^{2} (411/sq mi)
- Time zone: UTC+1 (CET)
  - Summer (DST): UTC+2 (CEST)
- Postal code: 751 05
- Website: www.obeckokory.cz

Kokory is a municipality and village in Přerov District in the Olomouc Region of the Czech Republic. It has about 1,100 inhabitants.

Kokory lies approximately 8 kilometres (5 mi) north-west of Přerov, 14 km (9 mi) south-east of Olomouc, and 223 km (139 mi) east of Prague.

== Demographics ==
Historical population
Year	Pop.	±%
1869	1,025	—
1880	1,022	−0.3%
1890	1,011	−1.1%
1900	1,112	+10.0%
1910	1,155	+3.9%
1921	1,248	+8.1%
1930	1,275	+2.2%
1950	1,256	−1.5%
1961	1,322	+5.3%
1970	1,245	−5.8%
1980	1,125	−9.6%
1991	1,110	−1.3%
2001	1,106	−0.4%
2011	1,133	+2.4%
2021	1,114	−1.7%
Source: Censuses
