= Drasenhofen =

- Municipality
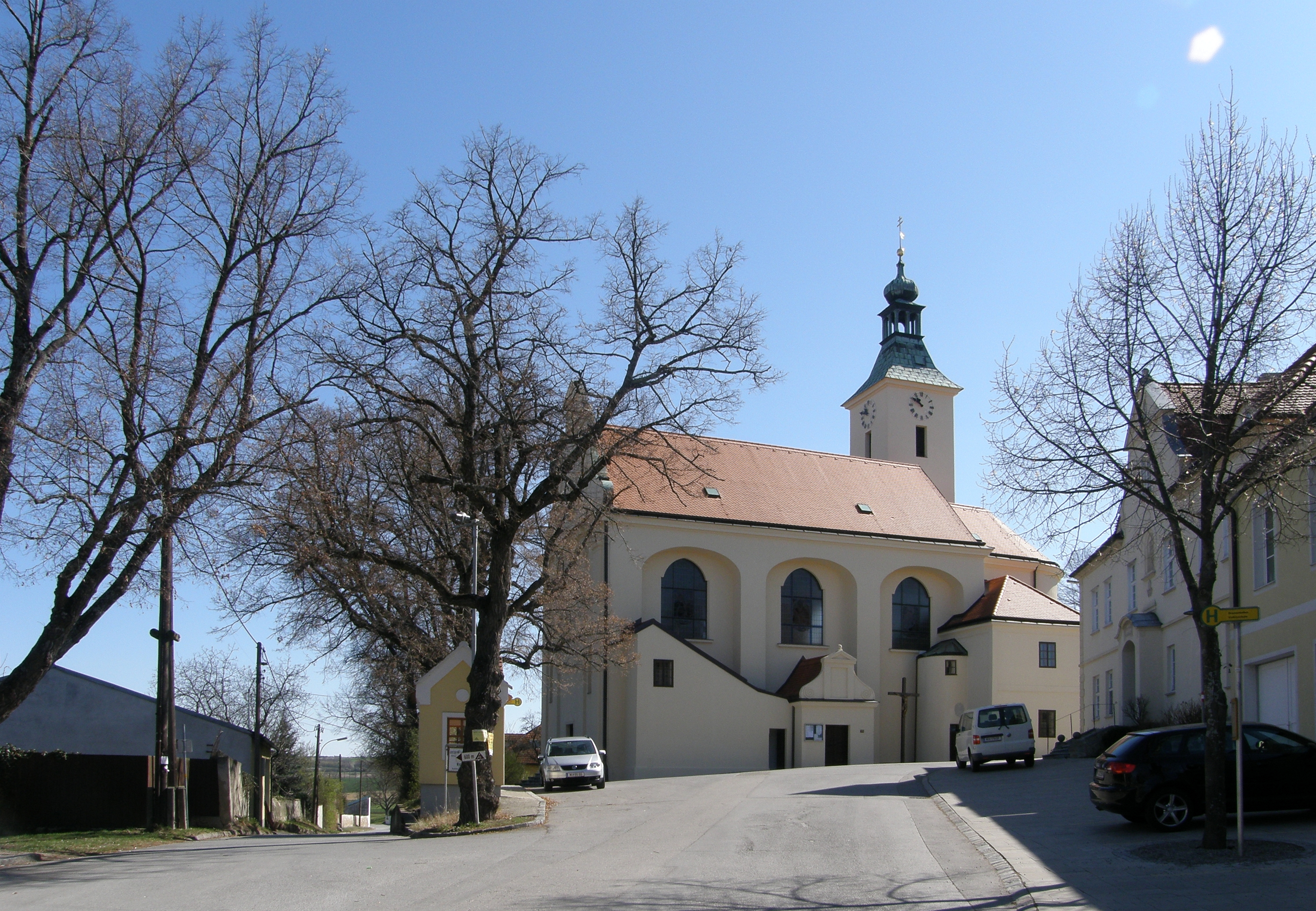
- Church of Saint Vitus

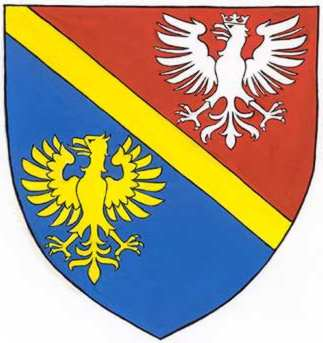
- Coat of arms

- Location within Austria
- Coordinates: 48°45′N 16°39′E
- Country: Austria
- State: Lower Austria
- District: Mistelbach

Government
  - Mayor: Horst Frank (ÖVP)

Area
  - Total: 35.2 km^{2} (13.6 sq mi)
- Elevation: 224 m (735 ft)

Population (2018-01-01)
  - Total: 1,109
  - Density: 31.5/km^{2} (81.6/sq mi)
- Time zone: UTC+1 (CET)
  - Summer (DST): UTC+2 (CEST)
- Postal code: 2165
- Area code: 02554
- Website: www.drasenhofen.at

Drasenhofen is a municipality in the district of Mistelbach in the Austrian state of Lower Austria. It is located directly on the border with Czech Republic. In the future the Austrian A5 Nordautobahn from Vienna will connect to the Czech D52 motorway.

== Subdivisions ==
The subdivisions of Drasenhofen are:

- Drasenhofen
- Steinebrunn
- Stützenhofen
- Kleinschweinbarth

== Population ==
Historical population
Year	Pop.	±%
1971	1,698	—
1981	1,511	−11.0%
1991	1,340	−11.3%
2001	1,143	−14.7%
