= Babice (Uherské Hradiště District) =

- Municipality
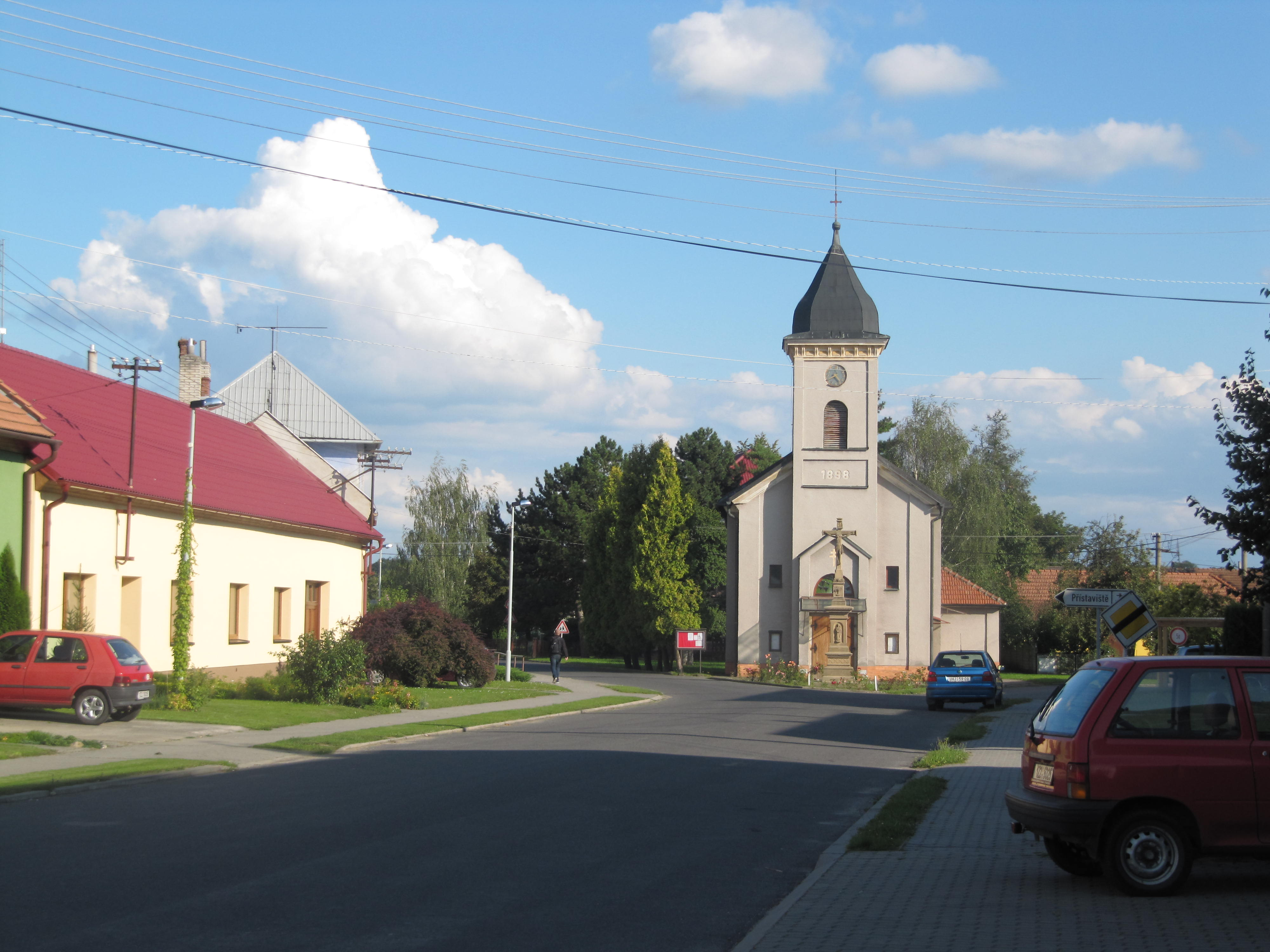
- Church of Saints Cyril and Methodius

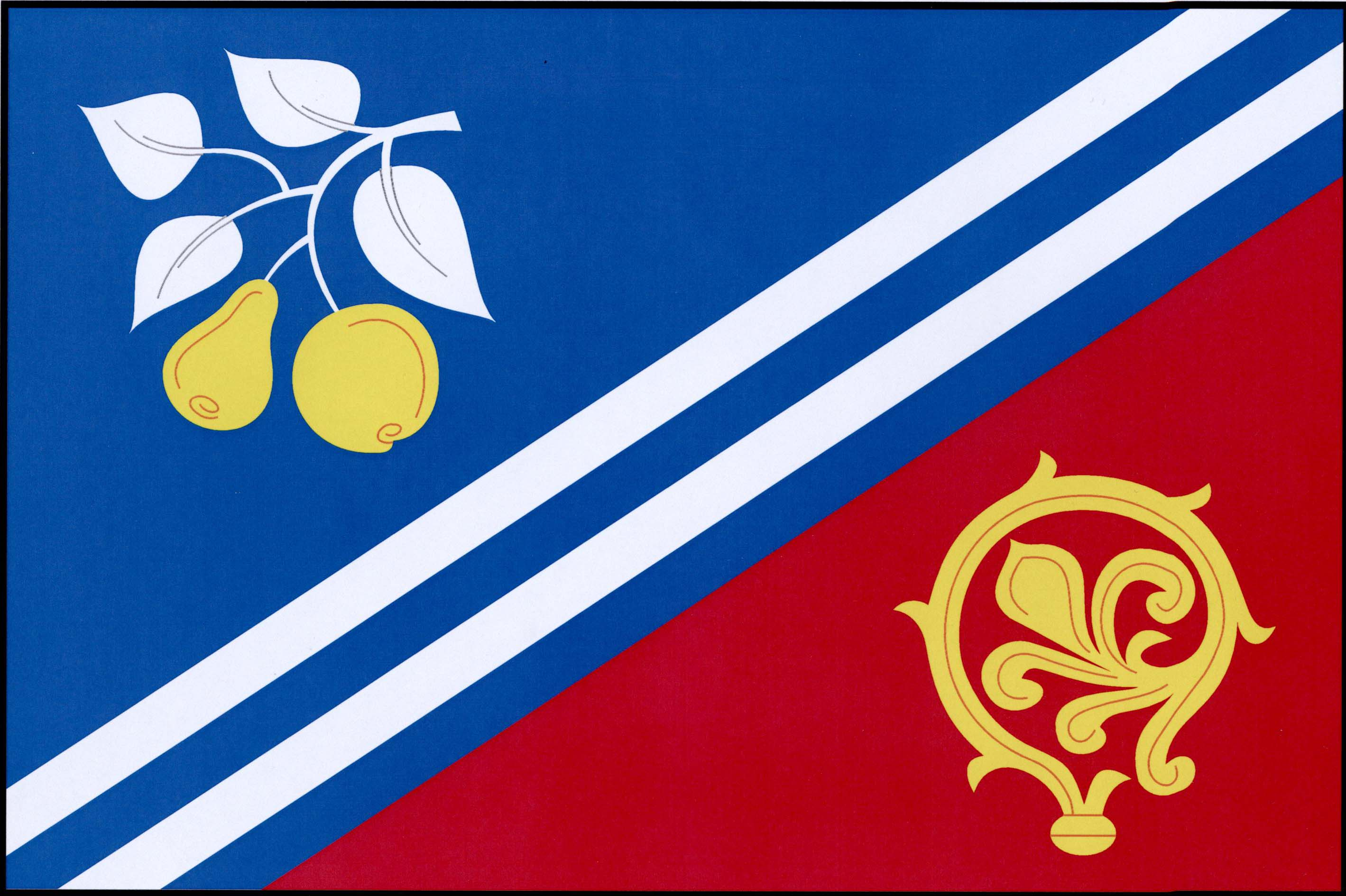
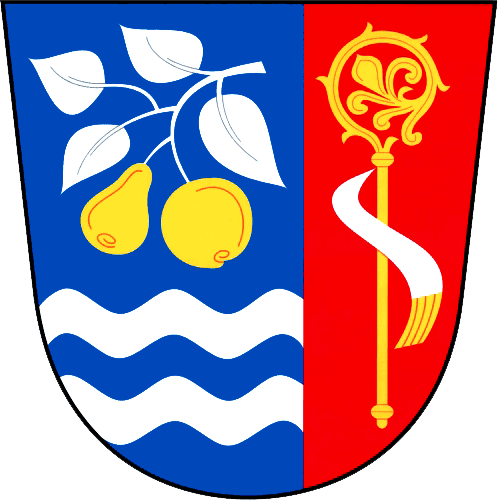
- Flag Coat of arms

- Location in the Czech Republic
- Coordinates: 49°7′18″N 17°28′51″E
- Country: Czech Republic
- Region: Zlín
- District: Uherské Hradiště
- First mentioned: 1220

Area
  - Total: 6.61 km^{2} (2.55 sq mi)
- Elevation: 183 m (600 ft)

Population (2026-01-01)
  - Total: 1,861
  - Density: 282/km^{2} (729/sq mi)
- Time zone: UTC+1 (CET)
  - Summer (DST): UTC+2 (CEST)
- Postal code: 687 03
- Website: www.babice.eu

Babice is a municipality and village in Uherské Hradiště District in the Zlín Region of the Czech Republic. It has about 1,900 inhabitants.

Babice lies approximately 7 kilometres (4 mi) north of Uherské Hradiště, 19 km (12 mi) south-west of Zlín, and 246 km (153 mi) south-east of Prague.

== Demographics ==
Historical population
Year	Pop.	±%
1869	878	—
1880	1,078	+22.8%
1890	1,122	+4.1%
1900	1,187	+5.8%
1910	1,313	+10.6%
1921	1,345	+2.4%
1930	1,310	−2.6%
1950	1,440	+9.9%
1961	1,622	+12.6%
1970	1,643	+1.3%
1980	1,615	−1.7%
1991	1,627	+0.7%
2001	1,745	+7.3%
2011	1,777	+1.8%
2021	1,720	−3.2%
Source: Censuses
