= Pravčice =

- Municipality
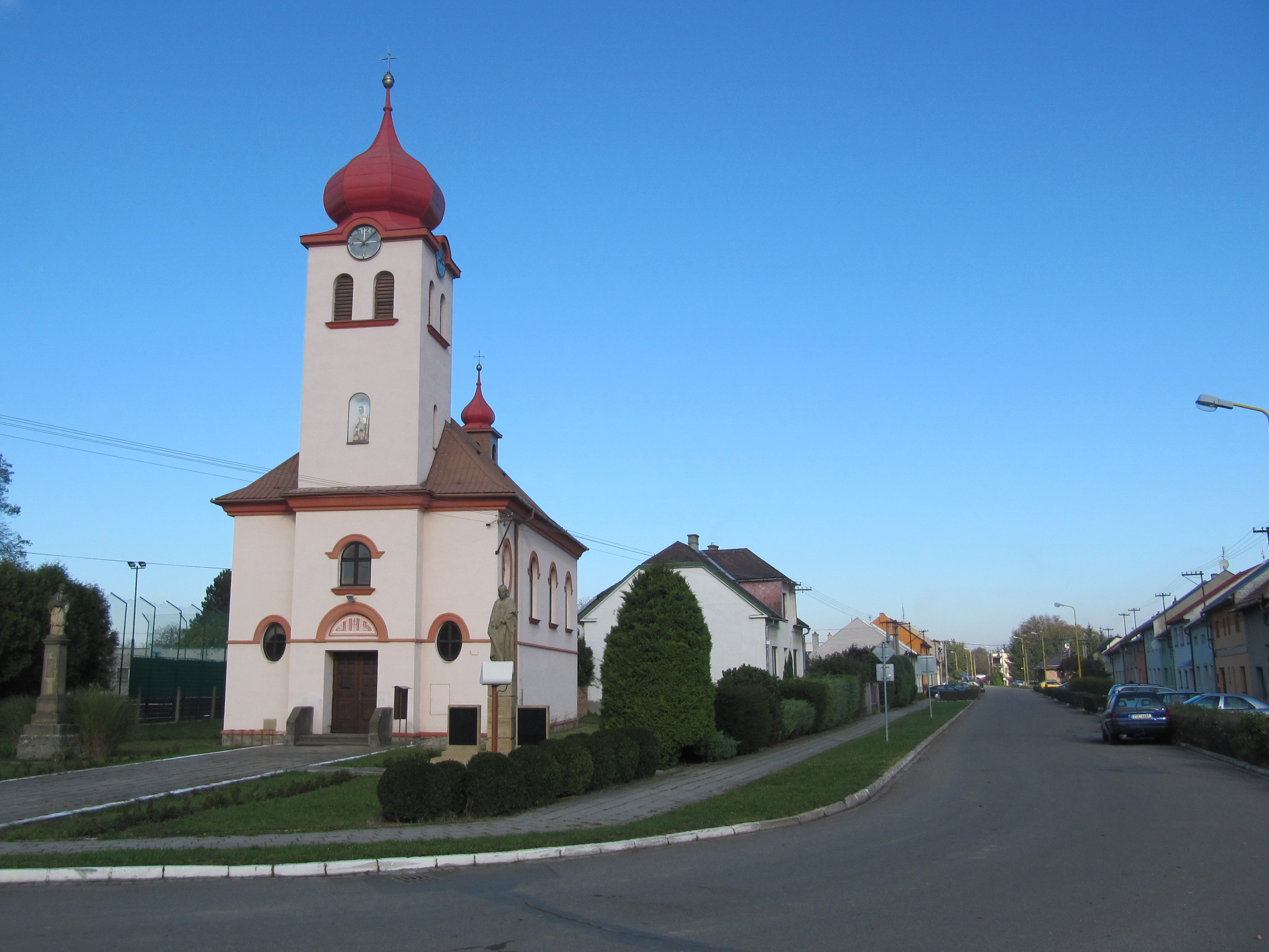
- Church of Saint Florian

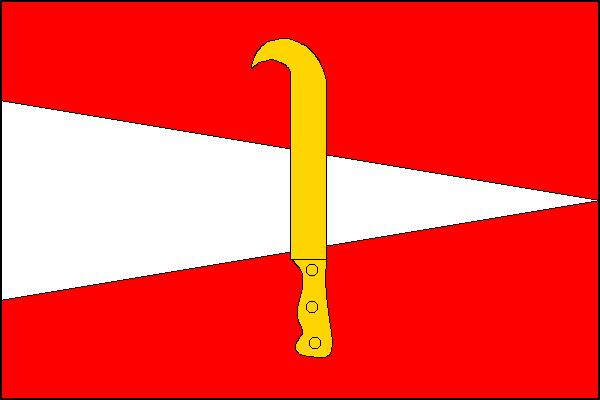
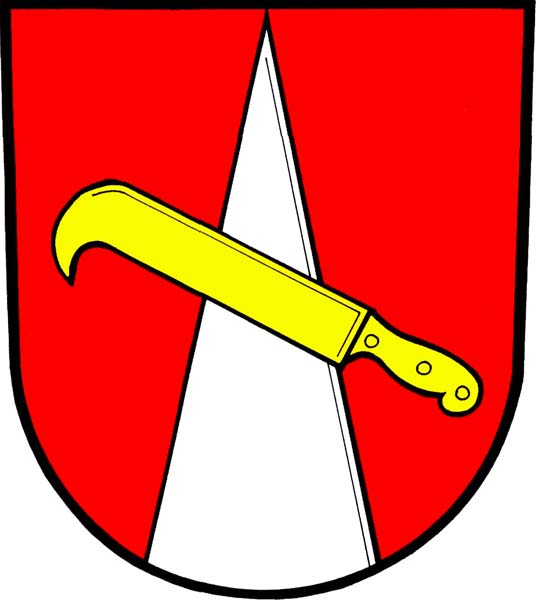
- Flag Coat of arms

- Location in the Czech Republic
- Coordinates: 49°19′28″N 17°29′44″E
- Country: Czech Republic
- Region: Zlín
- District: Kroměříž
- First mentioned: 1261

Area
  - Total: 6.99 km^{2} (2.70 sq mi)
- Elevation: 193 m (633 ft)

Population (2026-01-01)
  - Total: 713
  - Density: 102/km^{2} (264/sq mi)
- Time zone: UTC+1 (CET)
  - Summer (DST): UTC+2 (CEST)
- Postal code: 768 24
- Website: www.pravcice.cz

Pravčice is a municipality and village in Kroměříž District in the Zlín Region of the Czech Republic. It has about 700 inhabitants.

Pravčice lies approximately 8 kilometres (5 mi) east of Kroměříž, 17 km (11 mi) north-west of Zlín, and 237 km (147 mi) east of Prague.

== Demographics ==
Historical population
| Year | Pop. | ±% |
|---|---|---|
| 1869 | 607 | — |
| 1880 | 716 | +18.0% |
| 1890 | 814 | +13.7% |
| 1900 | 837 | +2.8% |
| 1910 | 849 | +1.4% |
| 1921 | 916 | +7.9% |
| 1930 | 858 | −6.3% |
| 1950 | 775 | −9.7% |
| 1961 | 778 | +0.4% |
| 1970 | 774 | −0.5% |
| 1980 | 742 | −4.1% |
| 1991 | 726 | −2.2% |
| 2001 | 726 | +0.0% |
| 2011 | 701 | −3.4% |
| 2021 | 676 | −3.6% |
Source: Censuses
