= Moravský Písek =

- Municipality
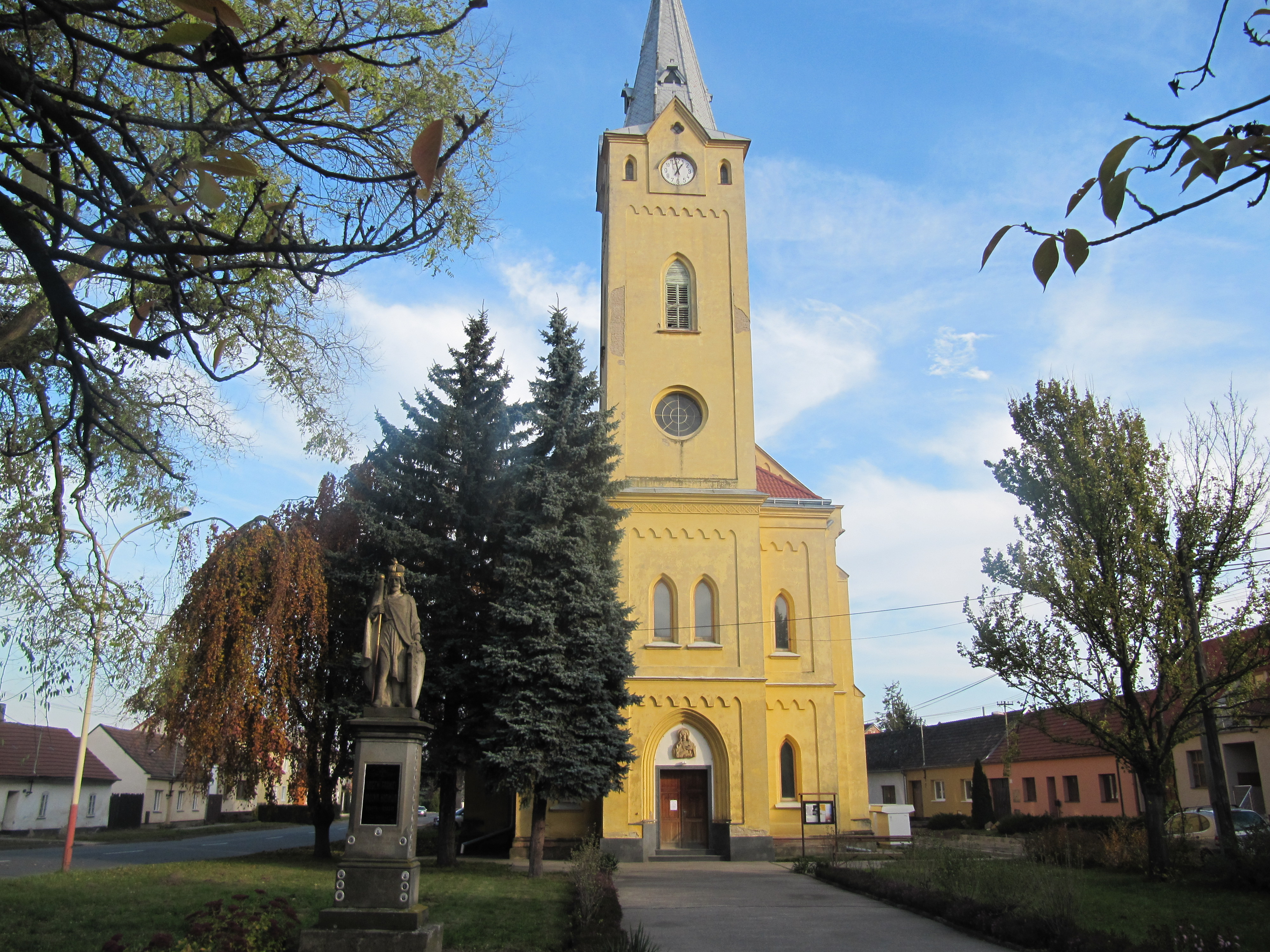
- Church of Saint Anne

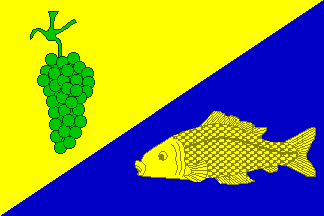
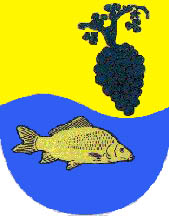
- Flag Coat of arms

- Location in the Czech Republic
- Coordinates: 48°59′25″N 17°19′58″E
- Country: Czech Republic
- Region: South Moravian
- District: Hodonín
- First mentioned: 1300

Area
  - Total: 14.89 km^{2} (5.75 sq mi)
- Elevation: 177 m (581 ft)

Population (2026-01-01)
  - Total: 2,037
  - Density: 136.8/km^{2} (354.3/sq mi)
- Time zone: UTC+1 (CET)
  - Summer (DST): UTC+2 (CEST)
- Postal code: 696 85
- Website: www.moravskypisek.cz

Moravský Písek is a municipality and village in Hodonín District in the South Moravian Region of the Czech Republic. It has about 2,000 inhabitants.

== Geography ==
Moravský Písek is located about 21 kilometres (13 mi) northeast of Hodonín and 56 km (35 mi) southeast of Brno. It lies mostly in a flat landscape in the Lower Morava Valley. A small part of the municipal territory in the north extends into the Kyjov Hills and includes the highest point of Moravský Písek at 265 m (869 ft) above sea level.

== History ==
The first written mention of Moravský Písek is from 1300.

== Demographics ==
Historical population

Year	Pop.	±%
1869	1,188	—
1880	1,422	+19.7%
1890	1,490	+4.8%
1900	1,759	+18.1%
1910	1,924	+9.4%

Year	Pop.	±%
1921	2,061	+7.1%
1930	2,059	−0.1%
1950	2,132	+3.5%
1961	2,374	+11.4%
1970	2,274	−4.2%

Year	Pop.	±%
1980	2,238	−1.6%
1991	2,143	−4.2%
2001	2,148	+0.2%
2011	2,090	−2.7%
2021	1,953	−6.6%

Source: Censuses

== Transport ==
The I/54 road (the section from Kyjov to the Czech–Slovak border in Strání) runs through the municipality.

Moravský Písek is located on the railway line Brno–Olomouc.

== Sights ==
The only protected cultural monuments in the municipality are a Baroque stone cross dating from 1762 and a Baroque statue of St. John of Nepomuk from 1746.

The main landmark of Moravský Písek is the Church of Saint Anne. It was built in 1909–1910.
