= Hajany (Brno-Country District) =

- Municipality
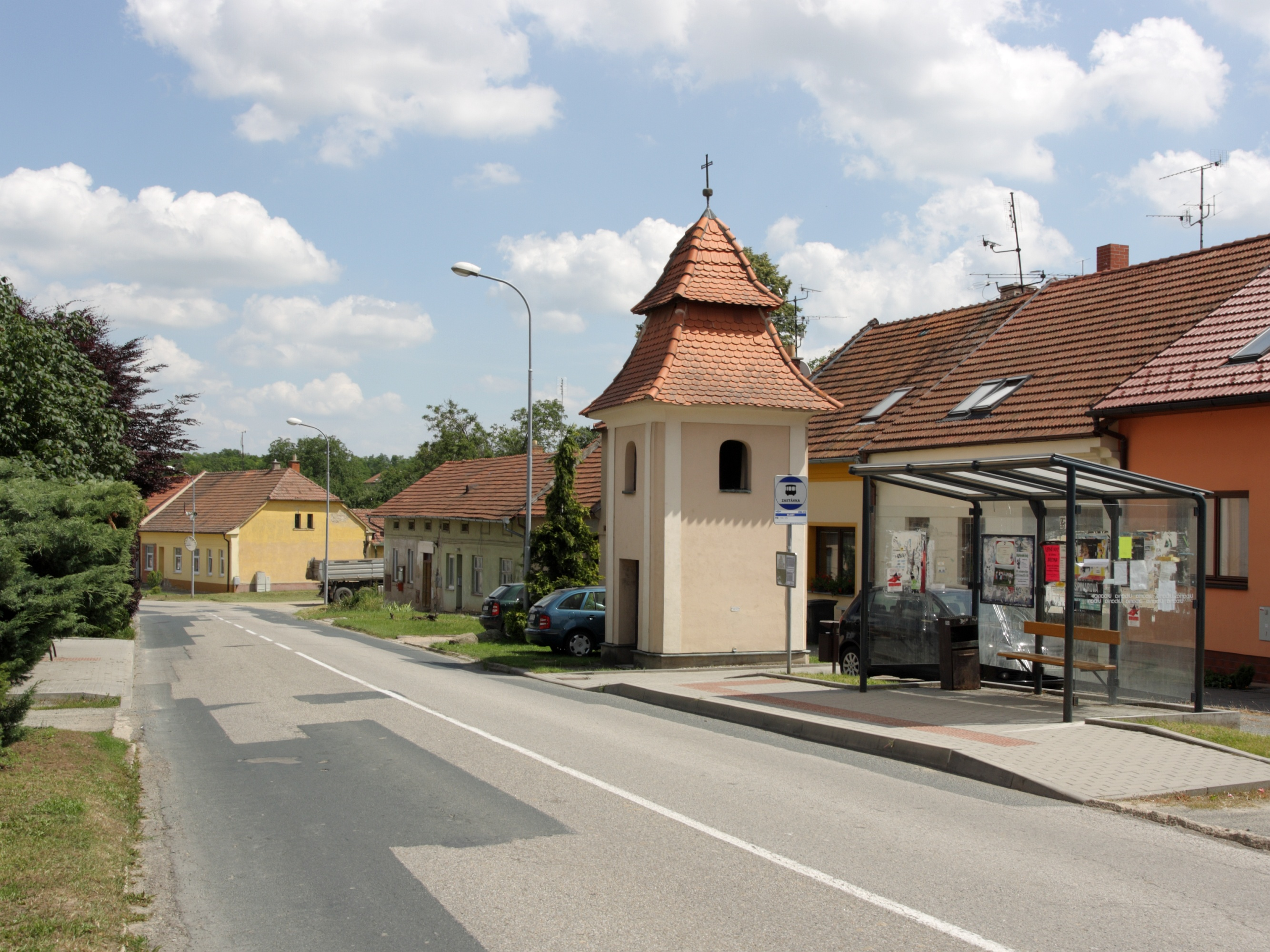
- Main street

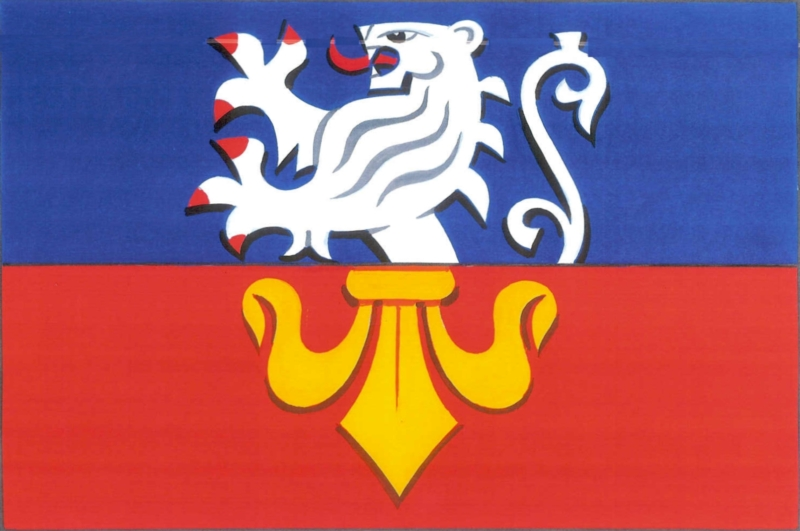
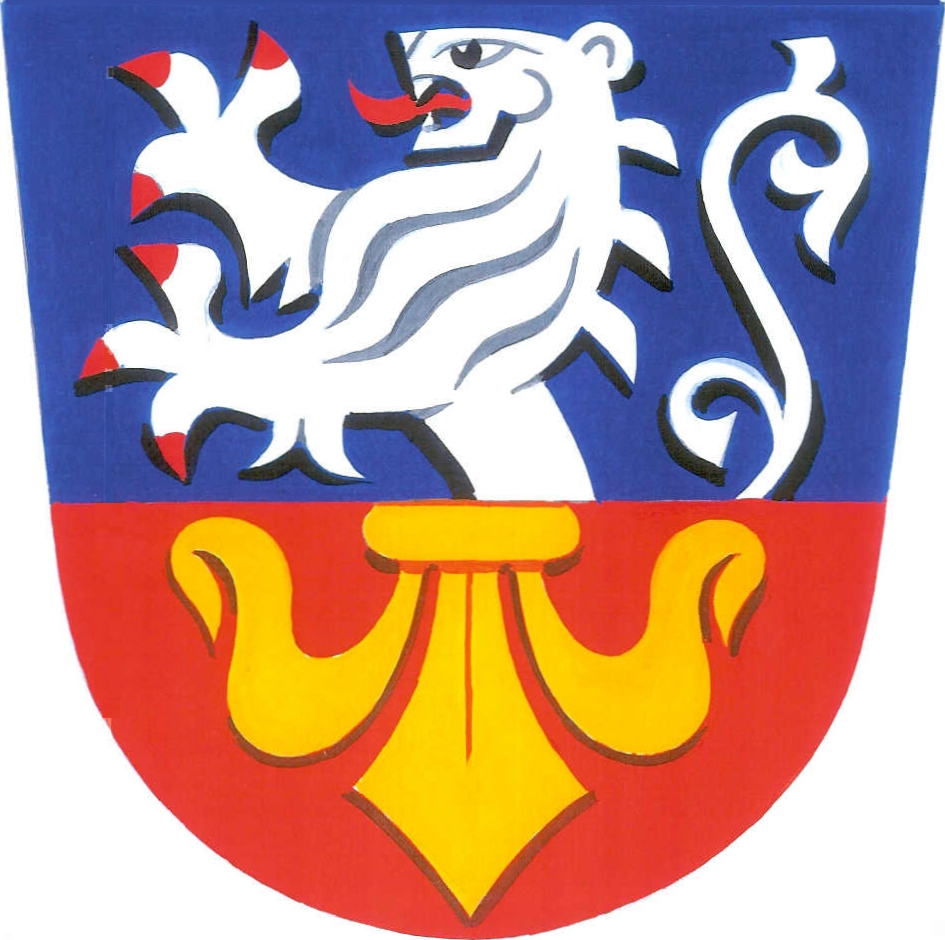
- Flag Coat of arms

- Location in the Czech Republic
- Coordinates: 49°6′39″N 16°33′18″E
- Country: Czech Republic
- Region: South Moravian
- District: Brno-Country
- First mentioned: 1323

Area
  - Total: 2.36 km^{2} (0.91 sq mi)
- Elevation: 252 m (827 ft)

Population (2026-01-01)
  - Total: 715
  - Density: 303/km^{2} (785/sq mi)
- Time zone: UTC+1 (CET)
  - Summer (DST): UTC+2 (CEST)
- Postal code: 664 43
- Website: www.hajany.cz

Hajany is a municipality and village in Brno-Country District in the South Moravian Region of the Czech Republic. It has about 700 inhabitants.

Hajany lies approximately 12 kilometres (7 mi) south-west of Brno and 189 km (117 mi) south-east of Prague.

== Demographics ==
Historical population
Year	Pop.	±%
1869	307	—
1880	292	−4.9%
1890	288	−1.4%
1900	247	−14.2%
1910	316	+27.9%
1921	335	+6.0%
1930	320	−4.5%
1950	280	−12.5%
1961	342	+22.1%
1970	353	+3.2%
1980	338	−4.2%
1991	349	+3.3%
2001	351	+0.6%
2011	341	−2.8%
2021	690	+102.3%
Source: Censuses
