= D49 motorway =

Czech motorway

D49 Motorway
- Dálnice D49

Route information
- Length: 17.4 km (10.8 mi) Planned: 35 km (22 mi)

Major junctions
- From: D1 / D55 in Hulín
- To: I/49 in Vizovice

Location
- Country: Czech Republic
- Regions: Zlín
- Major cities: Zlín

Highway system
- Highways in the Czech Republic
← D48	→ D52

D49 motorway (Czech: Dálnice D49) is a motorway under construction in the Czech Republic. When completed, it will connect D1 highway to the Slovakia's D1 highway via the R6 expressway. It is supposed to replace the planned route of the D1 highway to Slovakia, which original direction to Púchov (Slovakia) was diverted and now leads to Ostrava.

== History ==
Construction began in 2008, but was suspended in 2010 at first due to a lack of funding, but ultimately due to objections and lawsuits from environmental activists. The section form Hulín to Fryšták opened in 06/2026; other sections would follow later.

Construction of the first section resumed at the end of 2021. In 2024, a 9.8 km long section between Hulín and Holešov was opened.

=== Future plans ===
Further sections, between Fryšták and Vizovice (namely 4902 and 4903) are planned for 2032, 2033, 2034 and 2036. An additional 24.0 kilometres (14.9 mi) of motorway will be built.

The planned section of the D49 motorway between Vizovice and the state border, which was previously prepared as a three-lane directionally undivided road, was reclassified as an I/49 road in autumn 2023. In the future, that section will be a modernisation of the existing road. Construction is planned after 2030.

== Route description ==
Country	Region	Location	km	mi	Exit	Name	Destinations	Notes
Czech Republic	Zlin Region	Zlin Region	0	0.0	—	Hulín	D1 D55	Kilometrage starting point
Czech Republic	Zlin Region	Zlin Region	4	2.5	—	Třebětice		
Czech Republic	Zlin Region	Zlin Region	9	5.6	—	Holešov		Temporary end of motorway (other sections in construction or preparation)
Czech Republic	Zlin Region	Zlin Region	18	11	—	Fryšták		In construction
1.000 mi = 1.609 km; 1.000 km = 0.621 mi: Unopened
