= European route E461 =

Road in trans-European E-road network

E461

Route information
- Length: 202 km (126 mi)

Major junctions
- From: Svitavy (Czech Republic)
- Brno
- To: Vienna (Austria)

Location
- Countries: Czech Republic; Austria

Highway system
- International E-road network; A Class; B Class

E 461 is a European B class road in Czech Republic and Austria, connecting the cities Svitavy, Brno, and Vienna.

== Route ==
- Czech Republic
  - Svitavy
  - E50, E65, E462 Brno
- Austria
  - E49, E58, E59, E60 Vienna
